= Orwell Bight =

Bay in the South Orkney Islands

Orwell Bight (60°43′S 45°23′W) is a body of water lying south of the eastern half of Coronation Island, bounded on the west by Signy Island and on the east by the Robertson Islands, in the South Orkney Islands. The general nature of this bight was first delineated by Petter Sorlle, Norwegian whaling captain who mapped this area in 1912–13. It was surveyed by DI personnel in 1933 and by the Falkland Islands Dependencies Survey (FIDS) in 1948–49. Named by the United Kingdom Antarctic Place-Names Committee (UK-APC) for the Norwegian transport Orwell, the second ship of that name belonging to the Tonsberg Hvalfangeri, which anchored in Borge Bay, Signy Island, on the west side of this bight in the seasons 1925–26 to 1929–30.
