= Gerd Island =

Island in the South Orkney Islands

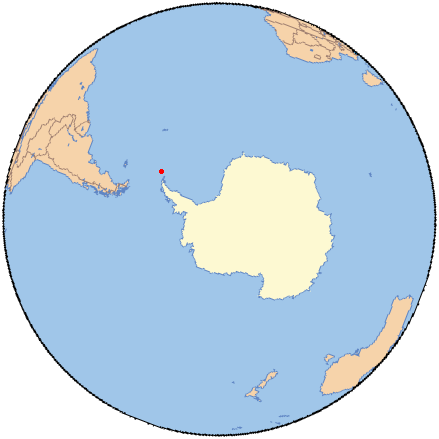
Gerd Island.

Gerd Island (60°40′S 45°44′W) is an island 1 nautical mile (2 km) west-southwest of Stene Point at the east side of the entrance to Norway Bight, off the south coast of Coronation Island in the South Orkney Islands. It was charted and named by Norwegian whaling captain Petter Sorlle, who made a running survey of the South Orkney Islands in 1912–13.

== See also ==
- List of antarctic and sub-antarctic islands
