= List of glaciers of the South Orkney Islands =

Following is a list of glaciers of the South Orkney Islands in Antarctica. This list may not reflect recently named glaciers in the South Orkney Islands.

- Laws Glacier
- McLeod Glacier (South Orkney Islands)
- Orwell Glacier
- Roald Glacier
- Sunshine Glacier
