= Meier Point =

Headland in the South Orkney Islands

Coordinates: 60°38′S 45°54′W

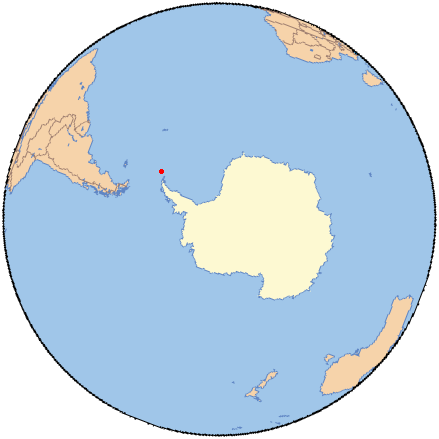
South Orkney Islands.

Meier Point is a point forming the west side of the entrance to Norway Bight on the south side of Coronation Island, in the South Orkney Islands off Antarctica. It was named on a chart by Captain Petter Sørlle, a Norwegian whaler who made a running survey of the South Orkney Islands in 1912–13. The Gosling Islands lie close to this point.
