= Richardson Cove =

West-facing cove on the southwest side of Moe Island, South Orkney Islands

Richardson Cove (60°44′15″S 45°41′45″W) is a west-facing cove on the southwest side of Moe Island in the South Orkney Islands. The cove, entered between Conroy Point and Corral Point, falls within Antarctic Specially Protected Area No. 109. It was named by the UK Antarctic Place-names Committee in 2006 after Michael George Richardson, Head of Polar Regions Unit, Foreign and Commonwealth Office from 1992 to 2006; British Antarctic Survey (BAS) Biologist, 1970–75; Base Commander, Signy Island (1972–73).
