= Cragsman Peaks =

The Cragsman Peaks (60°38′S 45°40′W) are peaks on the west side of Marshall Bay, extending from Cape Vik northwest to Coldblow Col on the south coast of Coronation Island, in the South Orkney Islands. They were surveyed by the Falkland Islands Dependencies Survey in 1956–58 and so named by the UK Antarctic Place-Names Committee because the peaks provide a "climbers' paradise."
