= Yordanov Island =

One of the South Orkney Islands in the Southern Ocean

- Map of the South Orkney Islands

- Location within Antarctica

Geography
- Location: Antarctica
- Coordinates: 60°32′12.5″S 45°29′47″W
- Archipelago: South Orkney Islands
- Area: 11 ha (27 acres)
- Length: 600 m (2000 ft)
- Width: 300 m (1000 ft)

Administration
- Administered under the Antarctic Treaty System

Demographics
- Population: uninhabited

Yordanov Island (Bulgarian: Йорданов остров, romanized: Yordanov ostrov, IPA: [jordɐˈnɔf ˈɔstrof]) is the 600 m long in west–east direction and 300 m wide rocky island with surface area of 11 hectares (27 acres) whose north extremity Foul Point forms the east entrance to Ommanney Bay on the north coast of Coronation Island in the South Orkney Islands, Antarctica. It is separated from the main island by a passage narrowing to just 30 m at points. The island is named after Captain Yordan Yordanov (1932-2012), commander of the ocean fishing trawler Sagita of the Bulgarian company Ocean Fisheries – Burgas during its fishing trip to Antarctic waters off South Georgia from December 1979 to June 1980. A designated onboard team of marine biologists undertook fisheries research in the process. The Bulgarian fishermen, along with those of the Soviet Union, Poland and East Germany are the pioneers of modern Antarctic fishing industry.

== Location ==
Yordanov Island is located at 60°32′12.5″S 45°29′47″W, which is 3.95 km east-northeast of Prong Point, 800 m east of Brusa Islet and 7.7 km northwest of Findlay Point. British mapping in 1963.

== Maps ==
- British Antarctic Territory: South Orkney Islands. Scale 1:100000 topographic map. DOS Series 510. Surrey, England: Directorate of Overseas Surveys, 1963
- Antarctic Digital Database (ADD). Scale 1:250000 topographic map of Antarctica. Scientific Committee on Antarctic Research (SCAR). Since 1993, regularly upgraded and updated
