= Karlsen Rock =

Submerged rock near the South Orkney Islands, Antarctica

Karlsen Rock (60°21′S 46°0′W) is a submerged rock lying 10 nautical miles (19 km) north-northwest of Penguin Point, the northwesternmost point of Coronation Island in the South Orkney Islands. It was charted and named on a map by Petter Sørlle, a Norwegian whaler who made a running survey of the South Orkney Islands in 1912–13.
