= The Divide (South Orkney Islands) =

Channel in Antarctica

The Divide (60°44′S 45°10′W) is a narrow channel between Matthews Island and the southeast extremity of Coronation Island, in the South Orkney Islands. Charted as an isthmus in 1912-13 by Norwegian whaling captain Petter Sorlle; recharted as an isthmus and named descriptively by DI in 1933. The feature was surveyed by Falkland Islands Dependencies Survey (FIDS) in 1957 and found to be a channel.
