= Worswick Hill =

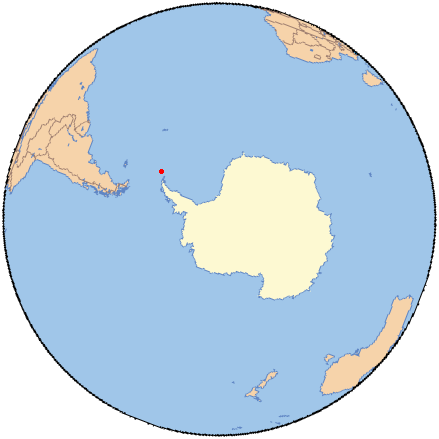
South Orkney Islands.

Worswick Hill (60°34′S 45°44′W) is a rounded summit, 36 kilometres (22 mi), at the west end of Brisbane Heights on Coronation Island, in the South Orkney Islands. The peak appears on some early charts of the South Orkney Islands but is not accurately located. It was roughly surveyed by DI personnel in 1933 and resurveyed by the Falkland Islands Dependencies Survey (FIDS) in 1948–49. Named by the United Kingdom Antarctic Place-Names Committee (UK-APC) for Robert F. Worswick of the FIDS, meteorologist at Signy Island in 1950 and 1951, who reached this hill during a sledge journey in 1950.
