= Gosling Islands =

Islands of Antarctica

- Location within Antarctica

Geography
- Location: Antarctica
- Coordinates: 60°39′S 45°55′W

Administration
- Administered under the Antarctic Treaty System

Demographics
- Population: Uninhabited

The Gosling Islands are a scattered group of islands and rocks lying close south and west of Meier Point, off the south coast of Coronation Island in the South Orkney Islands of Antarctica. They were first charted and named "Gestlingen" by Petter Sorlle in 1912–13. This was corrected to "Gjeslingene" (the goslings) on a later chart by Sorlle. The approved name is an anglicized form recommended by the UK Antarctic Place-Names Committee.

== Important Bird Area ==
The islands, with a nearby ice-free headland on the south-western coast of Coronation Island, has been identified as an Important Bird Area (IBA) by BirdLife International because it supports a large breeding colony of about 10,000 pairs of chinstrap penguins, as well as over 8000 pairs of Adélie penguins.

== See also ==
- List of Antarctic and subantarctic islands
