= Beaufoy Ridge =

Beaufoy Ridge (60°38′S 45°33′W) is a conspicuous black ridge, rising to 650 metres (2,130 ft) at its northwest end, standing at the west side of Sunshine Glacier and close north of Iceberg Bay on the south coast of Coronation Island, in the South Orkney Islands. It was named by the Falkland Islands Dependencies Survey, following their survey in 1948–49, after the cutter Beaufoy which, on 12 December 1821, under Michael McLeod, sailed to a position at least 60 nautical miles (110 km) west of the South Orkney Islands, where a chart annotation indicates that land was sighted, possibly Coronation Island.
