= Usnea Ridge =

Usnea Ridge (60°42′S 45°38′W) is a ridge at an elevation of 100–160 m, extending north-northwest from Jane Peak to Spindrift Col in central Signy Island, South Orkney Islands. This ridge was an ecological study site for British Antarctic Survey (BAS) biologists. Named by the United Kingdom Antarctic Place-Names Committee (UK-APC) in 1991 after lichens of the genus Usnea, which form a main element of the plant life on the ridge.
