= Coffer Island =

Island in the South Orkneys, Antarctic Ocean

Coffer Island (60°45′S 45°8′W) is a small island lying in the entrance to the bay on the east side of Matthews Island in the Robertson Islands group of the South Orkney Islands. The names "Koffer" and "Kotter" are used for this feature on two manuscript charts based on surveys by Captain Petter Sorlle during 1912–15. The recommended spelling, the anglicized form of the first of the two names, was used by Discovery Investigations personnel on the Discovery II who charted these islands in 1933.

== See also ==
- List of antarctic and sub-antarctic islands
