= Mansfield Point =

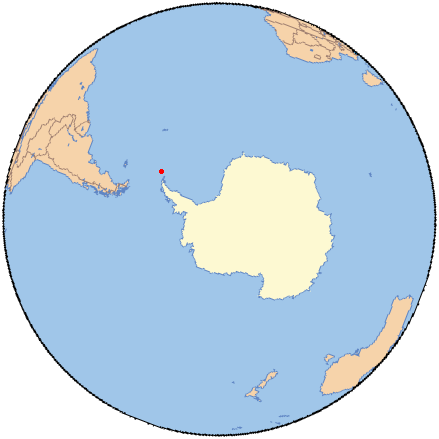
South Orkney Islands.

Mansfield Point (60°39′S 45°44′W) is a point marking the east side of the entrance to Norway Bight on the south coast of Coronation Island, in the South Orkney Islands, Antarctica. It was surveyed by Discovery Investigations personnel in 1933 and by the Falkland Islands Dependencies Survey (FIDS) in 1948–49. The feature was named by the UK Antarctic Place-Names Committee for Arthur W. Mansfield of the FIDS, a meteorologist at Grytviken, South Georgia, in 1951, and leader, meteorologist and biologist at Signy Island in 1952.
