= Maling Peak =

Mountain in the South Orkney Islands

Maling Peak (60°39′S 45°40′W) is a mountain 430 metres (1,400 ft) high and is the southernmost of two conspicuous peaks 0.5 nautical miles (1 km) northwest of Cape Vik on the south coast of Coronation Island in the South Orkney Islands, Antarctica. It was roughly surveyed in 1933 by Discovery Investigations personnel and was named by the UK Antarctic Place-Names Committee for Derek H. Maling, a Falkland Islands Dependencies Survey meteorologist at Signy Island in 1948 and 1949, who made a survey triangulation of Signy Island and the south coast of Coronation Island.
