= Reid Island =

Island in the South Orkney Islands

Location of Reid Island

Reid Island () is an island of the South Atlantic Ocean at the east side of the entrance to Iceberg Bay, along the south coast of Coronation Island in the South Orkney Islands. The name "Reidholmen" appears in this location for a small group of islands on a chart drawn by Captain Petter Sorlle in 1912–13. Survey by the Falkland Islands Dependencies Survey (FIDS) in 1948–49 determined that only a single island exists.

== See also ==
- List of antarctic and sub-antarctic islands

60°41′S 45°30′W
