= Strombus Ridge =

Ridge in the South Orkney Islands

Coordinates: 60°42′S 45°39′W

Strombus Ridge is a ridge curving eastward from Thulla Point toward Jane Col on Signy Island, South Orkney Islands. The feature is 0.3 nautical miles (0.6 km) south of Jensen Ridge. Named by the United Kingdom Antarctic Place-Names Committee (UK-APC) after the whaling ship Strombus (Captain Gullik Jensen), from Tonsberg, Norway, used on the last whaling expedition to Signy Island, 1935–36.
