= Garnet Hill =

Garnet Hill (60°44′S 45°38′W) is a rocky hill, 230 metres (750 ft) high, rising above the east side of McLeod Glacier in the south part of Signy Island, in the South Orkney Islands. It forms the south end of a line of rock and ice cliffs which separate McLeod Glacier from Orwell Glacier. It was so named by the Falkland Islands Dependencies Survey, following their survey of 1947, because of the abundance of garnets found there.
