= Devils Peak (Antarctica) =

Rocky peak in the South Orkney Islands

Devils Peak (60°39′S 45°27′W) is a conspicuous rocky peak, 735 m, between Sunshine Glacier and Devils Corrie on the south side of Coronation Island, in the South Orkney Islands. Surveyed in 1948-49 by the Falkland Islands Dependencies Survey (FIDS), who so named it because of its proximity to Devils Corrie.
