= Laws Glacier =

Glacier in Antarctica

- Location within South Orkney Islands
- Type: confluent glacier
- Location: South Orkney Islands
- Coordinates: 60°38′S 45°38′W
- Thickness: unknown
- Terminus: Marshall Bay
- Status: unknown

Laws Glacier (60°38′S 45°38′W) is a confluent glacier system which flows into Marshall Bay on the south coast of Coronation Island, in the South Orkney Islands off Antarctica. It was surveyed in 1948–49 by the Falkland Islands Dependencies Survey (FIDS), and was named by the UK Antarctic Place-Names Committee for Richard M. Laws of the FIDS, leader and biologist at Signy Research Station in 1948 and 1949, and at South Georgia in 1951.

== See also ==
- List of glaciers in the Antarctic
- Glaciology
