= Devils Corrie =

Devils Corrie (60°39′S 45°25′W) is a large and very spectacular cirque, or corrie, midway between Olivine Point and Amphibolite Point on the south coast of Coronation Island in the South Orkney Islands. It was named by the Falkland Islands Dependencies Survey following their survey of 1948–49. Devils Peak is named after the corrie.
