= Shingle Cove =

Bay of Antarctica

Coordinates: 60°39′17″S 45°33′59″W

Location in Antarctica

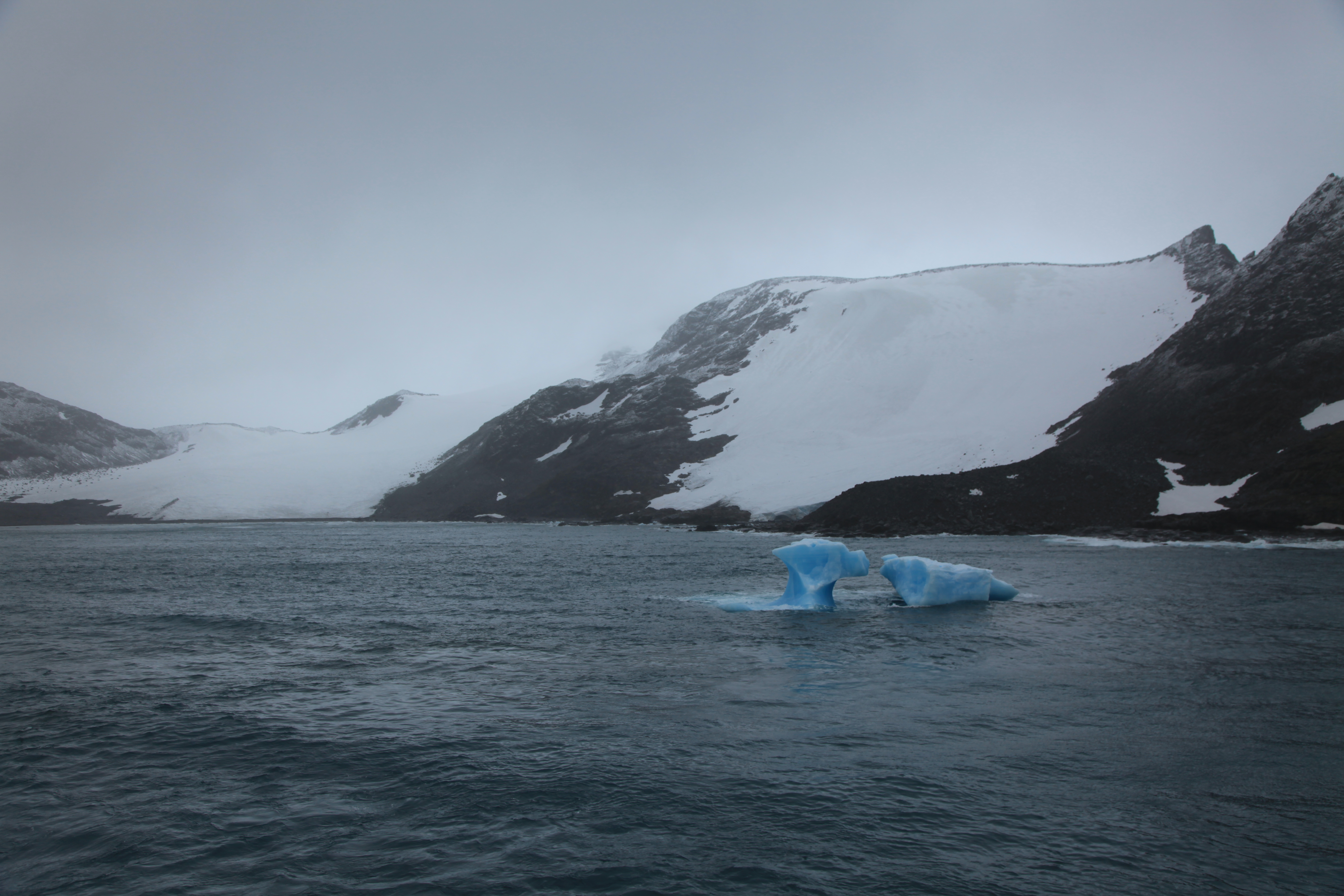
Shingle Cove

Shingle Cove is a small, sheltered cove in the north-west corner of Iceberg Bay, several kilometres east of Cape Hansen, on the south coast of Coronation Island, in the South Orkney Islands of Antarctica. The nearest research station is the British Signy, about 1.5 km south-west of Cape Hansen.

== Discovery and naming ==
The cove was first surveyed by DI personnel in 1933. The name, applied by the Falkland Islands Dependencies Survey (FIDS) following their survey of 1948–49, arose from the fine shingle on the landing beach on the south shore of the cove.

== Important Bird Area ==
A 34 ha site comprising the ice-free area south-west and adjacent to the cove has been designated an Important Bird Area (IBA) by BirdLife International because it supports a colony of about 13,000 Adélie penguins, with another 3,000 pairs within the cove. Other birds recorded as breeding at the site include Cape and snow petrels, skuas and snowy sheathbills.
