= Tickell Head =

Tickell Head (60°32′S 45°48′W) is a headland forming the east side of Bridger Bay on the north coast of Coronation Island, in the South Orkney Islands. First seen in December 1821 in the course of the joint cruise by Captain Nathaniel Palmer, American sealer, and Captain George Powell, British sealer. Surveyed by the Falkland Islands Dependencies Survey (FIDS) in 1956-58 and named by the United Kingdom Antarctic Place-Names Committee (UK-APC) in 1959 for William L.N. Tickell, FIDS meteorologist at Signy Island in 1955 and leader at that station in 1956.
