= Normanna Strait =

Strait in the Southern Ocean

Coordinates: 60°40′S 45°38′W

Normanna Strait is a strait 1 nautical mile (1.9 km) wide between Signy Island and Coronation Island in the South Orkney Islands. Discovered by Matthew Brisbane, who roughly charted the south coast of Coronation Island under the direction of James Weddell in 1823. The name appears on a chart based upon a survey of these islands by Captain Petter Sorlle in 1912–13, and is presumably derived from the Normanna Whaling Co. of Sandefjord, Norway, operators of the floating factory ship Normanna.
