= Pomona Plateau =

Ice-covered plateau in the South Orkney Islands

Pomona Plateau (60°35′S 45°55′W) is an ice-covered plateau, over 300 metres (980 ft) elevation, extending between Sandefjord Peaks and Deacon Hill in the western part of Coronation Island, in the South Orkney Islands. Named by the United Kingdom Antarctic Place-Names Committee (UK-APC) following a survey by the Falkland Islands Dependencies Survey (FIDS) in 1948–50. This naming revives in an altered form a name given by James Weddell in 1822. Being unaware of the prior discovery of Coronation Island by Captain Nathaniel Palmer and Captain George Powell, and its naming at that time, Weddell renamed the island "Pomona" or "Mainland" after the island in the northern Orkney Islands. That name was published by Weddell in 1825 but did not survive.
