= Cockscomb Buttress =

Mountain in Antarctica

Cockscomb Buttress (60°37′S 45°42′W) is a prominent, isolated rock buttress rising to 465 metres (1,530 ft), standing 1 nautical mile (2 km) northwest of Echo Mountain and overlooking the east side of Norway Bight on the south coast of Coronation Island, in the South Orkney Islands. The name, which is descriptive, was given by the Falkland Islands Dependencies Survey following their survey of 1950.
