= Cape Hansen =

Cape in the South Orkney Islands, Antarctica

Coordinates: 60°40′S 45°35′W

Cape Hansen is a cape which separates Marshall Bay and Iceberg Bay on the south coast of Coronation Island, in the South Orkney Islands, Antarctica. The name appears on a chart based upon a running survey of the islands in 1912–13 by Petter Sørlle, a Norwegian whaling captain.

== Important Bird Area ==
The site has been identified as an Important Bird Area (IBA) by BirdLife International because it supports a large breeding colony of about 13,000 pairs of chinstrap penguins, as well as a few pairs of brown skuas among the penguins.
