= Skilling Island =

Island in Antarctica

Coordinates: 60°47′S 45°09′W

Skilling Island is a small island immediately north of Atriceps Island, in the Robertson Islands group of the South Orkney Islands of Antarctica. Although roughly charted at a much earlier date, the island was first surveyed in 1933 by DI personnel. It was named by the United Kingdom Antarctic Place-Names Committee (UK-APC) for Charles J. Skilling (1931–52) of the Falkland Islands Dependencies Survey (FIDS), general assistant at Signy Island in 1949, and member of the sledge party which visited the Robertson Islands the same year. Skilling died aboard the John Biscoe on 17 April 1952.

== Important Bird Area ==
The island is part of the Robertson Islands North Important Bird Area (IBA), identified as such by BirdLife International because it supports substantial breeding colonies of chinstrap penguins.

== See also ==
- List of Antarctic and subantarctic islands
