= Deacon Hill (Antarctica) =

Hill in the South Orkney Islands

Deacon Hill (60°34′00″S 045°48′00″W) is a conspicuous ice-covered peak rising to 330 metres. It lies on the divide between Bridger Bay and Norway Bight in the western part of Coronation Island, in the South Orkney Islands.

The hill was first sighted in 1821 by Captain Nathaniel Palmer and Captain George Powell during their joint cruise, and it was roughly charted on Powell's map published in 1822. It was recharted in 1933 by Discovery Investigations personnel on the RRS Discovery II, who named it after George E.R. Deacon, a member of the hydrological staff of the Discovery Committee.
