= Thule Islands =

Island group in Antarctica

- Location within Antarctica

Geography
- Location: Southern Atlantic Ocean
- Coordinates: 60°42′S 45°37′W

Administration
- South Orkney Islands

Demographics
- Population: 0

The Thule Islands are a group of small islands and rocks lying 0.25 nautical miles (0.5 km) southwest of Balin Point in the northwestern part of Borge Bay, Signy Island, in the South Orkney Islands off Antarctica. The name "Thule Rocks" was used as early as 1916, and appears to refer at least in part to this group. The Thule, one of the first floating factories to flense whales at sea, belonged to the Thule Whaling Company of Oslo. It operated in the South Orkney Islands in 1912–13 and 1913–14 and anchored on the east side of Signy Island during January 1913. The altered form of the name was recommended by the UK Antarctic Place-names Committee following a survey by the Falkland Islands Dependencies Survey in 1947.
