= Tønsberg Cove =

Cove in the South Orkney Islands

Tønsberg Cove (60°32′S 45°55′W) is a cove 1 nautical mile (1.9 km) southeast of Penguin Point on the north coast of Coronation Island, in the South Orkney Islands. It was charted in 1912–13 by Petter Sørlle, a Norwegian whaling captain and named after the Tønsberg Hvalfangeri, of Tønsberg, Norway, a company which operated a permanent whaling base in the South Orkney Islands in the period 1920–30.
