= Bridger Bay =

Bridger Bay (60°33′S 45°51′W) is a semi-circular bay 2.5 nautical miles (5 km) wide, lying west of Tickell Head along the north coast of Coronation Island, in the South Orkney Islands. It was discovered in 1821 in the course of the joint cruise by Captain Nathaniel Palmer, an American sealer, and Captain George Powell, a British sealer. It was surveyed by the Falkland Islands Dependencies Survey in 1956–58 and named by the UK Antarctic Place-Names Committee for John F.D. Bridger, who participated in the survey of Coronation Island and Signy Island.
