= Cleft Point =

Headland on the east side of Norway Bight, Coronation Island, South Orkney Islands

Cleft Point (60°37′S 45°46′W) is a headland on the east side of Norway Bight on the south coast of Coronation Island, South Orkney Islands. The point marks the western extremity of an island which is separated from Coronation Island by a narrow channel, but it was mapped by Discovery Investigations in 1933 as a point on Coronation Island itself. The descriptive name alludes to the narrow separation from the main island and was given by the Falkland Islands Dependencies Survey following their survey of 1950.
