= Moss Braes =

West-facing slopes on Signy Island

The Moss Braes (60°41′S 45°37′W) are west-facing slopes (braes) situated west of Robin Peak on Signy Island, in the South Orkney Islands off Antarctica. They were named by the UK Antarctic Place-Names Committee in 1990 from the extensive moss banks on the dissected rocky slopes.
