= Penguin Point (Coronation Island) =

Penguin Point (60°31′00″S 45°56′00″W) is a point which forms the northwestern extremity of Coronation Island in the South Orkney Islands of Antarctica.

== Nearby formations ==
Several named rock formations are located offshore just west of Penguin Point. The Melsom Rocks are 7 nautical miles (13 km) offshore. 2 nautical miles (4 km) south are the Despair Rocks, 7.5 nautical miles (14 km) west-southwest of Penguin Point. 2 nautical miles (4 km) southwest of the Despair Rocks is Lay-brother Rock, which is 7 nautical miles (13 km) northwest of the west end of Coronation Island.

Penguin Point and its nearby rocks were primarily discovered in early December 1821 by Captain George Powell, a British sealer in the sloop Dove, and Captain Nathaniel Palmer, an American sealer in the sloop James Monroe. Penguin Point was named by Powell because of the number of penguins which were on this point. The Melsom Rocks were named for Captain H.G. Melsom, manager of the Thule Whaling Company, by Captain Petter Sorlle, who conducted a running survey of the South Orkney Islands in 1912–13. The exception is Lay-brother Rock, which was charted and named by Discovery Investigations personnel on the Discovery II in 1933.

== See also ==
- Karlsen Rock, submerged rock 10 nautical miles (19 km) north-northwest of Penguin Point
