= Wave Peak =

Mountain in the South Orkney Islands

Coordinates: 60°37′S 45°36′W

Wave Peak is a conspicuous peak, 960 metres (3,150 ft), which rises precipitously from the head of Laws Glacier in the central part of Coronation Island, in the South Orkney Islands. The feature has a prominent ridge running in a southwesterly direction. To the north and east it slopes gently to the level of Brisbane Heights. Surveyed in 1948–49 by the Falkland Islands Dependencies Survey (FIDS), and so named by them because of the resemblance of this peak to a wave about to break.
