= Stene Point =

Stene Point (60°39′S 45°42′W) is a point lying 1.5 nautical miles (2.8 km) of Cape Vik on the south coast of Coronation Island, in the South Orkney islands. Surveyed by DI personnel in 1933, and resurveyed by the Falkland Islands Dependencies Survey (FIDS) in 1948–49. Named by the United Kingdom Antarctic Place-Names Committee (UK-APC) for K.O. Stene, captain of the floating factory Normanna which operated in the South Orkney Islands in 1912–13.
