= Parpen Crags =

Rock face in Coronation Island, South Orkney Islands

Parpen Crags (60°35′S 45°49′W) is a precipitous, isolated rock face, near the head of Norway Bight on the south side of Coronation Island, in the South Orkney Islands. Named by the United Kingdom Antarctic Place-Names Committee (UK-APC) following survey by the Falkland Islands Dependencies Survey (FIDS) in 1948–50. Parpen is a term used in masonry to denote a stone extending through the thickness of a wall.
