= Fyr Channel =

Fyr Channel (60°44′S 45°41′W) is a channel 0.2 nautical miles (0.4 km) wide between the southwest end of Signy Island and Moe Island, in the South Orkney Islands. The name "Fyr Strait" appears on a manuscript chart drawn by Captain Petter Sorlle in 1912, and corrected by Hans Borge in 1913, but the generic term channel is approved because of the small size of this feature. The Corral Whaling Co. of Bergen, a subsidiary of Messrs. Christensen and Co., Corral, Chile, operated the steam whaler Fyr in the South Orkney Islands in 1912–13.
