= Moraine Valley =

Valley in Antarctica

Moraine Valley (60°43′S 45°37′W) is a valley filled with morainic debris, 0.75 nautical miles (1.4 km) long, which drains north into Elephant Flats on the east side of Signy Island, in the South Orkney Islands off Antarctica. In summer a stream, fed by the ice slopes at its south end, runs in this valley. It was named by the Falkland Islands Dependencies Survey following their survey of 1947.

Orwell Lake is a small lake in Moraine Valley, lying southeast of Orwell Glacier in the east part of Signy Island, South Orkney Islands. The lake has developed with the retreat of Orwell Glacier in recent years. Named by the United Kingdom Antarctic Place-Names Committee (UK-APC) in 1981 in association with the glacier.
