= Andreaea Plateau =

Plateau on Signy Island, South Orkney Islands

Andreaea Plateau (60°41′S 45°37′W) is a small plateau with an average elevation of 180 metres (590 ft), located southwest of Robin Peak, Signy Island, in the South Orkney Islands. The feature is notable for the largest known stand in the Antarctic of the black-brown moss Andreaea.

Springtail Spur is a spur rising to 170 m at the southwest end of Andreaea Plateau. Named by United Kingdom Antarctic Place-Names Committee (UK-APC) following British Antarctic Survey (BAS) ecological work from the springtail insects (especially Cryptopygus antarcticus) that are abundant beneath stones and in the sparse vegetation of the spur.
