= Crown Head =

Crown Head (60°37′S 45°19′W) is a headland forming the east side of Palmer Bay on the north coast of Coronation Island, in the South Orkney Islands. It was first seen in the course of the joint cruise by Captain George Powell, a British sealer, and Captain Nathaniel Palmer, an American sealer, in December 1821. It was surveyed by the Falkland Islands Dependencies Survey in 1956–58. The name derives from an association with Coronation Island and was given by the UK Antarctic Place-Names Committee in 1959.
