= Coldblow Col =

Coldblow Col (60°37′S 45°41′W) is a snow-covered col at 300 metres (1,000 ft) elevation, between Echo Mountain and the Cragsman Peaks on Coronation Island, in the South Orkney Islands. It was surveyed in 1950 by the Falkland Islands Dependencies Survey (FIDS). The name derives from the fact that a FIDS party had their tent blown down in a gale when camped on this col in September 1948.
