= Snipe Peak =

Mountain in South Orkney Islands

Snipe Peak (60°45′S 45°41′W) is a peak, 225 m, which is the main peak on Moe Island, situated close southwest of Signy Island in the South Orkney Islands. Surveyed in 1933 by DI personnel. The name, proposed by G. Robin of Falkland Islands Dependencies Survey (FIDS) following his survey in 1947, commemorates the first visit to Signy Island, in February 1948, of HMS Snipe (Commander J.G. Forbes, RN).
