= Purdy Point =

Point in the South Orkney Islands, Antarctica

Purdy Point (60°32′S 45°26′W) is a point 1.5 nautical miles (2.8 km) east-southeast of Foul Point on the north coast of Coronation Island, in the South Orkney Islands. First seen in December 1821 in the course of a joint cruise by Captain George Powell, British sealer, and Captain Nathaniel Palmer, American sealer, and roughly shown on Powell's chart. Surveyed by the Falkland Islands Dependencies Survey (FIDS) in 1956-58 and named by the United Kingdom Antarctic Place-Names Committee (UK-APC) in 1959 for John Purdy (1773–1843), a leading English hydrographer of his day, who compiled numerous nautical directories and charts, including the South Orkney Islands, the forerunners of Admiralty sailing directions.
