= Matthews Island =

Island in Antarctica

Coordinates: 60°45′S 45°9′W

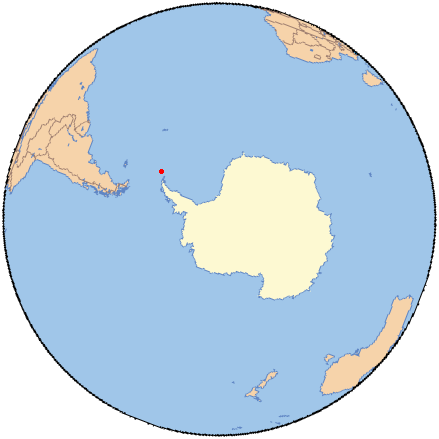
Matthews Island.

Matthews Island is the largest of the Robertson Islands in the South Orkney Islands off Antarctica. It lies immediately south-east of Coronation Island, from which it is separated by a narrow channel known as the Divide. Matthews Island was mapped as part of Coronation Island until January 1957 when a Falkland Islands Dependencies Survey (FIDS) party established its insularity. It was named by the UK Antarctic Place-Names Committee in 1959 for Drummond H. Matthews, a FIDS geologist at Signy Island in 1956.

== Important Bird Area ==
The island is part of the Robertson Islands North Important Bird Area (IBA), identified as such by BirdLife International because it supports substantial breeding colonies of chinstrap penguins totalling about 35,000 pairs, of which some 15,000 pairs nest on Matthews Island.

== See also ==
- List of Antarctic and subantarctic islands
