= Oliphant Islands =

Location of Oliphant Islands in the South Orkney Islands.

Oliphant Islands (60°45′S 45°36′W) is a group of small ice-free islands and rocks lying south of Gourlay Peninsula, the southeast extremity of Signy Island in the South Orkney Islands. Dove Channel extends through this group in a general east-west direction. The group was roughly charted in 1912-13 by Petter Sorlle, Norwegian whaling captain, and again in 1933 by DI personnel. Surveyed in 1947 by the Falkland Islands Dependencies Survey (FIDS) and named by them for Professor Marcus L.E. Oliphant, then professor of physics, Birmingham University; later director of the Research School of Physical Sciences, Australian National University, who gave assistance to the FIDS in obtaining equipment.

== See also ==
- List of antarctic and sub-antarctic islands
