= Skilling =

Skilling may refer to:

Places

- Skilling, Dorset, England
- Skilling Island, Antarctica

People

- Chauncey Fitch Skilling (1868–1945), American architect
- H. Gordon Skilling (1912–2001), Canadian political scientist
- Hugh H. Skilling (1905-1990), American electrical engineer and textbook author
- Jeffrey Skilling (born 1953), American former CEO of Enron Corporation, brother of Tom Skilling
- John Skilling (1921–1998), American civil engineer and architect
- Mark Skilling (born 1972), Scottish footballer
- Tom Skilling (born 1952), American meteorologist in Chicago, Illinois, brother of Jeffrey Skilling

Other

- Skilling (Scandinavian monetary unit), a historical form of currency
- Skilling v. United States, a U.S. Supreme Court case

== See also ==
- Skillings
