= Rime Crests =

Rime Crests (60°38′S 45°25′W) are five crest-like summits surmounting the east side of Sunshine Glacier, Coronation Island, in the South Orkney Islands. The name, originally applied to the highest peak by the Falkland Islands Dependencies Survey (FIDS) following a survey of 1948–49, is descriptive of the feature's heavy cover of hoarfrost, or rime. A collective name for the summits was considered to be more useful.
