= Sørlle Rocks =

Sørlle Rocks (60°37′S 46°15′W) is a group of rocks, the highest 20 metres (66 ft) high, lying 7 nautical miles (13 km) west of Moreton Point, the west extremity of Coronation Island in the South Orkney Islands. It was named Tre Sten ("three stones") on Captain Petter Sørlle's chart resulting from his 1912-13 survey. Later renamed for Sørlle by DI personnel on the Discovery II following their survey in 1933.
