= Cape Sørlle =

Geographical location

Cape Sørlle (60°46′S 44°59′W) is a rocky bluff marking the south end of Fredriksen Island in the South Orkney Islands. Discovered and first charted in 1821 by Captain George Powell and Captain Nathaniel Palmer. Recharted in 1933 by DI personnel on the Discovery II and named for Captain Petter Sørlle, Norwegian whaler who made a running survey of the South Orkney Islands in 1912–13.
