= Findlay Point =

Findlay Point (60°35′S 45°23′W) is a point 2 nautical miles (4 km) northwest of Palmer Bay on the north coast of Coronation Island, in the South Orkney Islands. It was first seen in December 1821 in the course of the joint cruise by Captain George Powell, British sealer, and Captain Nathaniel Palmer, American sealer, and roughly charted by Powell. It was surveyed by the Falkland Islands Dependencies Survey in 1956–58 and named by the UK Antarctic Place-Names Committee for Alexander George Findlay, an English geographer and hydrographer who compiled a long series of nautical directories and charts, including the South Orkney Islands.
