= Whalers Bluff =

Whalers Bluff (60°43′S 45°39′W) is a bluff rising sharply to 210 m east of Port Jebsen, Signy Island, in the South Orkney Islands. The name "Consulens Hat," of unknown origin, was applied to the highest point of the bluff on a 1913 chart by Norwegian whaling captain M. Thoralf Moe. The bluff was named in 1990 by the United Kingdom Antarctic Place-Names Committee (UK-APC) and calls to mind the earlier activities of whalers in this area.
