= Sandefjord Peaks =

Mountain in South Orkney Islands

Sandefjord Peaks (60°37′S 45°59′W) is a set of three conical peaks, the highest 635 m, marking the southwest end of Pomona Plateau at the west end of Coronation Island, in the South Orkney Islands. The southernmost of these peaks was named Sandefjord Peak after nearby Sandefjord Bay by DI personnel in 1933. The collective name, Sandefjord Peaks, was recommended by the United Kingdom Antarctic Place-Names Committee (UK-APC) following a survey of the peaks by the Falkland Islands Dependencies Survey (FIDS) in 1950. They were first climbed in September 1969 by John Edwards, Martin Pinder, Dave Rinning and Eliot Wright after 11 days man-hauling a sledge across from Signy Island
