= Corral Point =

Corral Point (60°45′S 45°43′W) is a rocky headland forming the southwestern extremity of Moe Island in the South Orkney Islands. It was roughly surveyed by Discovery Investigations personnel in 1933, and named by the Falkland Islands Dependencies Survey following their survey of 1947. The Corral Whaling Co. of Bergen, a subsidiary of Messrs. Christensen and Co., Corral, Chile, operated the floating factory Tioga, with its steam whalers Corral and Fyr, in the South Orkney Islands in 1912–13.
