= Shagnasty Island =

Coordinates: 60°44′S 45°38′W

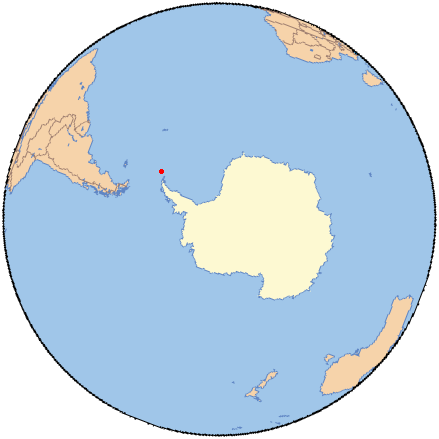
South Orkney Islands, Antarctica

Shagnasty Island is a small, rocky ice-free island lying 0.3 miles (0.5 km) west of Lenton Point in the north part of Clowes Bay, close off the south coast of Signy Island in the South Orkney Islands. Roughly charted in 1933 by Discovery Investigations personnel, and surveyed in 1947 by the Falkland Islands Dependencies Survey (FIDS). The name, chosen by FIDS, arose from the unpleasant state of the island due to its occupation by a large colony of blue-eyed shags (Phalicrocorax atriceps).

== See also ==
- List of antarctic and sub-antarctic islands
