= Confusion (disambiguation) =

Confusion is the state of being bewildered or unclear in one's mind about something.

Confusion or Confused may also refer to:

== Geography ==
- Confusion Bay, Newfoundland and Labrador, a bay in Canada
- Confusion Island, a subantarctic island
- Confusion Lake, a lake in Idaho, U.S.
- Confusion Range, a mountain range in Utah, U.S.
- Confusion Hill, a roadside attraction in Piercy, California, U.S.

== Books ==
- The Confusion, a 2004 novel by Neal Stephenson
- Confusion (novella), a 1927 novella by Stefan Zweig
- Confusions, a 1974 play by Alan Ayckbourn

== Music ==
- Confusion (album), an album by Fela Kuti

=== Songs ===
- "Confusion" (Electric Light Orchestra song)
- "Confusion" (New Order song)
- "Confusion" (The Zutons song)
- "Confused", by SvenDeeKay
- "Confused" (song), by Tevin Campbell
- "Confusion", by Alice in Chains from Facelift
- "Confusion", by Camouflage from Relocated
- "Confusion", by Metallica from Hardwired... to Self-Destruct
- "Confusion", by Miz from Say It's Forever
- "Confusion", by Sparks from Big Beat
- "Confusion", by Zee from Identity
- "Confused", by Angel Witch from Angel Witch
- "Confused", by Spandau Ballet from Journeys to Glory
- "Confused!", by Kid Cudi from Speedin' Bullet 2 Heaven

== Other ==
- Confusion, an unrealized film project of Jacques Tati in collaboration with the music duo Sparks
- ConFusion, an annual science fiction convention in Detroit, Michigan, U.S.
- Confused.com, a British insurance and financial services comparison service
- Apamea furva or confused, a species of moth
- Confusion, a season of the Discordian calendar
- "Confused" (Cow and Chicken), a television episode
- "Confusion", an episode of Code Lyoko: Evolution
- Confusion and diffusion (in cryptography)

== See also ==
- Circle of confusion
- Confusing similarity
- Confusion Corner, a street intersection in Winnipeg, Manitoba, Canada
- Confusion matrix
- Confusion of tongues, the fragmentation of human languages described in the Book of Genesis
