= Limestone valley =

Limestone valley is a geological feature that forms when soft marble or limestone erodes at a rate faster than surrounding hard rock forming a valley surrounded by ridges.

It may also refer to place names:

- Limestone Valley (South Orkney Islands)
- Limestone Valley (Maryland)

== See also ==
- Great Appalachian Valley, sometimes called the Great Limestone Valley
