= Dove Channel =

Dove Channel may refer to:

- Dove Channel (Oliphant Islands), a narrow channel bisecting the Oliphant Islands
- Dove Channel (streaming service), a U.S. Christian-based digital streaming subscription service
