= Skua Terrace =

Skua Terrace (60°41′S 45°38′W) is a terrace in the northwest part of Signy Island, South Orkney Islands, extending north–south from the vicinity of Spindrift Rocks to the vicinity of Express Cove. Named in 1980 by the United Kingdom Antarctic Place-Names Committee (UK-APC) from the numerous pairs of brown skuas nesting in the area.
