= Tioga Hill =

Peak on Signy Island, South Orkney Islands

Tioga Hill (60°44′S 45°39′W) is a rounded summit, 290 metres (950 ft), standing at the west side the head of McLeod Glacier on Signy Island, in the South Orkney Islands. The hill is the highest point on the island. Surveyed in 1947 by the Falkland Islands Dependencies Survey (FIDS). Named by the United Kingdom Antarctic Place-Names Committee (UK-APC) in 1954 for the Tioga, owned by Messrs. Christensen and Co. (Corral, Chile), which was one of the first floating factories to flense whales at sea. It was wrecked at nearby Port Jebsen during a gale on February 4, 1913.

The small Tioga Lake lies to the northwest of the hill.
