= Sandefjord (disambiguation) =

Sandefjord may refer to:

== Places ==
=== Norway ===
- Sandefjord Municipality, a municipality in Vestfold county, Norway
- Sandefjord, a city within Sandefjord municipality in Vestfold county, Norway
- Sandefjordsfjorden, a fjord in Sandefjord municipality in Vestfold county, Norway

=== Antarctica ===
- Sandefjord Cove, a cove on Peter I Island, off the coast of Antarctica
- Sandefjord Ice Bay, an ice bay on Princess Elizabeth Land in Antarctica
- Sandefjord Peaks, mountain peaks in the South Orkney Islands off the coast of Antarctica
- Sandefjord Bay (Coronation Island), a bay on Coronation Island in the South Orkney Islands of Antarctica

== Sport ==
- Sandefjord Arena, a stadium in the city of Sandefjord, Norway
- Sandefjord Fotball, a Norwegian professional football club based in the city of Sandefjord, Norway
- Sandefjord BK, a Norwegian football club from Sandefjord, currently playing in Norwegian Fourth Division
- Sandefjord TIF, a sports club based in the city of Sandefjord, Norway

== Transport ==
- Sandefjord Station, a railway station on the Vestfold Line in Sandefjord, Norway
- Sandefjord Airport, Torp, an airport in Sandefjord municipality in Vestfold county, Norway

== Other ==
- Sandefjord prosti, a deanery within the Church of Norway's Diocese of Tunsberg
- Sandefjord Spa, a now-defunct spa in the city of Sandefjord, Norway
- Sandefjord Museum, a whaling museum in the city of Sandefjord, Norway
- Sandefjords Blad, a newspaper based in the city of Sandefjord, Norway
