= Palmer Bay =

Bay in the South Orkney Islands

Palmer Bay (60°37′S 45°20′W) is a bay 1 nautical mile (1.9 km) wide, lying immediately west of Crown Head on the north coast of Coronation Island, in the South Orkney Islands. Discovered in December 1821 in the course of a joint cruise by Captain George Powell, a British sealer in the sloop Dove and Captain Nathaniel Palmer, an American sealer in the sloop James Monroe. Named for Captain Palmer.
