= Knob Lake =

Knob Lake may refer to:

- an eponymous lake in the Three Lakes Valley in the South Orkney Islands
- Schefferville, historically known as Knob Lake
- Knob Lake (Kenora District), Ontario
- Knob Lake (Sudbury District), Ontario
