= Tioga Lake (South Orkney Islands) =

- Location within South Orkney Islands
- Location: South Orkney Islands
- Coordinates: 60°42′S 45°39′W

Tioga Lake (60°42′S 45°39′W) is a small lake in the South Orkney Islands. It lies north-northeast of Port Jebsen and northwest of Tioga Hill, from which it takes its name, on Signy Island. Named by the United Kingdom Antarctic Place-Names Committee (UK-APC) in 1981.
