= Three Lakes Valley =

Three Lakes Valley can refer to:

- Fountain Valley (British Columbia) (officially Three Lake Valley)
- Three Lakes Valley (Nevada)
- Three Lakes Valley (South Orkney Islands)
- Martin Valley, South Georgia (unofficial local name)
