= Amos Lake =

Amos Lake may refer to:

- Amos Lake (Antarctica), a lake on Signy Island
- Amos Lake (Minnesota), a lake in Douglas County
- Amos Lake (Connecticut), a lake in New London County
