= Jensen Ridge =

Ridge in the South Orkney Islands

Jensen Ridge (60°41′S 45°38′W) is a curving ridge running eastward from Foca Point toward Jane Col on Signy Island in the South Orkney Islands. It was named in 1991 by the UK Antarctic Place-Names Committee after Captain Gullik Jensen, of the whaling ship Strombus from Tønsberg, Norway, who made the last whaling expedition to Signy Island in 1935–36.
