= A. nivea =

A. nivea may refer to:

- Acentria nivea, a synonym for Acentria ephemerella, the watermilfoil moth or water veneer, a moth species
- Argyrochosma nivea, an Andean fern species
- Aria nivea, a synonym for Sorbus aria, the whitebeam or common whitebeam, a tree species
- Asclepias nivea, the Caribbean milkweed, a plant species

== See also ==
- Nivea (disambiguation)
