= Inaccessible Island (disambiguation) =

Inaccessible Island may refer to:

- Inaccessible Island, Tristan da Cunha, South Atlantic
- Inaccessible Island (Dellbridge Islands), Antarctica
- Inaccessible Islands, South Orkney Islands, South Atlantic
