= McLeod Glacier =

McLeod Glacier may refer to one of two glaciers in Antarctica:

- McLeod Glacier (South Orkney Islands)
- McLeod Glacier (Wilson Hills)
