= Deacon Hill =

Deacon Hill may refer to:

- Deacon Hill SSSI, a protected area in Bedfordshire, United Kingdom, also the namesake hill in the protected area
- Deacon Hill (Antarctica), Coronation Island, South Orkney Islands
- Deacon Hill (American football) (born 2003), American college football quarterback

== See also ==
- Deacon's Hill, Hertfordshire
