= Limestone Valley (South Orkney Islands) =

Valley in the South Orkney Islands

Limestone Valley (60°42′S 45°37′W) is a valley extending northwest from Cemetery Bay, Signy Island, in the South Orkney Islands. The valley leads directly to Jane Col and serves as a route to the west coast of the island. It was so named by the UK Antarctic Place-Names Committee because of an exposure of limestone in the cliff above the valley.
