= Cryptogam Ridge =

Cryptogam Ridge (60°43′S 45°40′W) is an east–west ridge lying south of Cummings Cove in Signy Island, South Orkney Islands. The north-facing slope of the ridge supports a diversity of lichens and mosses, collectively referred to as cryptogams (spore-producing plants). It was named by the UK Antarctic Place-Names Committee in 1991.
