= Conception Point =

Coordinates: 60°31′S 45°41′W

Conception Point is the northernmost point on Coronation Island in the South Orkney Islands. It was discovered on 8 December 1821, in the course of the joint cruise by Captain George Powell, British sealer, and Captain Nathaniel Palmer, American sealer. It was named by Captain Powell.
