= Dove Channel (Oliphant Islands) =

Dove Channel (60°45′S 45°36′W) is a narrow channel bisecting the Oliphant Islands, trending in an east–west direction between the two larger islands on the north and the main group of smaller islands and rocks on the south, lying 0.4 nautical miles (0.7 km) south of Gourlay Peninsula, the southeast tip of Signy Island in the South Orkney Islands. The name "Dove Strait" dates back to about 1930, but the generic term channel is approved because of the small size of this feature.
