= Cape Vik =

Cape in the South Orkney Islands, Antarctica

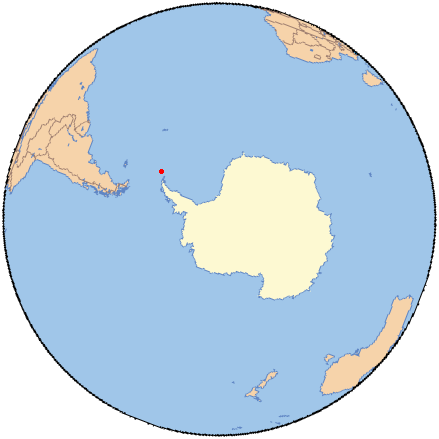
South Orkney Islands.

Cape Vik (60°40′S 45°40′W) is a cape marking the west side of the entrance to Marshall Bay on the south coast of Coronation Island, in the South Orkney Islands. The cape appears to be first shown and named on a chart made by the Norwegian whaler Captain Petter Sorlle in 1912–13.

Maling Peak is just northwest of the cape.
