= Tønsberg (disambiguation) =

Tønsberg or Tönsberg may refer to:

== Places ==
- Tønsberg Municipality, a municipality in Vestfold county, Norway
  - Tønsberg (town), a town/city in Tønsberg municipality in Vestfold county, Norway
  - Tønsberg Station, a railway station in the city of Tønsberg in Tønsberg municipality in Vestfold county, Norway
  - Tønsberg Hospital, a hospital in Tønsberg municipality in Vestfold county, Norway
  - Tønsberg Region, a statistical region in Norway
  - Tønsberg Airport, Jarlsberg, an airport in Tønsberg municipality in Vestfold county, Norway
  - Tønsberg Tønne, a nautical marker in Tønsberg municipality in Vestfold county, Norway
- Tønsberg Point, a low rocky peninsula which projects into Stromness Bay in the South Georgia Islands
- Tønsberg Cove, a cove on the north coast of Coronation Island in the South Orkney Islands
- Tönsberg, a hill in the district of Lippe in Germany

== People ==
- Anette Tønsberg (born 1970), a Norwegian speed skater
- Christian Tønsberg (1838–1897), a Norwegian publisher and author
- Mats de Tonsberg (1638–1705), a Norwegian civil servant and timber trader
- Reidar Tønsberg (1893–1956), a Norwegian gymnast who competed in the 1920 Summer Olympics
- Tor Tønsberg (born 1948), a Norwegian lichenologist

== Religion ==
- Tønsberg domprosti, a deanery within the Church of Norway, based in Tønsberg, Norway
- Tønsberg Cathedral, a cathedral in Tønsberg municipality in Vestfold county, Norway

== Sport ==
- FK Tønsberg, a football club from Tønsberg, Norway
- Tønsberg FIK, a track and field club from Tønsberg, Norway
- Flint Tønsberg, the women's handball team in Tønsberg, Norway
- Tønsberg Gressbane, a football stadium in Tønsberg, Norway
- Tønsbergs TF, a sports club from Tønsberg, Norway
- Tønsberg Ishall, an ice hockey- and figure skating arena in Tønsberg, Norway

== Other ==
- MV Tønsberg, a roll-on/roll-off ship owned by Wilh. Wilhelmsen
- Tønsbergs Blad, a newspaper based in Tønsberg municipality in Vestfold county, Norway
