= Atriceps Island =

Antarctic island

- Location within Antarctica

Geography
- Location: Antarctica
- Coordinates: 60°47′S 45°9′W

Administration
- Administered under the Antarctic Treaty System

Demographics
- Population: Uninhabited

Atriceps Island is the southernmost of the Robertson Islands, lying 5.6 kilometres (3 nmi) south of the south-east end of Coronation Island in the South Orkney Islands of Antarctica. The island has been identified as an Important Bird Area by BirdLife International because it supports a breeding colony of imperial shags (Phalacrocorax atriceps), after which the island was named in 1948–49 by the Falkland Islands Dependencies Survey, with 524 pairs recorded in 1988.

== See also ==
- List of Antarctic and subantarctic islands
