= Gneiss (disambiguation) =

Gneiss is a common and widely distributed type of metamorphic rock

Gneiss may also refer to:

== Places ==
- Gneiss Hills and Gneiss Lake, in Antarctica
- Gneiss Point, in Antarctica

== Other uses ==
- Gneiss-2, a Soviet airborne radar system
