= Tilbrook Hill =

Tilbrook Hill (60°44′S 45°36′W) is a hill rising to 70 m between Hillier Moss and Caloplaca Cove in southeast Signy Island, South Orkney Islands. Named by the United Kingdom Antarctic Place-Names Committee (UK-APC) in 1990 after Peter J. Tilbrook, British Antarctic Survey (BAS) terrestrial biologist, 1961-75 (latterly Head, Terrestrial Biology Section), who initiated two long-term research sites close to this feature.
