= Everson Ridge =

Everson Ridge (60°43′S 45°39′W) is a ridge extending from Jebsen Point to Tioga Hill on Signy Island. It was named by the UK Antarctic Place-Names Committee after Inigo Everson, a British Antarctic Survey biologist on Signy Island, 1965–66.
