= Gneiss Hills =

Hills in Antarctica

The Gneiss Hills (60°44′S 45°39′W) are two prominent hills, 270 and 260 metres (890 and 850 ft) high, at the west side of McLeod Glacier in the south part of Signy Island, in the South Orkney Islands, Antarctica. They were so named by the Falkland Islands Dependencies Survey, following their survey of 1947, because of a band of pink gneiss outcrops near the summits.

Gneiss Lake is a small lake on the west side of the hills. The lake is permanently ice covered and is visible only in summer when melting occurs at the perimeter. It was named in 1981 by the UK Antarctic Place-Names Committee in association with the hills.
