= Nivea (disambiguation) =

Nivea is a brand of cosmetics.

It may also refer to:

- Nivea (given name)
- Nivea (singer) (born 1982), American R&B singer
  - Nivea (album), her 2001 debut album
- Mount Nivea, South Orkney Islands

== See also ==
- niveum
