= Orwell Glacier =

Glacier in Antarctica

- Location within South Orkney Islands
- Location: South Orkney Islands
- Coordinates: 60°43′S 45°38′W
- Length: 0.5 nmi (1 km; 1 mi)
- Thickness: unknown
- Terminus: Elephant Flats
- Status: unknown

Orwell Glacier (60°43′S 45°38′W) is a small glacier, less than 0.5 nautical miles (0.9 km) long, which descends steeply from the south slopes of Snow Hills and terminates in 20 m ice cliffs along the south margin of Elephant Flats in the east part of Signy Island, in the South Orkney Islands. Surveyed by DI personnel in 1927 and named by them for the Norwegian transport throughout the seasons 1925–26 to 1929–30. It was resurveyed by the Falkland Islands Dependencies Survey (FIDS) in 1947.

== See also ==
- List of glaciers in the Antarctic
- Glaciology
