= Foul Point =

Coordinates: 60°32′S 45°29′W

Foul Point on Yordanov Island lies at the east side of the entrance to Ommanney Bay on the north side of Coronation Island in the South Orkney Islands. It was discovered in December 1821 in the course of the joint cruise by Captain George Powell, British sealer, and Captain Nathaniel Palmer, American sealer. The name first appears on Powell's chart, published in 1822. It is basically an area of ice-free coastal terrain with large seabird colonies and lichen-dominated cliffs, and permanent ice rising to the Brisbane Heights plateau, which provides an excellent representative area of a pristine ice environment near the northern limit of the maritime Antarctic.
