= Skillings =

Skillings is an English surname. Notable people with the surname include:

- David Skillings, American lumber magnate and builder of the Skillings Estate House
- Muzz Skillings, American musician, bassist for the band Living Colour
- Waldo McTavish Skillings (1906–1981), insurance agent and political figure in British Columbia

== See also ==
- Skilling (disambiguation)
