= Mount Nivea =

Mountain in the South Orkney Islands

Mount Nivea (60°35′S 45°29′W) is a conspicuous, snow-topped, 1,265 m high mountain at the head of Sunshine Glacier on Coronation Island, in the South Orkney Islands. A number of rock towers lie on the northwest side. It was surveyed by the Falkland Islands Dependencies Survey (FIDS) in 1948–49, and named by them for the snow petrel (Pagodroma nivea) which breeds in this area.
