= Jane Col =

Jane Col (60°42′S 45°38′W) is a col to the west of Jane Peak at the head of Limestone Valley on Signy Island in the South Orkney Islands. It was named in association with Jane Peak by the UK Antarctic Place-Names Committee.
