= Ommanney Bay (Coronation Island) =

Small bay in Antarctica

Ommanney Bay (60°33′S 45°32′W) is a bay 2 mi (3.2 km) wide between Prong Point and Foul Point on the north coast of Coronation Island, in the South Orkney Islands of Antarctica. Like much of Coronation Island and its surrounding features, it was first seen and roughly charted by Captain George Powell and Captain Nathaniel Palmer in 1821. It was recharted in 1933 by Discovery Investigations personnel on the Discovery II and named for Francis D. Ommanney, zoologist on the staff of the Discovery Committee.

Prong Point is a narrow protruding headland forming the west side of the entrance to Ommanney Bay. After being charted by Powell and Palmer in 1821, it was surveyed by the Falkland Islands Dependencies Survey (FIDS) in 1956–58. The United Kingdom Antarctic Place-Names Committee (UK-APC) named it in 1959.
