= Jane Peak =

Mountain in the South Orkney Islands

- Nunatak
- Coordinates: 60°43′S 45°38′W

Jane Peak is a conspicuous nunatak, 210 metres (700 ft) high, standing 0.5 nautical miles (1 km) west of the northern part of Borge Bay on Signy Island, in the South Orkney Islands.

It was roughly surveyed in 1933 by Discovery Investigations personnel, and resurveyed in 1947 by the Falkland Islands Dependencies Survey. It was named in 1954 by the UK Antarctic Place-Names Committee for the brig Jane, James Weddell commanding, which visited the South Orkney Islands in 1822–23.
