= Nivea (given name) =

Nivea or Nívea is a feminine given name. Notable people with the name include:

- Nivea Hamilton (born 1982), American singer
- Nívea Maria (born 1947), Brazilian actress
- Nivea Smith (born 1990), Bahamian sprinter who specializes in the 200 metres
- Nívea Soares (born 1976), Brazilian songwriter and singer of gospel music
- Nívea Stelmann (born 1974), Brazilian actress

== See also ==
- Nivea (disambiguation)
