= Robin Peak =

Mountain in South Orkney Islands

Robin Peak (60°41′S 45°37′W) is a sharply defined rocky summit (270 m) which is the northernmost peak on Signy Island in the South Orkney Islands. It was named by the United Kingdom Antarctic Place-Names Committee (UK-APC) in 1954 for Gordon de Quetteville Robin of the Falkland Islands Dependencies Survey (FIDS), the leader at Signy Island base in 1947, who made the first detailed survey of the island.
