= Marshall Bay =

Bay in Antarctica

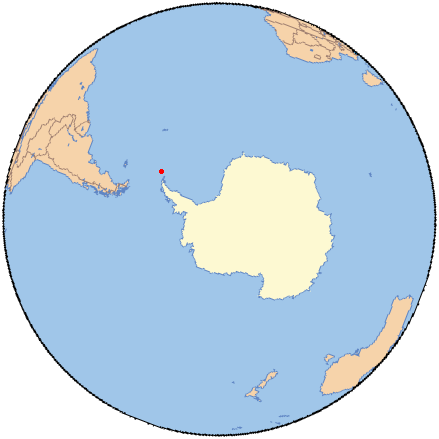
South Orkney Islands.

Marshall Bay (60°39′S 45°38′W) is a bay 2 nautical miles (4 km), lying between Cape Vik and Cape Hansen on the south side of Coronation Island, in the South Orkney Islands, Antarctica. It was roughly charted in 1912–13 by Petter Sørlle, a Norwegian whaling captain. The bay was recharted in 1933 by Discovery Investigations personnel on the Discovery II, who gave the name for surgeon Dr. E.H. Marshall, a member of the Marine Executive Staff of the Discovery Committee.
