= Paternoster Valley =

Valley in northern Signy Island

Paternoster Valley (60°41′S 45°37′W) is a valley extending southwestward from Stygian Cove in northern Signy Island. So named by United Kingdom Antarctic Place-Names Committee (UK-APC) from the occurrence of three small paternoster lakes, at different levels in the valley.

Sombre Lake is the northernmost lake, so named by UK-APC because of the sombre setting of the lake and the proximity of Stygian Cove. Changing Lake is the central lakes. This proglacial lake was named by UK-APC because the lake slowly changes shape and size as the retaining land ice gradually retreats. Moss Lake is the southernmost lake, named by UK-APC because a luxuriant stand of moss covers the deeper part of the lake.
