= Inaccessible Islands =

Islands of Antarctica

- Location of the Inaccessible Islands in the South Orkney Islands

- Location within Antarctica

Geography
- Location: Antarctica
- Coordinates: 60°34′S 46°44′W
- Highest elevation: 215 m (705 ft)

Administration
- Administered under the Antarctic Treaty System

Demographics
- Population: 0

The Inaccessible Islands ("Islas Inaccesibles" in Spanish) are a group of small precipitous islands ranging from 120 to 215 m (394 to 705 ft) high, the westernmost features of the South Orkney Islands, lying 20 km (12 mi) west of Coronation Island in Antarctica. They were discovered in December 1821 by Captain George Powell, a British sealer in the sloop James Monroe, though it is possible they are the "Seal Islands" seen by Nathaniel Palmer a year earlier. The islands were so named by Powell because of their appearance of inaccessibility. They are considered part of the British Antarctic Territory by the United Kingdom and part of the Province of Tierra del Fuego by Argentina.

== Important Bird Area ==
The islands have been identified as an Important Bird Area (IBA) by BirdLife International because they support a large breeding colony of southern fulmars (50,000 pairs). Other birds nesting at the site include chinstrap penguins (1,000 pairs) and Antarctic shags (100 pairs).

== See also ==
- List of Antarctic islands south of 60° S
