= Robertson Islands =

Islands of Antarctica

- Location within Antarctica

Geography
- Location: Antarctica
- Coordinates: 60°46′S 45°09′W
- Archipelago: South Orkney Islands
- Highest elevation: 250 m (820 ft)

Administration
- Administered under the Antarctic Treaty System

Demographics
- Population: Uninhabited

The Robertson Islands or Robertsons Islands are a group of islands extending 6 km southward of the south-eastern extremity of Coronation Island in the South Orkney Islands of Antarctica. They were discovered and roughly charted by Captains George Powell and Nathaniel Palmer in December 1821 and named by James Weddell in 1823.

== Important Bird Area ==
The northern islands of the group (those north of Atriceps Island), including Matthews, Coffer, Steepholm and Skilling Islands with their associated islets and skerries, have been identified as an Important Bird Area (IBA) by BirdLife International because they support substantial breeding colonies, totalling about 35,000 pairs, of chinstrap penguins. Snow petrels also breed in the area of the Divide – the narrow channel separating Matthews from Coronation Island at the northern limit of the IBA.

== See also ==
- List of Antarctic and Subantarctic islands
