= Snow Hills =

Mountain in Antarctica

Snow Hills (60°42′S 45°38′W) are two snow-covered hills, one 240 m, the other 265 m and 0.25 nautical miles (0.5 km) to the west. Located 0.2 nautical miles (0.4 km) west of Cemetery Bay in the east-central part of Signy Island. The lower, eastern hill was charted and named "Snow Hill" by DI personnel on the Discovery II in 1933. In local usage the name Snow Hills has become established for both hills.
