= Endurance Ridge =

Undersea ridge southeast of the South Orkney Islands

Endurance Ridge (62°30′S 40°0′W) is an Antarctic undersea ridge, south-east of Coronation Island in the South Atlantic Ocean. It was named after the Endurance Expedition of 1914–1917, and its name was approved by the Advisory Committee for Undersea Features in June 1987.
