= Sørlle Buttress =

Sørlle Buttress (54°17′S 36°50′W) is a mountain rising above 1,370 metres (4,490 ft), between Mount Spaaman and Three Brothers in the Allardyce Range of South Georgia. It was surveyed by the South Georgia Survey in the period 1951-57 and named by the United Kingdom Antarctic Place-Names Committee for Petter Sørlle (1884–1922), a Norwegian whaling captain and inventor who, in 1922, took out a patent for his whaling slipway. Sørlle was the first manager of the United Whalers station at Stromness.
