= Olivine Point =

Olivine Point (60°40′S 45°29′W) is the southern end of the low-lying peninsula which forms the east limit of Iceberg Bay on the south coast of Coronation Island, in the South Orkney Islands. Surveyed by the Falkland Islands Dependencies Survey (FIDS) in 1948–49, and so named by them because the mineral olivine occurs in the igneous dikes intersecting the peninsula just north of the point.
