= Mount Spaaman =

Mountain in South Georgia

Mount Spaaman (54°16′S 36°52′W) is a mountain, 1,940 m, standing 1 nautical mile (1.9 km) west of Sørlle Buttress in the west part of the Allardyce Range of South Georgia. The name "Spaaman" is well established in local use. No precise translation is possible; it means roughly a weather prophet or a fortuneteller. The name arose because the emergence of this mountain from its usual heavy cloud cover is said locally to be a sign of good weather.
