= List of glaciers of Queen Mary Land =

Following is a list of glaciers of Queen Mary Land in Antarctica. This list may not reflect recently named glaciers in Queen Mary Land.

- Apfel Glacier
- Denman Glacier
- Northcliffe Glacier
- Roscoe Glacier
- Scott Glacier
