= Confusion Island =

Island in Antarctica

Confusion Island (60°44′S 45°38′W) is an island 0.2 nautical miles (0.4 km) long at the west side of the entrance to Clowes Bay, off the south side of Signy Island.

The southern point of the island was charted and named Confusion Point by Discovery Investigations personnel on the Discovery II in 1933.

The UK Antarctic Place-Names Committee altered the name in 1974, extending the application to the entire island.

== See also ==
- List of antarctic and sub-antarctic islands
