= Hugh H. Skilling =

American educator, electrical engineer, author (1905 – 1990)

Hugh Hildreth Skilling
- Born: September 2, 1905; San Diego, California, US
- Died: October 23, 1990 (aged 85); Stanford, California, US
- Spouse: Hazel Dillon Skilling
- Children: 1

Hugh Hildreth Skilling (1905 - 1990) was a Stanford University professor and a prolific author of electrical engineering textbooks.

Hugh Skilling was born on September 2, 1905, in San Diego, California to William Thompson Skilling and Bird Hildreth Skilling. He earned a Bachelor of Arts degree in mechanical engineering in 1926 and an engineers degree in electrical engineering in 1927, both from Stanford University. From 1927 to 1929, he was employed in the construction department of the Southern California Edison Company, working onsite at the Big Creek Hydroelectric Project. He joined the Stanford faculty from 1928 to 1929, and then took a break to continue his graduate studies at MIT where he earned a Master of Science degree in 1930. He returned to his Stanford faculty position in 1931 and also earned a Ph.D. from Stanford in the same year. Hugh married Hazel Dillon on June 21, 1932. He continued as a Stanford University professor in electrical engineering until he retired in 1971. During that time, he was head of the department from 1944 to 1967.

== Books and Other Publications ==
Hugh Skilling wrote several research articles early in his career, including papers on electrical analogs of mechanical properties, mechanical analogs of electrical properties, long-distance power transmission, and the electrical breakdown of air through coronal discharge. However, his primary publications were numerous textbooks and other books about electrical engineering and/or teaching.

- Transient Electric Currents (McGraw-Hill Book Company, Inc., 1937, Second ed. 1952)
- Fundamentals of Electric Waves (John Wiley & Sons, Inc., 1942, Second ed. 1948)
- Exploring Electricity: Man's Unfinished Quest (The Ronald Press Company, 1948, Second ed. 1962)
- Electric Transmission Lines: Distributed Constants, Theory and Applications (McGraw-Hill Book Company Inc., 1951)
- Electrical Engineering Circuits (John Wiley & Sons Inc., 1957, Second ed. 1965)
- A First Course in Electromechanics (John Wiley & Sons Inc., 1960)
- Electromechanics: A First Course in Electromechanical Energy Conversion (John Wiley & Sons Inc., 1962)
- Do You Teach? Views on College Teaching (Holt, Rinehart and Winston, 1969)
- Electric Networks (John Wiley & Sons Inc., 1974)
- Teaching Engineering, Science, Mathematics: Guidance by Distinguished Teachers (Krieger Publishing Co., 1977)

== Recognition ==
- Awarded the IEEE James H. Mulligan Jr. Education Medal in 1965
- Member of Phi Beta Kappa, Sigma Xi, and A.I.E.E.
- Served on several Stanford committees, including one that revised the general education program for undergraduates, the faculty Executive Committee, and the Committee on University Policy. He was also on the Stanford Advisory Board, which is a small elected group that advises the university president on policy matters and reviews new appointments.
- Served as a Supervisor of the U.S. Army Signal Corps Radio Training Program (1942–43), and as assistant director of the Engineering Unit of the Army Specialized Training Program (1942–44). He was chosen as a civilian observer of a Bikini Atoll nuclear bomb test.
- Stanford's Hugh Hildreth Skilling building (494 Lomita Mall, Stanford) is named in his honor. It houses the Skilling auditorium and engineering classrooms.
