= Brisbane Heights =

Coordinates: 60°36′S 45°38′W

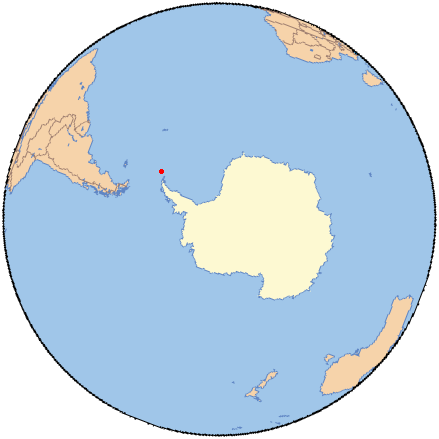
South Orkney Islands.

Brisbane Heights are a series of heights rising to 960 metres (3,150 ft) and extending in an arc from Worswick Hill to High Stile in the central part of Coronation Island, South Orkney Islands. The feature was named Brisbane Plateau following the Falkland Islands Dependencies Survey survey of 1948–49, but resurvey in 1956 determined heights to be a more suitable descriptive term. Matthew Brisbane, master of the cutter Beaufoy, accompanied James Weddell, master of the brig Jane, to the South Orkney Islands in January 1823, and roughly charted the south coast of the group.
