= Iceberg Bay =

Bay of Antarctica

Coordinates: 60°39′S 45°32′W

Iceberg Bay is a bay 3 miles (5 km) wide, which indents the south coast of Coronation Island between Cape Hansen and Olivine Point, in the South Orkney Islands, Antarctica. It was named by Matthew Brisbane, who roughly charted the south coast of Coronation Island under the direction of James Weddell in 1823. Beaufoy Ridge and Sunshine Glacier lie close north of Iceberg Bay.

Shingle Cove is a small sheltered cove in the northwest corner of Iceberg Bay on the south coast of Coronation Island, in the South Orkney Islands. It was first surveyed by Discovery Investigations personnel in 1933. The name, applied by the Falkland Islands Dependencies Survey (FIDS) following their survey of 1948–49, arose from the fine shingle on the landing beach on the south shore of the cove.
