= List of glaciers in the Antarctic =

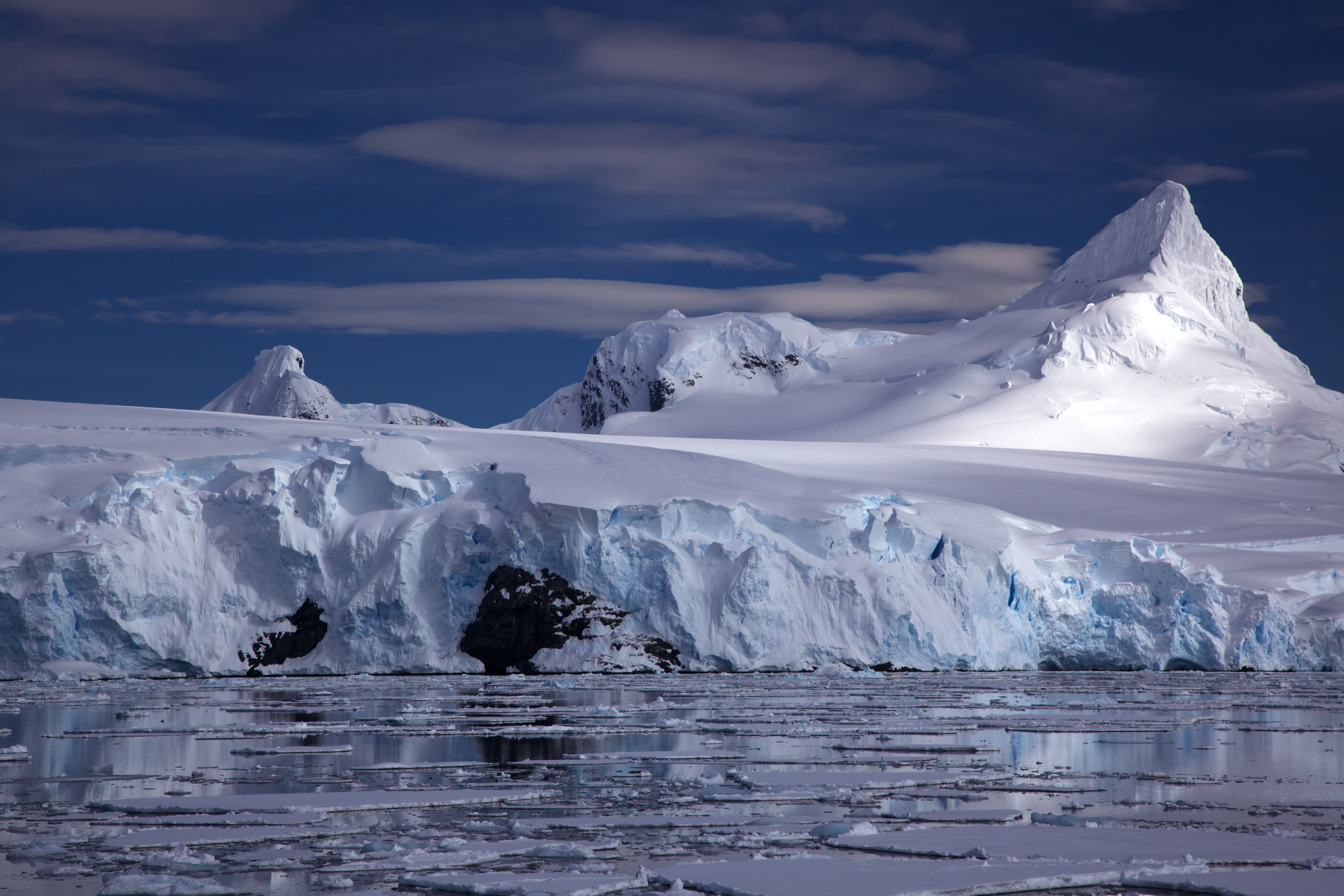
Tidewater glacier on the Antarctic coast

There are many glaciers in the Antarctic. This set of lists does not include ice sheets, ice caps or ice fields, such as the Antarctic ice sheet, but includes glacial features that are defined by their flow, rather than general bodies of ice. The lists include outlet glaciers, valley glaciers, cirque glaciers, tidewater glaciers and ice streams. Ice streams are a type of glacier and many of them have "glacier" in their name, e.g. Pine Island Glacier. Ice shelves are listed separately in the List of Antarctic ice shelves. For the purposes of these lists, the Antarctic is defined as any latitude further south than 60° (the continental limit according to the Antarctic Treaty System).

== List by letters ==
- List of glaciers in the Antarctic: A–H
- List of glaciers in the Antarctic: I–Z

== Lists by regions ==
- List of glaciers of Adélie Land
- List of glaciers of Bouvet Island
- List of glaciers of Coats Land
- List of glaciers of Ellsworth Land
- List of glaciers of Enderby Land
- List of glaciers of Graham Land
- List of glaciers of Heard Island and McDonald Islands
- List of glaciers of James Ross Island and Graham Land
- List of glaciers of Kaiser Wilhelm II Land
- List of glaciers of Kemp Land
- List of glaciers of Mac. Robertson Land
- List of glaciers of Marie Byrd Land
- List of glaciers of Oates Land
- List of glaciers of the Palmer Archipelago and Graham Land
- List of glaciers of Palmer Land
- List of glaciers of Princess Elizabeth Land
- List of glaciers of Queen Elizabeth Land
- List of glaciers of Queen Mary Land
- List of glaciers of Queen Maud Land
- List of glaciers of the Ross Dependency
- List of glaciers of South Georgia
- List of glaciers of South Shetland Islands
- List of glaciers of the South Orkney Islands
- List of glaciers of the Trinity Peninsula and Graham Land
- List of glaciers of Victoria Land
- List of glaciers of Wilkes Land

== See also ==
- List of Antarctic and subantarctic islands
- List of Antarctic ice rises
- List of Antarctic ice shelves
- List of Antarctic ice streams
- List of glaciers
- List of subantarctic glaciers
