= List of glaciers of Queen Elizabeth Land =

Map of Queen Elizabeth Land (shaded)

Following is a list of glaciers of Queen Elizabeth Land in Antarctica. This list may not reflect recently named glaciers in Queen Elizabeth Land.

- Academy Glacier
- Chambers Glacier
- Childs Glacier
- Edge Glacier
- Jaburg Glacier
- Kovacs Glacier
- MacNamara Glacier
- San Martín Glacier
