= Beaufoy =

Beaufoy is a surname. Notable people with the surname include:

- Henry Beaufoy (1750–1795), British politician
- Mark Beaufoy (1764–1827), English astronomer, physicist, mountaineer, explorer, and British Army officer
- Mark Hanbury Beaufoy (1854–1922), British vinegar manufacturer and politician
- Simon Beaufoy (born 1966), British screenwriter
