= Sunshine Glacier =

Glacier on Coronation Island, Antarctica

- Location within South Orkney Islands
- Location: South Orkney Islands
- Coordinates: 60°38′S 45°30′W
- Length: 3 nmi (6 km; 3 mi)
- Width: 2 nmi (4 km; 2 mi)
- Thickness: unknown
- Terminus: Iceberg Bay
- Status: unknown

Sunshine Glacier (60°38′S 45°30′W) is a glacier, 3 nautical miles (6 km) long and 2 nautical miles (3.7 km) wide, flowing south into Iceberg Bay on the south coast of Coronation Island, in the South Orkney Islands. It is the largest glacier on the south side of Coronation Island and terminates in ice cliffs up to 60 m high. Surveyed in 1948-49 by the Falkland Islands Dependencies Survey (FIDS) and so named by them because, when all else was in shadow, small gaps in the clouds above frequently allowed patches of sunshine to appear on the surface of this glacier. At the west side of Sunshine Glacier stands the conspicuous black ridge of Beaufoy Ridge, rising to 650 metres (2,130 ft) at its northwest end.

== See also ==
- List of glaciers in the Antarctic
- Glaciology
