= Three Lakes Valley (South Orkney Islands) =

- Location within South Orkney Islands

Geography
- Location: Signy Island, South Orkney Islands
- Coordinates: 60°42′S 45°37′W
- Interactive map of Three Lakes Valley

Three Lakes Valley (60°42′S 45°37′W) is a low valley containing three freshwater lakes, extending from the vicinity of Elephant Flats northward to Stygian Cove on Signy Island, in the South Orkney Islands. The three lakes, from north to south, are Heywood Lake, Knob Lake, and Pumphouse Lake. The valley was surveyed and given this descriptive name by the Falkland Islands Dependencies Survey (FIDS) in 1947.

Heywood Lake is the northernmost lake in the valley. It was named by the UK Antarctic Place-Names Committee (UK-APC) after Ronald B. Heywood, a limnologist with the British Antarctic Survey.

Knob Lake is the central lake in the valley. It was named by UK-APC because there is a glacier-scoured rock knob forming a small island near the south end of the lake.

Pumphouse Lake is the southernmost of the three lakes. It was named by UK-APC because of the abandoned pump house and pipeline, built by whalers, on the east side of the lake.
