= Spindrift Col =

Mountain pass on Signy Island in the South Orkney Islands

South Orkney Islands
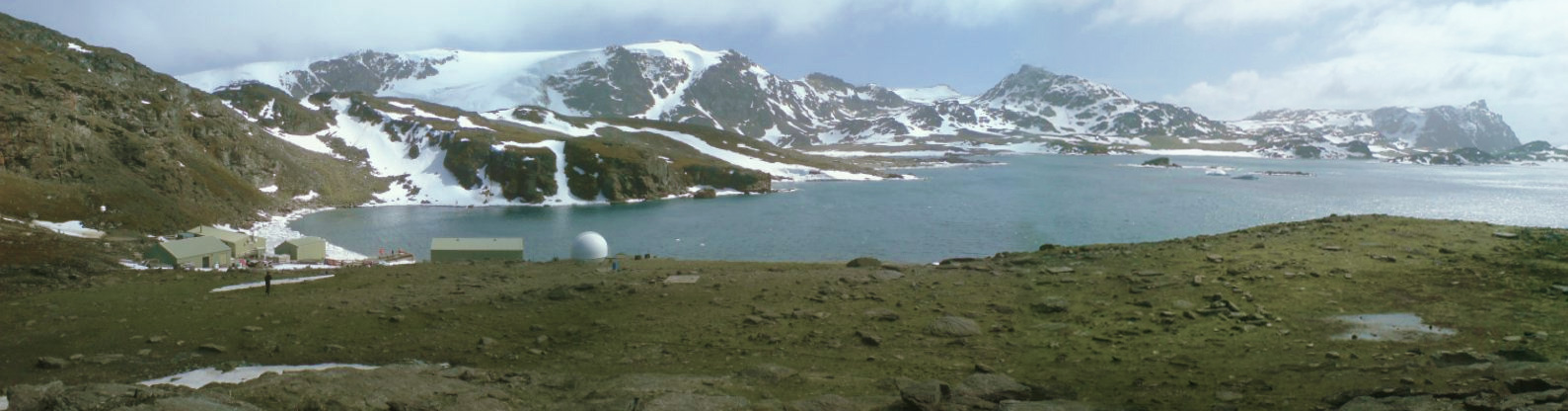
- Signy Island base and panorama

- Map of the South Orkney Islands

Geography
- Coordinates: 60°36′S 45°30′W
- Area: 620 km^{2} (240 sq mi)
- Highest elevation: 4,153 ft (1265.8 m)

Administration
- Administered under the Antarctic Treaty System

Demographics
- Population: approx. 53-55 (summer) 14 (winter)

Spindrift Col is a mountain pass running through north-central Signy Island in the South Orkney Islands. It is located 0.5 nautical miles (0.9 km) southeast of Spindrift Rocks, its namesake.

It was named by the United Kingdom Antarctic Place-Names Committee (UK-APC) in 1974, after the sea spray that occurs in their surroundings with strong westerly winds.
