= Moe Island =

Island of Antarctica

Coordinates: 60°45′S 45°42′W

Location of Moe Island in the South Orkney Islands.

Moe Island is an island 2 km (1.2 mi) long in the South Orkney Islands off Antarctica, separated from the south-west end of Signy Island by Fyr Channel. It was charted by Captain Petter Sørlle in 1912–13, and named after M. Thoralf Moe of Sandefjord, Norway, a contemporary whaling captain who worked in this area. The northernmost point of the island is Spaull Point, named by United Kingdom Antarctic Place-Names Committee (UK-APC) after Vaughan W. Spaull, British Antarctic Survey (BAS) biologist on Signy Island, 1969.

== Antarctic Specially Protected Area ==
The island has been designated an Antarctic Specially Protected Area (ASPA 109) mainly for its biological values, especially the banks of Chorisodontium–Polytrichum moss turf and Andreaea–Usnea fellfield. The cryptogamic flora is diverse, though in places the moss turf is subject to damage by Antarctic fur seals. The mites Stereotydeus villosus and Gamasellus racovitzai, as well as the springtail Cryptopygus antarcticus, are common beneath stones.

== Important Bird Area ==
Moe Island has been identified as an Important Bird Area (IBA) by BirdLife International because it supports breeding colonies of seabirds. Some 11,000 pairs of chinstrap penguins were recorded in 1978–79, though subsequently their numbers have declined with only about 100 pairs present in January 2006. Other birds recorded nesting at the site include Cape petrels, Antarctic prions and snow petrels.

== See also ==
- List of Antarctic and subantarctic islands
- Snipe Peak
