= McLeod Glacier (South Orkney Islands) =

Glacier in the South Orkney Islands

- Location within South Orkney Islands
- Location: South Orkney Islands
- Coordinates: 60°44′S 45°38′W
- Length: 1 nmi (2 km; 1 mi)
- Terminus: Clowes Bay

McLeod Glacier is a glacier 1 nautical mile (2 km) long, flowing in a southeasterly direction into Clowes Bay on the south side of Signy Island, in the South Orkney Islands off Antarctica. It was named by the UK Antarctic Place-Names Committee in 1954 for Michael McLeod, following a survey by the Falkland Islands Dependencies Survey in 1947. On 12 December 1821, the cutter Beaufoy under McLeod sailed to a position at least 60 nautical miles (110 km) west of the South Orkney Islands, where a chart annotation indicates that land was sighted, possibly Coronation Island.

== See also ==
- List of glaciers in the Antarctic
- Glaciology
