= Norway Bight =

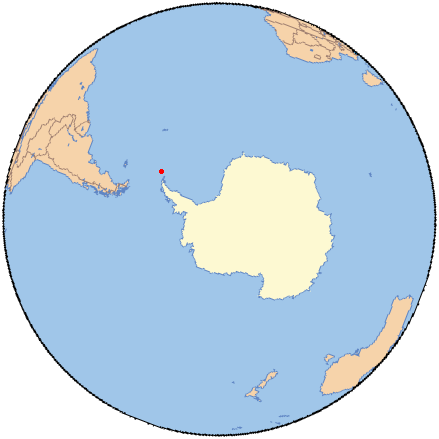
South Orkney Islands.

Norway Bight (60°37′S 45°49′W) is a bay 4 nautical miles (7 km) wide indenting the south coast of Coronation Island between Meier Point and Mansfield Point, in the South Orkney Islands. The name appears on a chart by Petter Sorlle, Norwegian whaling captain who made a running survey of the South Orkney Islands in 1912–13.

Cleft Point is a headland on the east side of Norway Bight.
