= Signy Research Station =

- Antarctic base
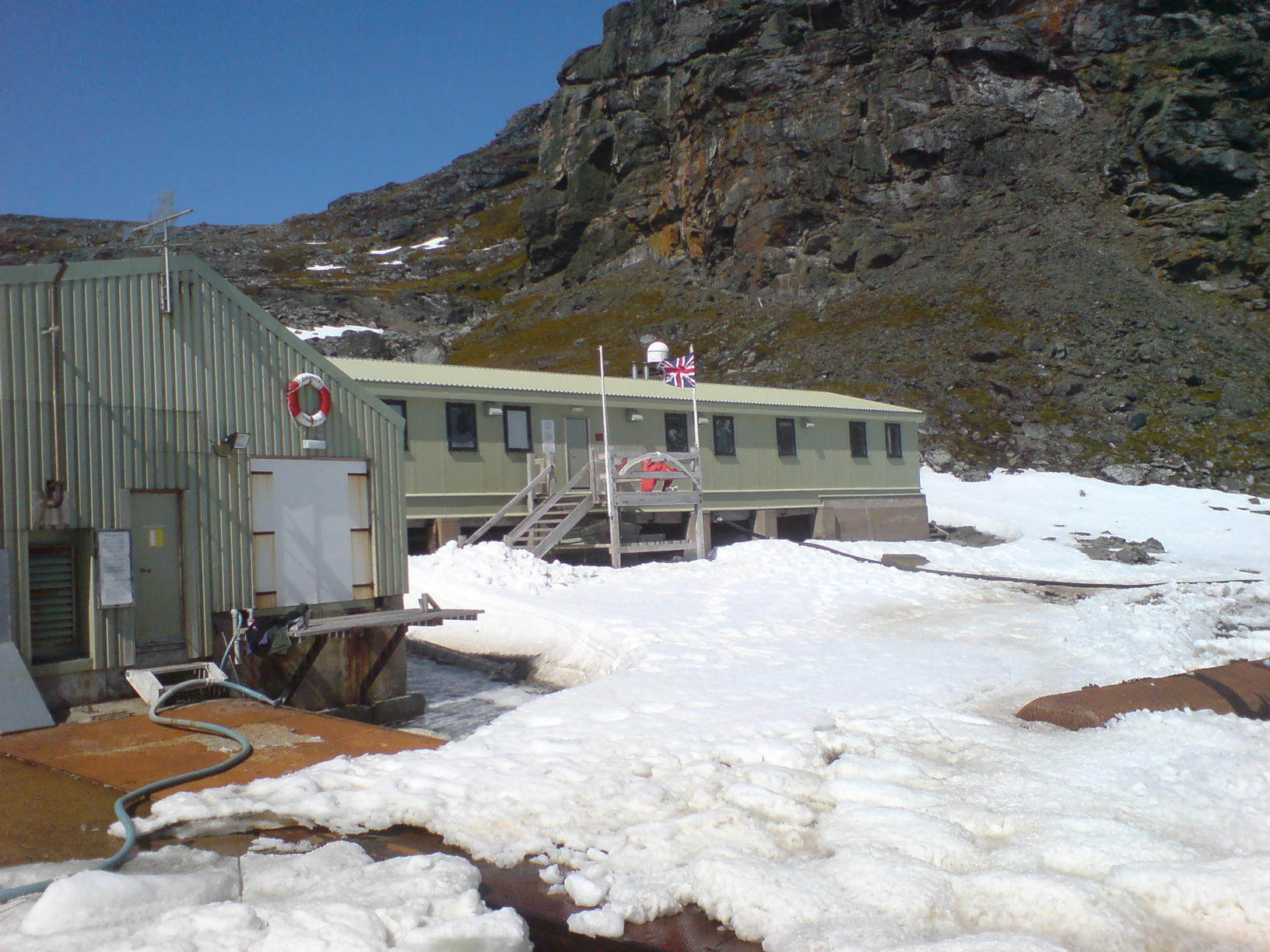
- Signy Research Station in 2006

- Location of Signy Research Station in Antarctica
- Coordinates: 60°42′30″S 45°35′42″W
- Country: United Kingdom
- British Overseas Territory: British Antarctic Territory
- Location in Antarctica: Signy Island
- Administered by: British Antarctic Survey
- Established: 18 March 1947
- Elevation: 16 ft (5 m)

Population (2017)
  - Summer: 14
  - Winter: 0
- UN/LOCODE: AQ SGN
- Type: Seasonal
- Period: Summer
- Status: Operational
- Activities: List: Climatology; Limnology; Microbiology; Sedimentology
- Website: www.antarctica.ac.uk

Signy Research Station (originally Station H) is an Antarctic research base on Signy Island, run by the British Antarctic Survey.

== History ==
Signy was first occupied in 1947 when a three-man meteorological station was established in Factory Cove above the old whaling station. It was the second research base on the South Orkney Islands (after the Argentine Orcadas Base in 1903). In 1955, a new hut, Tønsberg House was built on the site of the whaling station. In 1963, it was turned into a laboratory for biological research. In 1967, transplant experiments with plants led to the introduction of two non-native invertebrates; the flightless midge Eretmoptera murphyi and the enchytraeid worm Christensenidrilus blocki. Initially operated year-round, since 1995/6 the station has been open from November to April each year (southern hemisphere summer).

== Facilities ==
Today, the base has four buildings with capacity for 8 people. The main building, Sørlle House (named after the whaling captain Petter Sørlle, who himself named Signy Island), provides living accommodation and laboratories. The other buildings are for storage and provision of power and water services. There are also four small huts around the island.

A light railway was constructed in 1963 for unloading stores and large items of machinery. When built, this was the southernmost railway in existence. It was later extended up a hill to reach the fuel tanks.

== Research ==
Marine and terrestrial biology is carried out at Signy, particularly looking at the effects of climate change on the southern ocean ecosystems. Three species of penguin (Adélie, chinstrap and gentoo) are monitored at the base.

To continue an original time series of visual sea ice observations after the station became summer-only, an automated sea ice camera now operates all year around, providing a continuous record of sea ice extent near the station for over 50 years.

== Climate ==
Signy Research Station has a tundra climate (ET according to the Köppen climate classification), because all twelve months have a mean temperature under 10 °C (50 °F). Signy Research Station has very long, cold winters (although they are mild for Antarctic standards) and short, cool summers. It has only three months with the average temperature above freezing point. The temperature is consistently cold year-round, with August, the coldest month, having a mean of −10.3 °C (13.5 °F) and an average low of −15.6 °C (3.9 °F). February is the warmest month, with a mean of 3.9 °C (39.0 °F) and an average high of 6.4 °C (43.5 °F). Records were kept for a few years mostly around the late 1980s. The highest temperature ever recorded was 19.8 °C (67.6 °F) on 30 January 1982, which is the highest temperature recorded anywhere south of 60°S, and the lowest recorded temperature was −27.8 °C (−18.0 °F) in June.

Climate data for Signy Research Station, 6 m asl (1971–2000 normals)
| Month | Jan | Feb | Mar | Apr | May | Jun | Jul | Aug | Sep | Oct | Nov | Dec | Year |
|---|---|---|---|---|---|---|---|---|---|---|---|---|---|
| Record high °C (°F) | 19.8 (67.6) | 16.2 (61.2) | 13.3 (55.9) | 4.6 (40.3) | 4.9 (40.8) | 3.9 (39.0) | 7.4 (45.3) | 3.3 (37.9) | 4.7 (40.5) | 6.6 (43.9) | 6.6 (43.9) | 3.6 (38.5) | 19.8 (67.6) |
| Mean daily maximum °C (°F) | 6.1 (43.0) | 6.4 (43.5) | 6.3 (43.3) | 0.7 (33.3) | 0.2 (32.4) | −2.0 (28.4) | −4.6 (23.7) | −5.0 (23.0) | 0.9 (33.6) | 1.1 (34.0) | 2.0 (35.6) | 1.6 (34.9) | 1.1 (34.1) |
| Daily mean °C (°F) | 1.2 (34.2) | 3.9 (39.0) | 3.1 (37.6) | −1.8 (28.8) | −2.1 (28.2) | −6.9 (19.6) | −7.4 (18.7) | −10.3 (13.5) | −2.9 (26.8) | −1.6 (29.1) | −0.8 (30.6) | −0.1 (31.8) | −2.1 (28.2) |
| Mean daily minimum °C (°F) | −0.7 (30.7) | 1.4 (34.5) | −0.2 (31.6) | −4.3 (24.3) | −4.4 (24.1) | −11.7 (10.9) | −10.1 (13.8) | −15.6 (3.9) | −6.6 (20.1) | −4.2 (24.4) | −3.5 (25.7) | −1.9 (28.6) | −5.1 (22.7) |
| Record low °C (°F) | −1.5 (29.3) | 1.0 (33.8) | −4.4 (24.1) | −8.8 (16.2) | −11.8 (10.8) | −27.8 (−18.0) | −27.7 (−17.9) | −25.4 (−13.7) | −13.9 (7.0) | −8.7 (16.3) | −9.0 (15.8) | −3.8 (25.2) | −27.8 (−18.0) |
| Average precipitation mm (inches) | 33.7 (1.33) | — | 72.6 (2.86) | 6.6 (0.26) | 10.3 (0.41) | 2.6 (0.10) | 5.7 (0.22) | 4.7 (0.19) | 140.0 (5.51) | — | — | 14.1 (0.56) | — |
| Average precipitation days (≥ 1 mm) | 11.63 | — | 26.57 | — | 5.17 | — | — | 1.82 | 10.00 | — | — | 5.64 | — |
Source 1: Météo climat stats
Source 2: Météo Climat

== See also ==
- List of Antarctic research stations
- List of Antarctic field camps
- Crime in Antarctica
