= Borge Bay =

Large bay on Signy Island

Borge Bay (60°43′S 45°37′W) is a large, irregularly-shaped bay that dominates the east side of Signy Island, in the South Orkney Islands of Antarctica. It was charted in 1912 by Norwegian whaling captain Petter Sorlle, and named for Captain Hans Borge of the Polynesia, who undertook additional mapping of the bay during the following year. It was charted in more detail in 1927 and 1933 by Discovery Investigations personnel, who named many of its features. It was surveyed further in 1947 by the Falkland Islands Dependencies Survey (FIDS), which named several other features.

== Geography ==
The headland Balin Point marks the north side of the entrance to Borge Bay. It was charted in 1933 and named in association with Balin Rocks. To the south along the coast are Drying Point, Mooring Point, and Knife Point, whose names first appear on a chart based upon the 1927 survey of Borge Bay, possibly reflecting earlier names given by whalers. Berntsen Point forms the south side of Borge Bay. It was charted in 1927 and probably named for Captain Søren Berntsen of the Orwell.

Right in the inner northwestern corner of the bay are the Mirounga Flats, a small partially enclosed tidal area. The area's eastern limit is formed by the Thule Islands; its northern and western limits by Signy Island. The tidal area dries at low water. The flats were roughly surveyed in 1933 by DI personnel, and resurveyed in 1947 by FIDS. The feature was named by the FIDS because elephant seals (Mirounga leonina) are found there in large numbers during their moulting period.

Waterpipe Beach is a flat shingle beach on the west side of Borge Bay. It was named by FIDS in 1947. An old pipe line from a pumping station by Pumphouse Lake, the southernmost lake in Three Lakes Valley, leads down to this beach and was used by the Tonsberg Hvalfangeri for watering whaling vessels between 1920 and 1930. To the southwest are the descriptively-named Marble Knolls, named by UK-APC. The next notable feature is Pup Cove, a small cove named by UK-APC in recognition of the first recorded birth of an Antarctic fur seal pup on the island. South of that is the Elephant Flats, a mud flat along the shore frequented by elephant seals, which UK-APC named the feature for. South of Waterpipe Beach is Cemetery Bay, a shallow southwest arm of Borge Bay, lying immediately below Orwell Glacier. UK-APC named it in association with the whalers' graves on the east side of the feature. Moraine Valley drains north into the Elephant Flats.

Between Knife Point and Berntsen Point is Factory Cove, roughly surveyed by Captain Borge. It was originally named Borge Harbour by Captain Sorlle, but that name was later transferred to the overall bay of which this cove forms a small part. The cove was resurveyed by DI personnel in 1927 and renamed Factory Cove, because the ruins of the whaling factory built in 1920–21 by the Tonsberg Hvalfangeri stand on its southeastern shore. A group of bluffs rising to 120 metres (400 ft) to the south were named Factory Bluffs by UK-APC after the same factory.

=== Offshore ===
There are a number of named rocks and rock groups within Borge Bay. The Balin Rocks are a small group of rocks close south of Balin Point, charted and named by Captain Sorlle and Captain Borge. 0.1 nautical miles (0.2 km) Northeast of Drying Point are a group of rocks called the Billie Rocks. The name "Billie Rock", for the easternmost rock of the group, appeared on the 1927 DI chart, and was later extended to include the entire group. North-northwest of the Billie Rocks is Cam Rock, a low ice-worn rock normally visible even at high water. The 1927 DI chart names it for its supposed resemblance to a cam. Just north of Berntsen Point is the descriptively-named Small Rock, charted and named by DI personnel.
