= Running survey =

Survey made by a vessel while coasting

A running survey is a rough survey made by a vessel while coasting. Bearings to landmarks are taken at intervals as the vessel sails offshore, and are used to fix features on the coast and further inland. Intervening coastal detail is sketched in.

The method was used by James Cook, and subsequently by navigators who sailed under—or were influenced by—him, including George Vancouver, William Bligh and Matthew Flinders.

In land surveying, the term can refer to establishment of a boundary by a combination of distance measurement, using Gunter's chain or similar, and direction, using a magnetic compass or astronomic means. The results obtained by such methods are irreproducible and open to legal challenge.
