= Signy Island =

Island of Antarctica

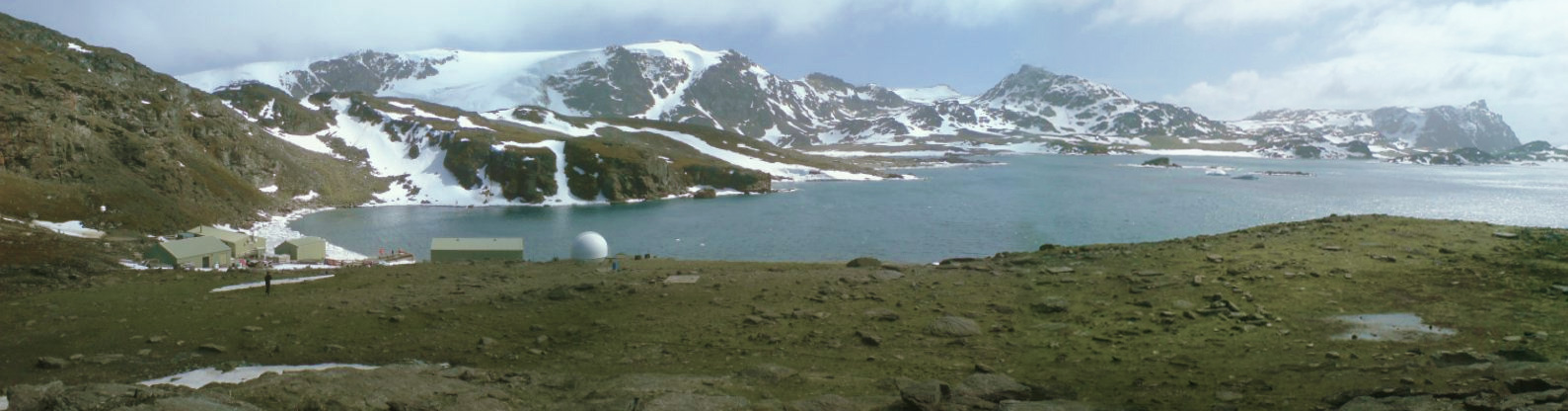
- Signy Island base and panorama

- Location of Signy Island in the South Orkney Islands

- Location within Antarctica

Geography
- Location: Southern Atlantic Ocean
- Coordinates: 60°43′S 45°36′W
- Archipelago: South Orkney Islands
- Total islands: 1
- Area: 19 km^{2} (7.3 sq mi)
- Length: 6.5 km (4.04 mi)
- Width: 5 km (3.1 mi)
- Highest elevation: 288 m (945 ft)

Administration
- Antarctica
- Administered under the Antarctic Treaty System
- Largest settlement: Signy Research Station (pop. 5)

Demographics
- Population: 5
- Pop. density: 0.26/km^{2} (0.67/sq mi)

Signy Island is a small subantarctic island in the South Orkney Islands of Antarctica. It was named by the Norwegian whaler Petter Sørlle (1884–1933) after his wife, Signy Therese.

The island is about 6.5 km (4.0 mi) long and 5 km (3.1 mi) wide and rises to 288 m (945 ft) above sea level. Much of it is permanently covered with ice. The average temperature range is 0 °C (32 °F) to about −10 °C (14 °F) in winter (i.e. in July). The extremes extend to 12 and −44 °C (53.6 and −47.2 °F). The island is separated from Coronation Island to the north by Normanna Strait, and from Moe Island to the southwest by Fyr Channel.

On Signy Island, the British Antarctic Survey (BAS) maintains the Signy Research Station, a scientific station for research in biology. The base was opened on 18 March 1947, on the site of an earlier whaling station that had existed there in the 1920s. The station was staffed year-round until 1996; since that year it has been occupied only from November to April. It houses 10 people.

== Geography ==
A number of locations on the island have been charted and individually named by various Antarctic expeditions. The first survey was conducted in 1912 by Norwegian whaling captain Petter Sørlle. It was subsequently visited and charted by Discovery Investigations (DI) personnel in 1927 and 1933. Finally, in 1947, the Falkland Islands Dependencies Survey (FIDS) charted the island. The charts produced by these surveys account for many of the names of the island's features. Others were provided later by the UK Antarctic Place-Names Committee (UK-APC).

=== West coast ===
The northernmost point of Signy Island is descriptively named North Point, first charted in 1933 by DI personnel. To the southwest, 0.75 nmi (1.4 km) off the coast, are the ice-free Spindrift Rocks, approximately 15 m (49 ft) high. They were surveyed and named in 1947 by FIDS. The name is descriptive of the spindrift, or sea spray, which forms over these rocks during westerly gales. South of North Point is Williams Haven, a cove with a large sea cave in the cliff on the north side of the cove. UK-APC named the cove after David D. Wynn-Williams, BAS microbiologist. The south entrance of Williams Haven is marked by Richard Point, named for Kenneth J. Richard, BAS technician.

Deschampsia Point is a point on the northwest side of Signy Island, 0.3 nautical miles (0.6 km) northeast of the Spindrift Rocks. It was descriptively named by UK-APC in 1991 after the Antarctic hair grass Deschampsia antarctica, which grows on the slopes near the point.

To the south, Lovegrove Point, named by UK-APC for Ian W. Lovegrove, marks the north entrance of Express Cove, a small cove approximately midway down the west coast of the island. Express Cove has a very indented shoreline with numerous offshore islands and rocks. It was roughly charted in 1933 by DI personnel and named for the American schooner Express, which visited the South Orkney Islands in 1880. Foca Point marks the south side of the entrance to Express Cove. It was named for the whale catcher Foca, belonging to the Compañía Argentina de Pesca. Both were surveyed in 1947 by FIDS and named by UK-APC. Foca Point also marks the north side of Foca Cove, named in association with the point.

The next significant feature is Thulla Point, an ice-free point lying 1 nautical mile (1.9 km) northeast of Jebsen Point. It was charted in 1933 by DI personnel, roughly surveyed in 1947 by FIDS, and named by UK-APC in 1954 for the Norwegian steamship Thulla. Thulla Cove, named in association with the point, is located to the south of it.

Inland to the southeast of the point and cove are several lakes, all named by UK-APC. Amos Lake, named for Stephen C. Amos, British Antarctic Survey limnologist, is closest to the shore. Northeast of Amos Lake is Spirogyra Lake, named for the algal genus Spirogyra, which grows abundantly in the lake in summer. To the east is Light Lake, named after BAS limnologist Jeremy J. Light. Tranquil Lake, a cirque lake fed by meltwater, named by UK-APC for its sheltered position, lies further inland between Amos Lake and the Snow Hills.

Port Jebsen indents the coast towards the south end of the island immediately north of Jebsen Point. It was charted in 1912 by Petter Sorlle, a Norwegian whaling captain, who named Jebsen Point, for which the cove is named. Also associated are the Jebsen Rocks, a chain of rocks which extend 0.5 nautical miles (1 km) in an east–west direction, lying 0.5 nautical miles north of Jebsen Point.

South of Jebsen Point is Cummings Cove, surveyed by DI personnel in 1933 and FIDS personnel in 1947. It was named by UK-APC for FIDS radio operator E. T. Cummings. BAS maintains a scientific hut at Cummings Cove, visited regularly by BAS personnel from Signy Station. It has accommodations for 2 people, with food and fuel for 2 person-months. Bothy Lake, a small lake at the cove's head, was named by UK-APC for this hut, or "bothy". Twisted Lake, 0.1 nmi (0.2 km) northeast of Cummings Cove, was named by UK-APC for its irregular shoreline. Porteous Point, charted in 1933 by DI personnel, marks the south entrance point of Cummings Cove.

South of Cummings Cove is Hydrurga Cove, named by UK-APC after the leopard seals, Hydrurga leptonyx, that commonly frequent the cove.

=== East coast ===
The first prominent feature on the east coast is Stygian Cove, named by FIDS because it is so overshadowed by the cliffs of Robin Peak that a sense of stygian gloom is felt. Immediately to the east is Berry Head, named by DI personnel, which divides Stygian Cove from Tern Cove. The entrance of Tern Cove is blocked by submerged rocks. The cove contains three small islands, and an area near the head dries at low water. It was named by FIDS for the colony of Antarctic terns on the southernmost island in the cove. 0.3 nmi (0.6 km) inland to the south of Berry Head is The Wallows, a low-lying area sheltered by low ridges with a small freshwater pond in the center. It was named by FIDS because moulting elephant seals wallow here in the summer.

To the south of that is Rootes Point, named by UK-APC after David M. Rootes of the BAS, which marks the north entrance of Starfish Cove. Starfish Cove was roughly surveyed in 1933 by DI personnel and named by FIDS because of the large number of starfish in the cove. About 0.3 nmi (0.6 km) off the mouth of the cove is a small submerged rock called Powell Rock, first charted by Captain Sorlle and named after his whale catcher Powell.

South of Starfish Cove is Borge Bay, a large, irregularly-shaped bay that dominates the east side of Signy Island, delineated by Balin Point to the north and Berntsen Point to the south.

0.5 nmi (0.9 km) south of Borge Bay is Paal Harbour. The name first appears on a map by captain Sorlle. The harbor and its constituent features were first surveyed in 1933 by DI personnel and resurveyed in 1947 by FIDS. Observation Bluff, 110 m (360 ft) high, forms the north side of Paal Harbor. It was named by FIDS because they made daily observations from it. The bluff comes to a point called Polynesia Point, named by UK-APC after the factory ship Polynesia. Pinder Gully, named by UK-APC for meteorologist Ronald Pinder, runs into the sea from the bluff. On the west side of the harbor is Rusty Bluff, a prominent cliff rising 225 m (738 ft) to a rounded summit, named for its color and a rusted iron post found on the summit by FIDS. Ice-free Rethval Point, named by UK-APC after the Rethval Whaling Company of Oslo, the first company to start whaling in the South Orkney Islands, forms the south side of the entrance to Paal Harbour.

To the south sits Caloplaca Cove, named by UK-APC after the abundant orange lichens of the genus Caloplaca, which encrust the sea cliffs around the cove. The south entrance of the cove is marked by Pantomime Point, on Gourlay Peninsula.

Gourlay Peninsula is an irregularly-shaped ice-free peninsula, which is 0.1 nautical miles (0.2 km) wide at its base and widens to 0.4 nautical miles (0.7 km), forming the southeastern extremity of Signy Island. The seaward end of the peninsula divides into three arms. It was surveyed in 1933 by DI personnel, and resurveyed in 1947 by FIDS. Pantomime Point is the northernmost of the three points, and Pageant Point is the central and highest of the three points. Both were named by FIDS for behavior observed in the penguin rookeries on the peninsula. The cove between Pantomime and Pageant Points is named Filer Haven, named by UK-APC for John Filer, a British Antarctic Survey biologist who fell to his death from the cliffs here in 1961. The third point is Gourlay Point, named by DI personnel after engineer Ronald George Gourlay; the peninsula as a whole was named by UK-APC for the point.

=== South coast ===
Moyes Point is a point on the southwest part of Signy Island, forming the east side of the southeast entrance to Fyr Channel. First charted in 1933 by DI personnel, it was surveyed by FIDS in 1956–58. In 1959 it was named by UK-APC after William Moyes, British government representative at Signy Island in 1912–13.

To the east, the southernmost point of the island is Pandemonium Point, named by FIDS because of the ceaseless noise from the penguin rookeries on the west side of the ridge close north of the point. Clowes Bay is a bay 1 nautical mile (2 km) wide, entered between the Oliphant Islands and Confusion Point on Confusion Island, along the south side of Signy Island. It was charted in 1933 by DI personnel who named it for Archibald J. Clowes, English oceanographer. East of Clowes Bay is Lenton Point, named in 1954 by UK-APC for radio operator Ralph A. Lenton of FIDS. Lenton Point marks the west side of Fur Seal Cove, which sits next to Gourlay Peninsula. The cove was named by the UK-APC for the large number of fur seals which frequent the cove and adjacent shore. Inland to the north of Lenton Point is the Hillier Moss, a wet, level, low-lying area, which has several small pools and extensive moss carpets. It was named by UK-APC for Edward R. Hillier, a BAS medical officer.

=== Other inland features ===
- Andreaea Plateau
- Cryptogam Ridge
- Everson Ridge
- Garnet Hill
- Gneiss Hills
- Jane Col
- Jane Peak
- Jensen Ridge
- Limestone Valley
- McLeod Glacier
- Moraine Valley
- Moss Braes
- Orwell Glacier
- Paternoster Valley
- Robin Peak
- Skua Terrace
- Snow Hills
- Spindrift Col
- Strombus Ridge
- Three Lakes Valley
- Tilbrook Hill
- Tioga Hill
- Tioga Lake
- Usnea Ridge
- Whalers Bluff

== Important Bird Area ==
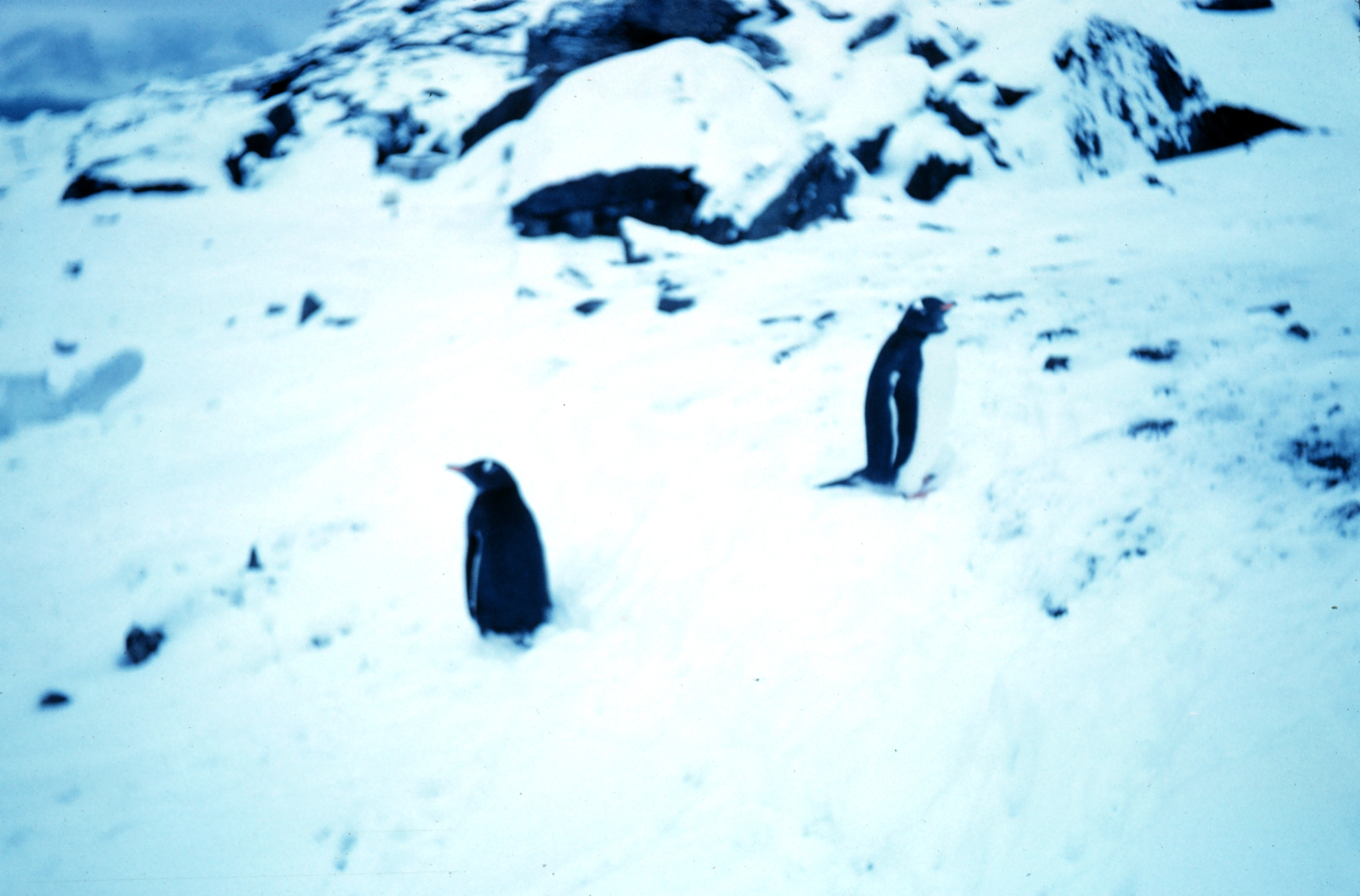
Penguins on Signy Island

The island has been identified as an Important Bird Area (IBA) by BirdLife International because it supports substantial and varied seabird breeding colonies. Birds for which the site is of conservation significance are southern giant petrels (2,300 pairs), Wilson's storm petrels (200,000 pairs), imperial shags (800 pairs) and brown skuas (100 pairs). Other birds nesting on the island include chinstrap penguins (19,500 pairs), Adélie penguin (16,900 pairs), gentoo penguins (750 pairs), Antarctic prions (50,000 pairs), south polar skuas, snow petrels, Cape petrels, black-bellied storm petrels, snowy sheathbills, kelp gulls and Antarctic terns. Antarctic fur seals haul out in large numbers varying up to over 20,000. Weddell seals breed in winter on the sea ice around the island.

Since 1996, the British Antarctic Survey has monitored breeding populations of Adélie, chinstrap and gentoo penguins through counts at selected long-term study colonies on Signy Island.

== See also ==
- List of lighthouses in Antarctica
- List of Antarctic and Subantarctic islands
- Scientific Committee on Antarctic Research
