= Petter Sørlle =

Norwegian whaling captain and inventor (1884–1933)

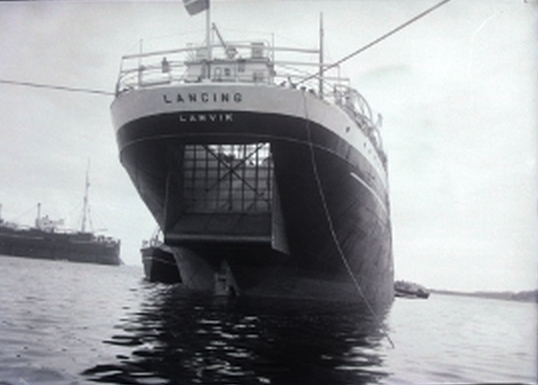
FLK Lancing

Petter Sørlle (February 16, 1884 – May 29, 1933) was a Norwegian whaling captain and inventor.

== Biography ==
Petter Martin Mattias Koch Sørlle was born at Tune (now Sarpsborg) in Østfold, Norway. Both his father and grandfather had been sailors. He was engaged in whaling from Vestfold and later participated in Antarctica whaling near the South Georgia Island and South Orkney Islands.

He invented slipways for whaling ships, which he patented in 1922. His invention was a device by which the whale could be fully drawn to the ship. The pickup slip was first used in the Antarctic Ocean by the whaling company Globus of Larvik on board the FLK Lancing during the season 1925–26.

Sørlle was the first manager of the United Whalers whaling shore station at Stromness, South Georgia. He carried out surveys and is commemorated by several place names in Antarctic waters.

Sørlle Buttress, the Sørlle Rocks and Cape Sørlle are all Antarctic features named after him.

== List of features named by Sørlle ==
During his running surveys, Sørlle named a number of features in the South Orkney Islands, including:

- Gerd Island
- Signy Island
- Reid Island

== See also ==
- Falkland Harbour

== Other sources ==
- Næss, Øyvind (1951) Hvalfangerselskapet Globus A/S 1925–1950 : et kapitel av den moderne hvalfangsts historie (Larvik: Hvalfangerselskapet Globus)
- Tønnessen, Joh N.; Johnsen, Arne Odd (1982). The History of Modern Whaling. (University of California Press). ISBN 0520039734.
