= Coronation Island =

Island of the South Orkney Islands, Antarctica

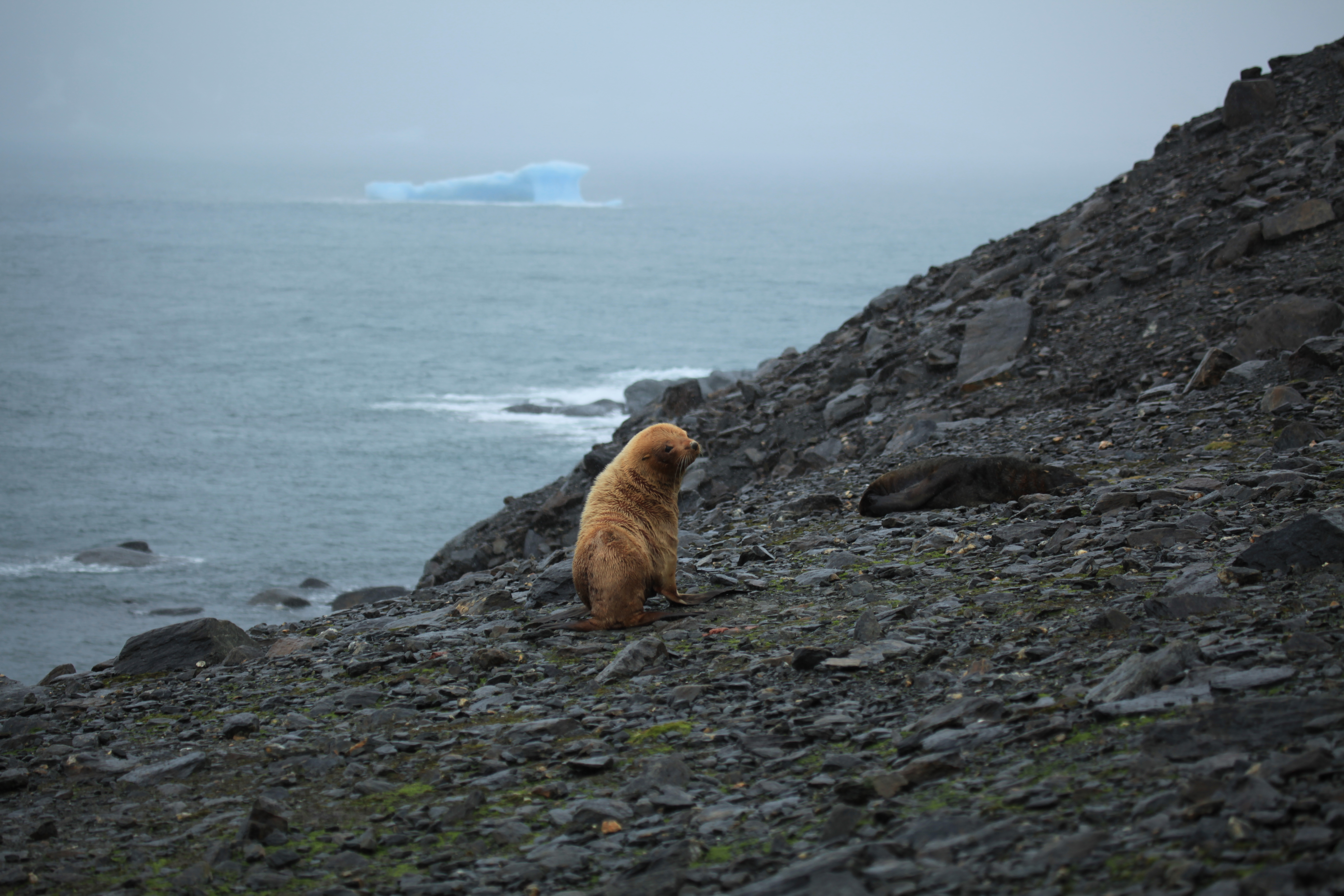
- Leucistic Antarctic fur seal on Coronation Island

- Location of Coronation Island in the South Orkney Islands

- Location within Antarctica

Geography
- Location: Antarctica
- Coordinates: 60°37′S 45°35′W
- Archipelago: South Orkney Islands
- Area: 450 km^{2} (170 sq mi)
- Length: 46 km (28.6 mi)
- Width: 5.6–14.8 km (3.5–9.2 mi)
- Highest elevation: 1,265 m (4150 ft)
- Highest point: Mount Nivea

Administration
- Administered under the Antarctic Treaty System

Demographics
- Population: 0

Coronation Island is the largest of the South Orkney Islands, 25 nautical miles (46 km) long and from 3 to 8 nautical miles (5.6 to 14.8 km) wide. The island extends in a general east–west direction, is mainly ice-covered and comprises numerous bays, glaciers and peaks, the highest rising to 1,265 metres (4,150 ft).

== History ==
The island was discovered in December 1821, in the course of the joint cruise by Captain Nathaniel Palmer, an American sealer, and Captain George Powell, a British sealer. Powell named the island in honour of the coronation of George IV, who had become king of the United Kingdom in 1820.

== Antarctic Specially Protected Area ==
An area of some 92 km^{2} of north-central Coronation Island has been designated an Antarctic Specially Protected Area (ASPA 114), mainly for use as a relatively pristine reference site for use in comparative studies with more heavily impacted sites. It extends northwards from Brisbane Heights and Wave Peak in the central mountains to the coast between Conception Point in the west to Foul Point in the east. Most of the land in the site is covered by glacial ice, with small areas of ice-free terrain along the coast. Birds known to breed within the site include chinstrap penguins, Cape petrels and snow petrels.

== Major features ==
Many geographic features on and around Coronation Island have been charted and named by various exploration and survey groups.

The island's northwest point is called Penguin Point. Several named rock formations are located offshore just west of Penguin Point, including the Melsom Rocks, the Despair Rocks, and Lay-brother Rock.

=== Bays ===
The island's irregular coast is indented by a great number of bays.

- Iceberg Bay indents the south coast between Cape Hansen and Olivine Point.
- Ommanney Bay indents the north coast between Prong Point and Foul Point.
- Sandefjord Bay indents the west coast near Monroe Island.

=== Other features ===
- Cockscomb Buttress
- Endurance Ridge
- Norway Bight
- Parpen Crags
- Purdy Point
- Rime Crests
- Shingle Cove

== See also ==
- List of Antarctic and subantarctic islands
- Tønsberg Cove
