= South Orkney Islands =

Group of islands in the Southern Ocean north-east of the Antarctic Peninsula

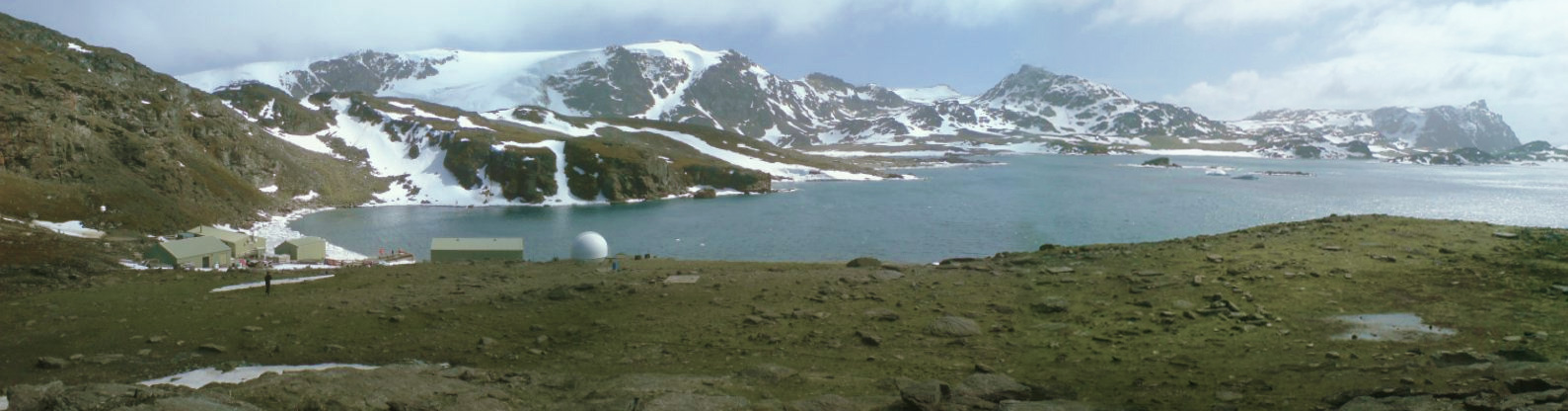
- Signy Island base and panorama

- Map of the South Orkney Islands

Geography
- Coordinates: 60°36′S 45°30′W
- Area: 620 km^{2} (240 sq mi)
- Highest elevation: 4,153 ft (1265.8 m)

Administration
- Administered under the Antarctic Treaty System

Demographics
- Population: approx. 53-55 (summer) 14 (winter)

The South Orkney Islands are a group of islands in the Southern Ocean, about 604 km (375 mi) north-east of the tip of the Antarctic Peninsula and 844 km (524 mi) south-west of South Georgia Island. They have a total area of about 620 km^{2} (240 sq mi). The islands are claimed both by Britain (as part of the British Antarctic Territory since 1962, previously as a Falkland Islands Dependency) and by Argentina (as part of Argentine Antarctica). Under the 1959 Antarctic Treaty, sovereignty claims are held in abeyance.

The South Orkney Islands are a group of islands in the Southern Ocean, about 604 km (375 mi) north-east of the tip of the Antarctic Peninsula.

Britain and Argentina both maintain bases on the islands. The Argentine base, Orcadas, established in 1904, is sited on Laurie Island. The 11 buildings of the Argentine station house up to 45 people during the summer, and an average of 14 during winter. The British Antarctic Survey base, Signy Research Station, is located on Signy Island and was established in 1947. Initially operated year-round, since 1995–1996 the Signy Research Station has been open only from November to April each year.

Apart from personnel at the bases, there are no permanent human inhabitants on the islands.

== History ==
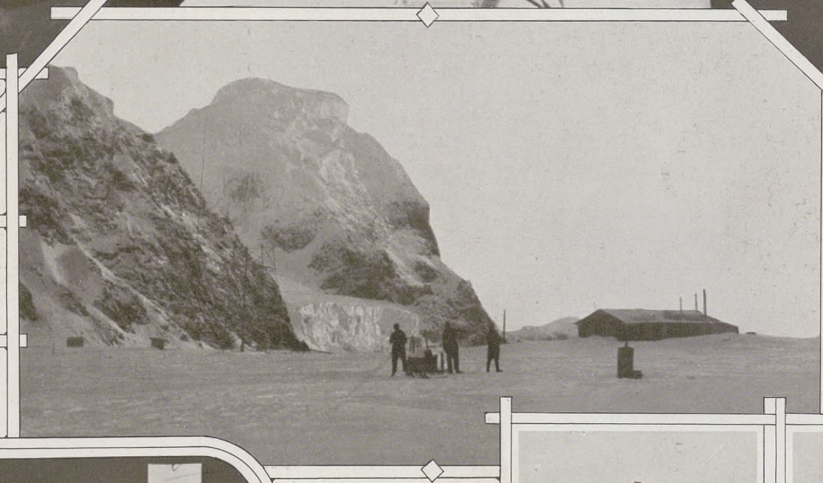
The Argentine Base Orcadas in 1929.

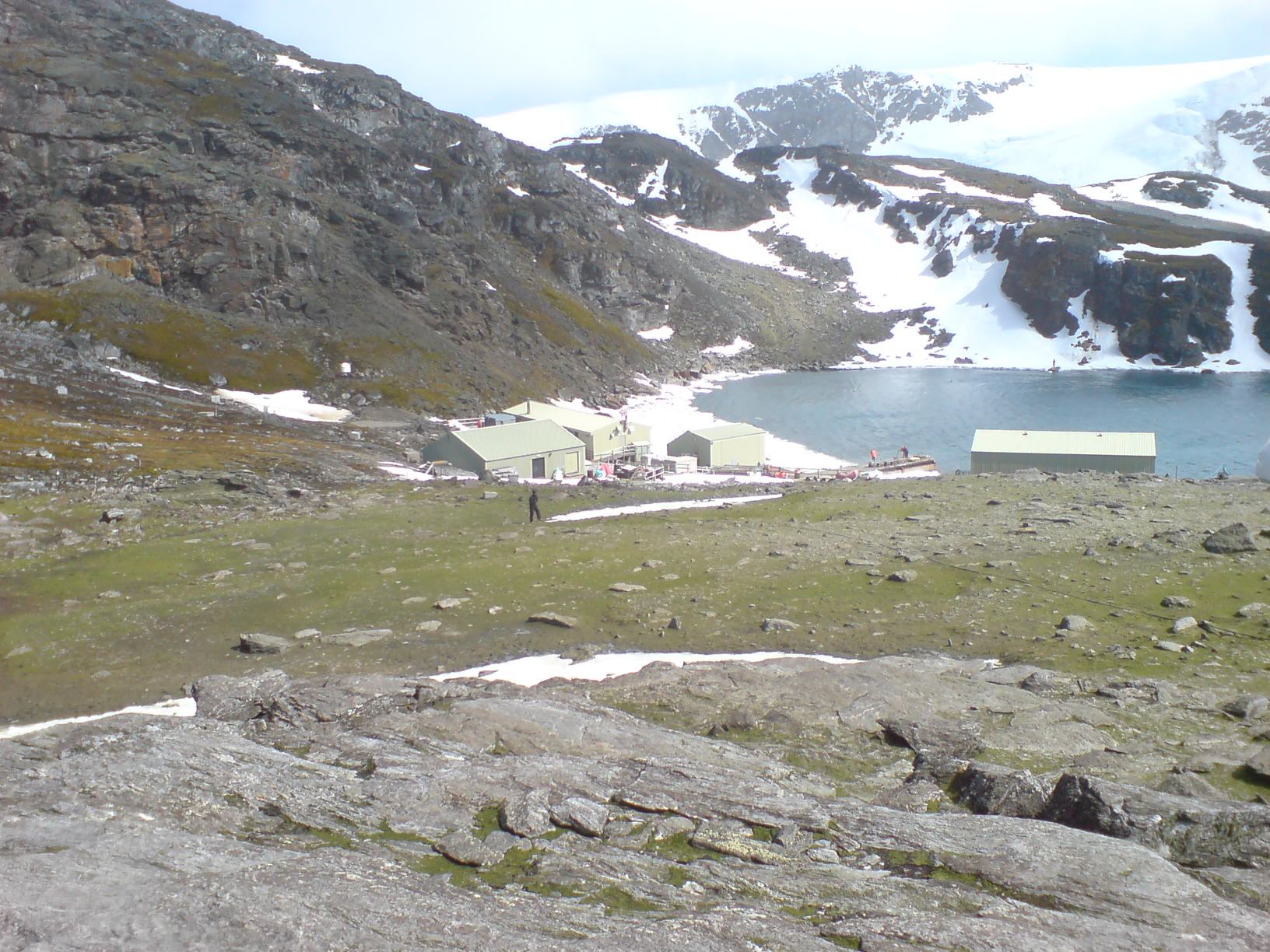
The British Signy Research Station on Signy Island

The South Orkney Islands were discovered in 1821 by two sealers, the American Nathaniel Brown Palmer and the Briton George Powell. The islands were originally named Powell's Group, with the main island named Coronation Island as it was the year of the coronation of King George IV. In 1823, James Weddell visited the islands, gave the archipelago its present name (after the Orkney Islands in the north of Scotland) and also renamed some of the islands. The South Orkney Islands are located at roughly the same latitude south as the Orkney Islands are north (60°S vs 59°N), although it is not known if this was a factor behind the naming of the islands. (Similarly, the South Shetland Islands, discovered in 1819 by William Smith, are roughly the same latitude south as the Shetland Islands are north: 62°S vs 60°N.)

Subsequently, the South Orkney Islands were frequently visited by sealers and whalers, but no thorough survey was done until the expedition of William Speirs Bruce on the Scotia in 1903, which overwintered at Laurie Island. Bruce surveyed the islands, reverted some of Weddell's name changes, and established a meteorological station, which was sold to the Argentine Government upon his departure in 1904. This base, renamed Orcadas in 1951, is still in operation today and is thus the oldest research station continuously staffed in the Antarctic.

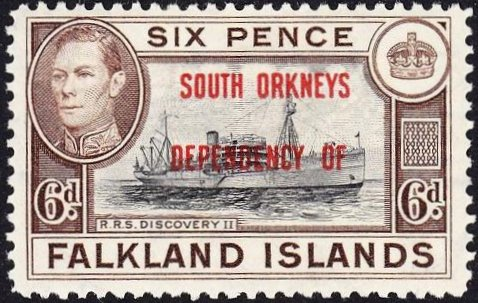
A 1944 stamp of the Falkland Islands overprinted for use in the South Orkneys.

In 1908, the United Kingdom declared sovereignty over various Antarctic and South American territories "to the south of the 50th parallel of south latitude, and lying between the 20th and the 80th degrees of west longitude", including the South Orkney Islands. The Islands were subsequently administered as part of the Falkland Islands Dependencies. A biological research station on Signy Island was built in 1947 by the British Antarctic Survey, and was staffed year-round until 1996, when the Station staffing was reduced to 8–10 personnel who remained only during the southern hemisphere summer (November to April each year). In 1962, the islands became part of the newly established British Antarctic Territory.

The Argentine claim to the islands dates from 1925. It was originally justified by the Argentine occupation of the Laurie Island base and later subsumed into a wider territorial claim.

== Geography and climate ==
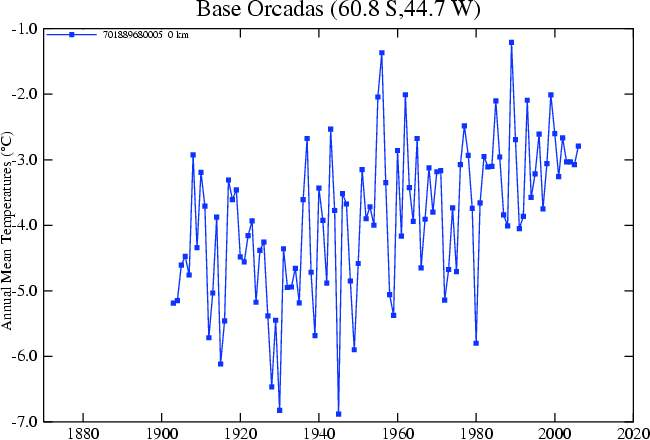
Average air temperature readings of 1901 to 2007; NASA.

The islands are situated at latitudes about 60°30' to 60°48' S and longitudes 44°25' to 46°43' W in the Southern Ocean. As a group of islands, the South Orkney Islands are at approximately 60°36′S 45°30′W.

The archipelago comprises four main islands. Coronation Island is the largest, measuring about 30 mi (48 km) long; its highest point is Mount Nivea which rises to 4,153 ft (1,266 m) above sea level. Laurie Island is the easternmost of the islands. The other main islands are Powell and Signy. Smaller islands in the group include Robertson Islands, the Saddle Islands, and Acuña Island. The total area of the archipelago is about 240 sq mi (620 km^{2}), of which about 90 percent is glaciated.

The Inaccessible Islands about 15 nmi (17 mi; 28 km) to the west are considered part of the South Orkneys.

The climate of the South Orkneys is generally cold, wet, and windy. Summers are short and cold (December to March) when the average temperatures reach about 3.5 °C (38.3 °F) and fall to about −12.8 °C (9 °F) in July. The recorded temperature at Orcadas Base ranges between 12 and −44 °C (53.6 and −47.2 °F). The highest temperature recorded at Signy Research Station was 19.8 °C (67.6 °F) on 30 January 1982, which is the highest temperature recorded anywhere south of 60°S. The seas around the islands are ice-covered from late April to November.

South Orkney Trough (60°0′S 45°0′W) is an undersea trough named in association with the South Orkney Islands.

=== Climate data ===
Two stations are located on the islands. Data is sparse for Signy.

Climate data for Orcadas Base (Köppen ET) (1991−2020 normals, extremes 1903−present)
Month	Jan	Feb	Mar	Apr	May	Jun	Jul	Aug	Sep	Oct	Nov	Dec	Year
Record high °C (°F)	12.0 (53.6)	12.3 (54.1)	10.9 (51.6)	12.6 (54.7)	8.8 (47.8)	9.8 (49.6)	10.0 (50.0)	9.0 (48.2)	10.5 (50.9)	9.6 (49.3)	12.6 (54.7)	11.6 (52.9)	12.6 (54.7)
Mean daily maximum °C (°F)	3.6 (38.5)	3.4 (38.1)	2.4 (36.3)	0.4 (32.7)	−2.0 (28.4)	−3.9 (25.0)	−5.3 (22.5)	−4.1 (24.6)	−2.0 (28.4)	0.6 (33.1)	2.5 (36.5)	3.0 (37.4)	−0.1 (31.8)
Daily mean °C (°F)	1.3 (34.3)	1.4 (34.5)	0.3 (32.5)	−1.8 (28.8)	−5.0 (23.0)	−7.5 (18.5)	−9.4 (15.1)	−8.1 (17.4)	−5.6 (21.9)	−2.7 (27.1)	−0.6 (30.9)	0.5 (32.9)	−3.1 (26.4)
Mean daily minimum °C (°F)	−0.7 (30.7)	−0.4 (31.3)	−1.6 (29.1)	−4.1 (24.6)	−8.1 (17.4)	−11.3 (11.7)	−14.1 (6.6)	−12.4 (9.7)	−9.8 (14.4)	−6.0 (21.2)	−3.2 (26.2)	−1.7 (28.9)	−6.1 (21.0)
Record low °C (°F)	−7.7 (18.1)	−7.9 (17.8)	−14.4 (6.1)	−24.0 (−11.2)	−30.2 (−22.4)	−39.8 (−39.6)	−36.0 (−32.8)	−44.0 (−47.2)	−30.8 (−23.4)	−27.6 (−17.7)	−16.7 (1.9)	−8.7 (16.3)	−44.0 (−47.2)
Average precipitation mm (inches)	43.9 (1.73)	73.5 (2.89)	73.0 (2.87)	73.4 (2.89)	62.6 (2.46)	52.1 (2.05)	44.8 (1.76)	51.6 (2.03)	48.0 (1.89)	48.2 (1.90)	44.7 (1.76)	46.4 (1.83)	662.2 (26.07)
Average precipitation days (≥ 0.1 mm)	18	20	21	20	20	18	17	18	19	20	19	18	228
Average snowy days	15.6	12.9	16.8	18.6	19.2	20.5	18.9	19.8	19.5	21.5	19.0	19.8	221.9
Average relative humidity (%)	85	86	86	86	85	85	83	84	84	86	86	86	86
Mean monthly sunshine hours	49.6	36.8	34.1	24.0	12.4	3.0	6.2	31.0	45.0	52.7	60.0	58.9	413.7
Mean daily sunshine hours	1.6	1.3	1.1	0.8	0.4	0.1	0.2	1.0	1.5	1.7	2.0	1.9	1.1
Percentage possible sunshine	9.3	9.8	9.9	10.1	10.8	15.2	13.2	22.5	21.8	17.6	11.2	12.0	13.5
Source 1: Servicio Meteorológico Nacional (temperature/snowy days/sun 1991–2020, precipitation days 1961–1990, humidity/percent sunshine 1903–1950)
Source 2: NOAA (precipitation 1961–1990), Meteo Climat (record highs and lows)

Climate data for Signy Research Station (Köppen ET) (1971–2000 normals)
Month	Jan	Feb	Mar	Apr	May	Jun	Jul	Aug	Sep	Oct	Nov	Dec	Year
Record high °C (°F)	19.8 (67.6)	16.2 (61.2)	13.3 (55.9)	4.6 (40.3)	4.9 (40.8)	3.9 (39.0)	7.4 (45.3)	3.3 (37.9)	4.7 (40.5)	6.6 (43.9)	6.6 (43.9)	3.6 (38.5)	19.8 (67.6)
Mean daily maximum °C (°F)	6.1 (43.0)	6.4 (43.5)	6.3 (43.3)	0.7 (33.3)	0.2 (32.4)	−2.0 (28.4)	−4.6 (23.7)	−5.0 (23.0)	0.9 (33.6)	1.1 (34.0)	2.0 (35.6)	1.6 (34.9)	1.1 (34.1)
Daily mean °C (°F)	1.2 (34.2)	3.9 (39.0)	3.1 (37.6)	−1.8 (28.8)	−2.1 (28.2)	−6.9 (19.6)	−7.4 (18.7)	−10.3 (13.5)	−2.9 (26.8)	−1.6 (29.1)	−0.8 (30.6)	−0.1 (31.8)	−2.1 (28.2)
Mean daily minimum °C (°F)	−0.7 (30.7)	1.4 (34.5)	−0.2 (31.6)	−4.3 (24.3)	−4.4 (24.1)	−11.7 (10.9)	−10.1 (13.8)	−15.6 (3.9)	−6.6 (20.1)	−4.2 (24.4)	−3.5 (25.7)	−1.9 (28.6)	−5.1 (22.7)
Record low °C (°F)	−1.5 (29.3)	1.0 (33.8)	−4.4 (24.1)	−8.8 (16.2)	−11.8 (10.8)	−27.8 (−18.0)	−27.7 (−17.9)	−25.4 (−13.7)	−13.9 (7.0)	−8.7 (16.3)	−9.0 (15.8)	−3.8 (25.2)	−27.8 (−18.0)
Average precipitation mm (inches)	33.7 (1.33)	—	72.6 (2.86)	6.6 (0.26)	10.3 (0.41)	2.6 (0.10)	5.7 (0.22)	4.7 (0.19)	140.0 (5.51)	—	—	14.1 (0.56)	—
Average precipitation days (≥ 1 mm)	11.63	—	26.57	—	5.17	—	—	1.82	10.00	—	—	5.64	—
Source 1: Météo climat stats
Source 2: Météo Climat

== Flora and fauna ==
Despite the harsh conditions, the islands do support vegetation and constitute the South Orkney Islands tundra ecoregion. All islands lie in the cold seas below the Antarctic Convergence. These areas support tundra vegetation consisting of mosses, lichens and algae, while seabirds, penguins and seals feed in the surrounding waters.

The littoral zone of the South Orkneys is either lifeless or very biologically poor. Amphipods and planarians exist under rocks, along with various algae, chitons, and some gastropods. With increasing water depth, life becomes more varied: starfish appear beyond 2–3 metres, along with sponges, urchins, and ascidians. At 8–10 metres, the variety of starfish increases along with the general biomass, and below 30 metres there are vast colonies of these creatures. Two penguin species, chinstrap (Pygoscelis antarctica) and Adélie (Pygoscelis adeliae), are present on land.

On Signy Island a parthenogenetic flightless midge originally from South Georgia, Eretmoptera murphyi, was accidentally introduced during a botany experiment in the 1960s. It has since colonized much of the island and is altering the soil ecosystem. Some places can reach 20,000 individuals per m^{2}. Because it can survive in water, there are concerns that it could reach other islands.

== Research stations ==
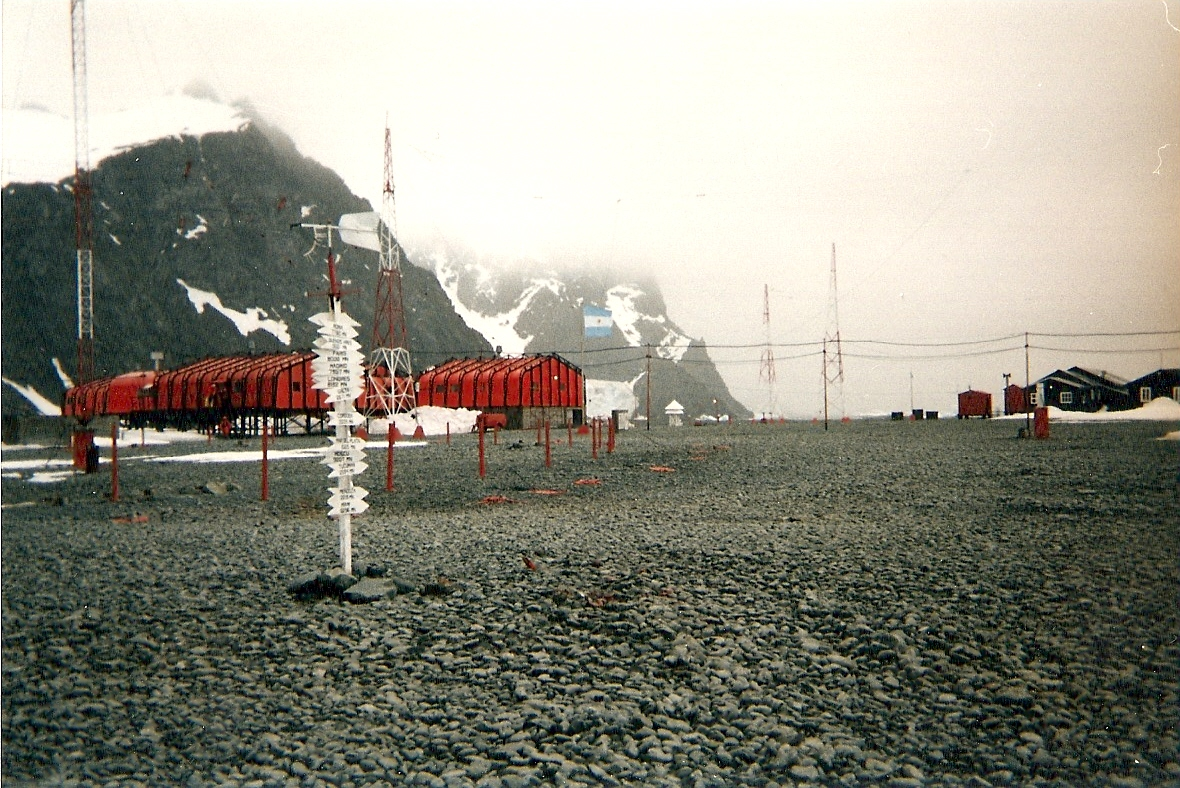
Orcadas Base

The two claimant nations maintain research stations on the islands.

- Argentina Orcadas Base, Laurie Island (since 1904 – bought as a meteorological station from British scientist William Speirs Bruce in 1904)
- United Kingdom Signy Research Station, Signy Island (since 1947)

== See also ==
- Brisbane Heights
- Composite Gazetteer of Antarctica – Authoritative international gazetteer containing all the Antarctic toponyms
- Falkland Harbour
- Iceberg Bay – Bay of Antarctica
- List of Antarctic and subantarctic islands
- Lynch Island – Island in the South Orkney Islands, Antarctica
- Marshall Bay – Bay in Antarctica
- Moe Island – Island of Antarctica
- Monk Islands
- Norway Bight
- Orwell Bight – Bay in the South Orkney Islands
- Scientific Committee on Antarctic Research (SCAR) – British organization
- Scotia Arc – Island arc system in the Southern Ocean
- Scotia Sea – Sea in the Southern Ocean
- Shagnasty Island
- Wave Peak – Mountain in the South Orkney Islands
- Signy Island – Island of Antarctica
- Spindrift Col – Mountain pass on Signy Island in the South Orkney Islands
