= Capt. Nathaniel B. Palmer House =

Historic house in Connecticut, United States

- Captain Nathaniel B. Palmer House
- U.S. National Register of Historic Places
- U.S. National Historic Landmark
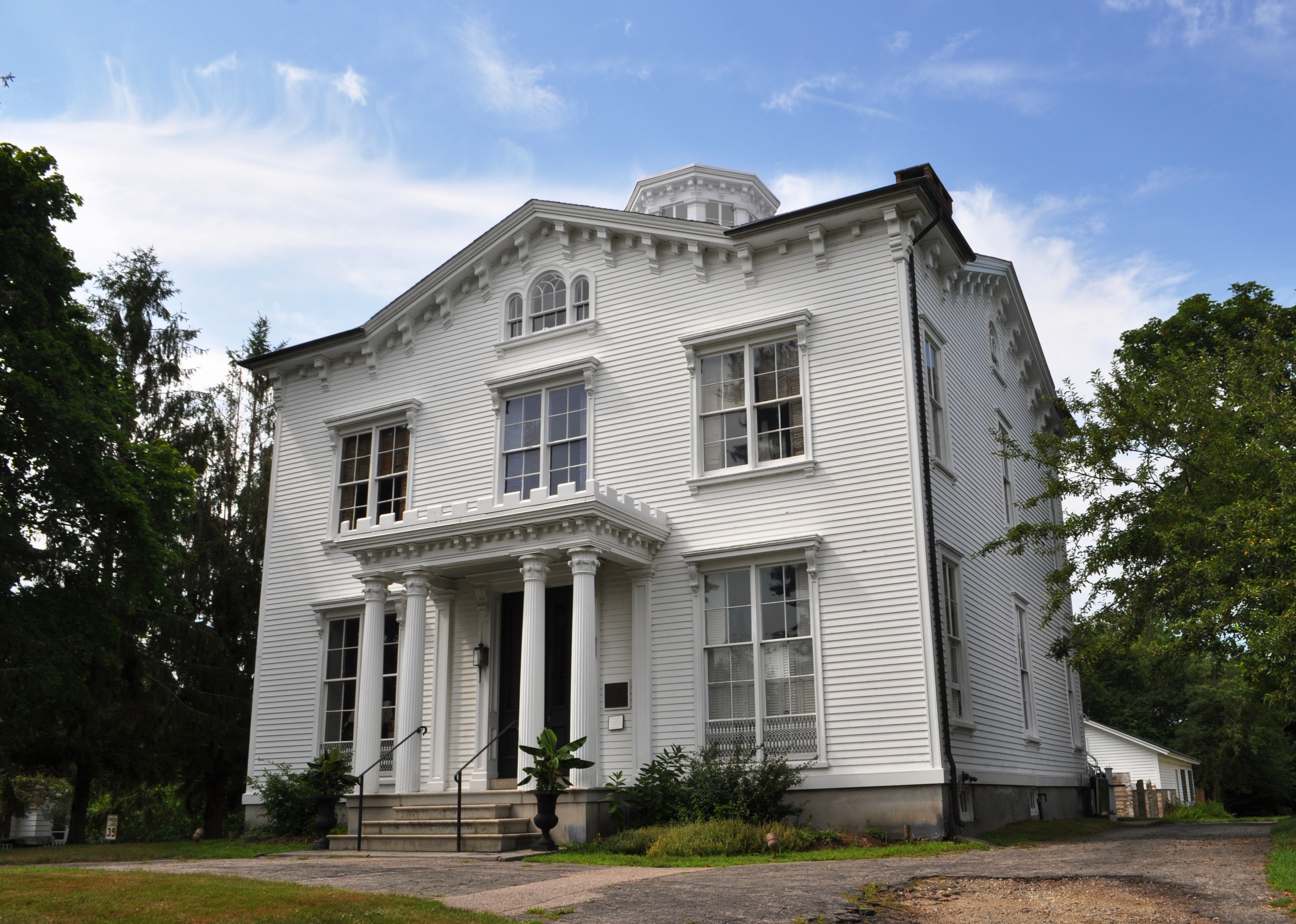

- Location within Connecticut Location within the United States
- Location: 40 Palmer Street, Stonington, Connecticut
- Coordinates: 41°20′34.5″N 71°54′28.15″W
- Built: 1852
- Architect: Collins & Sons
- Architectural style: Italianate
- NRHP reference No.: 96000971

Significant dates
- Added to NRHP: June 19, 1996
- Designated NHL: June 19, 1996

The Capt. Nathaniel B. Palmer House is a historic house museum in Stonington, Connecticut, built in 1852–54. The house is a transitional style between the Greek Revival and the Victorian Italianate. It was built for Nathaniel Brown Palmer (1799–1877), who was a seal hunter, a pioneering Antarctic explorer, and a major designer of clipper ships. Threatened with demolition, it was acquired by the Stonington Historical Society in 1995, which operates it as a museum devoted to Palmer. The house was declared a National Historic Landmark in 1996.

== Description and history ==
The Palmer House is set on a point of land separating Quanaduck Cove from Lamberts Cove to the north of Stonington Borough, the township's coastal village. It occupies a 4-acre (1.6 ha) plot of land, all that is left of extensive Palmer family holdings. It is a roughly square wood-frame structure, three bays wide and 2 1/2 stories in height, with a kitchen ell. The roof is hipped, with a gable at the center of each facade. At the center of the roof is an octagonal cupola with windows providing a 360-degree view. The main entrance is sheltered by a flat-roof portico supported by pairs of fluted and tapered Corinthian columns, with paired paneled pilasters flanking the double door. The windows on the main facade are framed by molded cornices with consoles. Roof lines of the main roof, portico, and cupola have dentil-like consoles and brackets. The interior of the house follows a central hall plan, with four rooms on each floor. The public rooms have particularly well-executed plaster, woodwork, and marble decoration. Of particular note is the captain's study on the ground floor, which features built-in cabinetry with shelving for nautical charts with mahogany-veneered paneled doors.

The house was built for Nathaniel Palmer and his brother Alexander in 1852, and was Palmer's home until his death in 1877. He died childless, and left the property to his niece and nephew-in-law; it remained in the hands of their descendants until 1976. The house was threatened with demolition in the early 1990s, and was purchased by the Stonington Historical Society in 1995.

Nathaniel Palmer was born into a seafaring family, and made his first voyage at the age of 14. Stonington was a center of the seal-hunting trade, which Palmer was drawn to in 1819. In the following year he was assigned to captain a small sloop (about half the size of Christopher Columbus' ship the Niña) which served as the tender and exploratory vanguard of a fleet of seven larger sealers. During an ocean voyage covering about 100,000 nautical miles (190,000 km; 120,000 mi), Palmer on November 17, 1820, sighted the Antarctic Peninsula, and area that came to be called Palmer Land. Palmer's role in the discovery is further commemorated in the name of the American research station, Palmer Station. In his later years Palmer engaged in the design of faster sailing vessels, designing a prototypical clipper ship in 1843 while on a trading journey to China. Built the following year, the Houqua made the journey from New York City to Canton, China in a record 95 days.

== Gallery ==
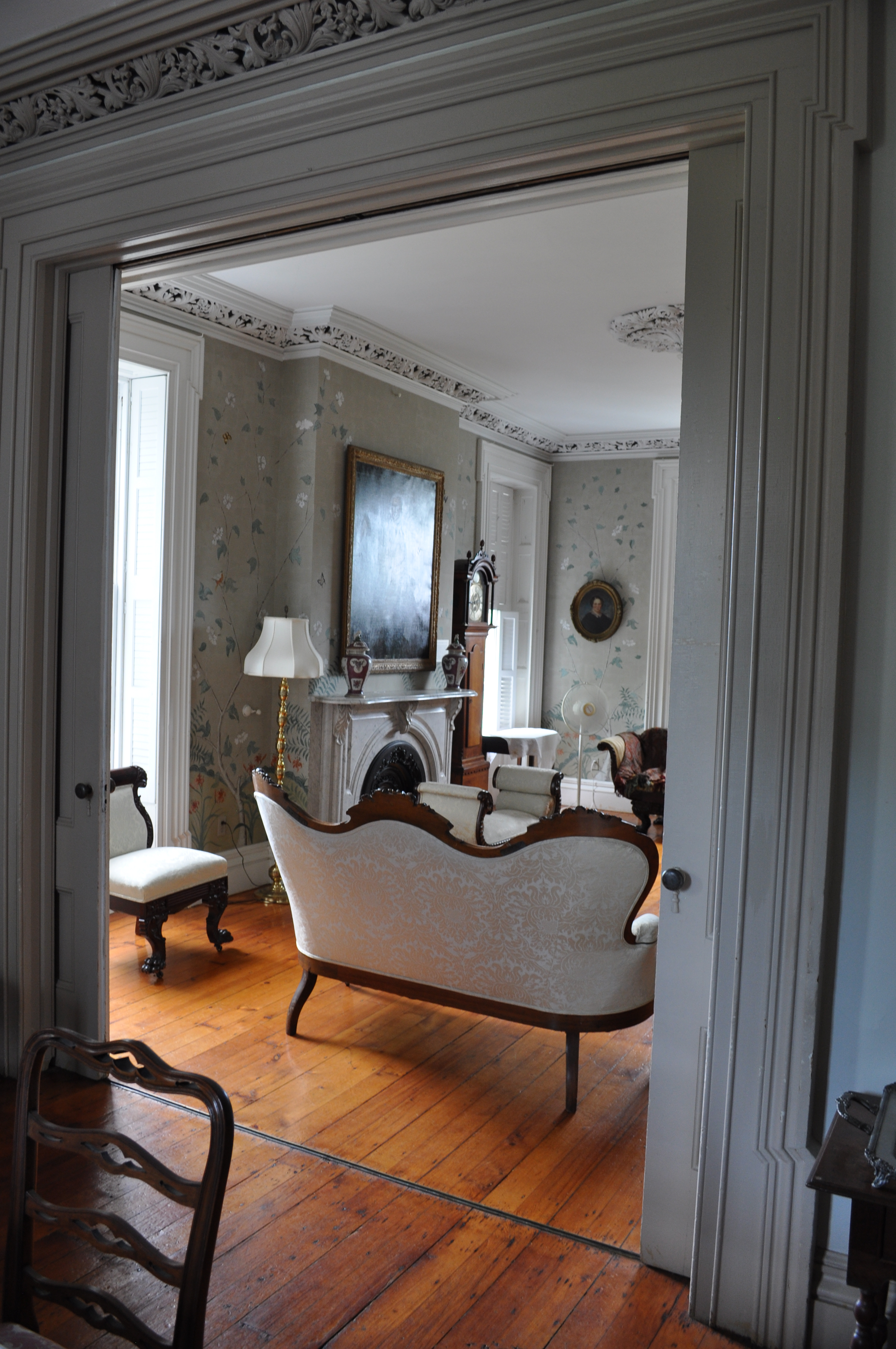
One of the downstairs rooms of the house

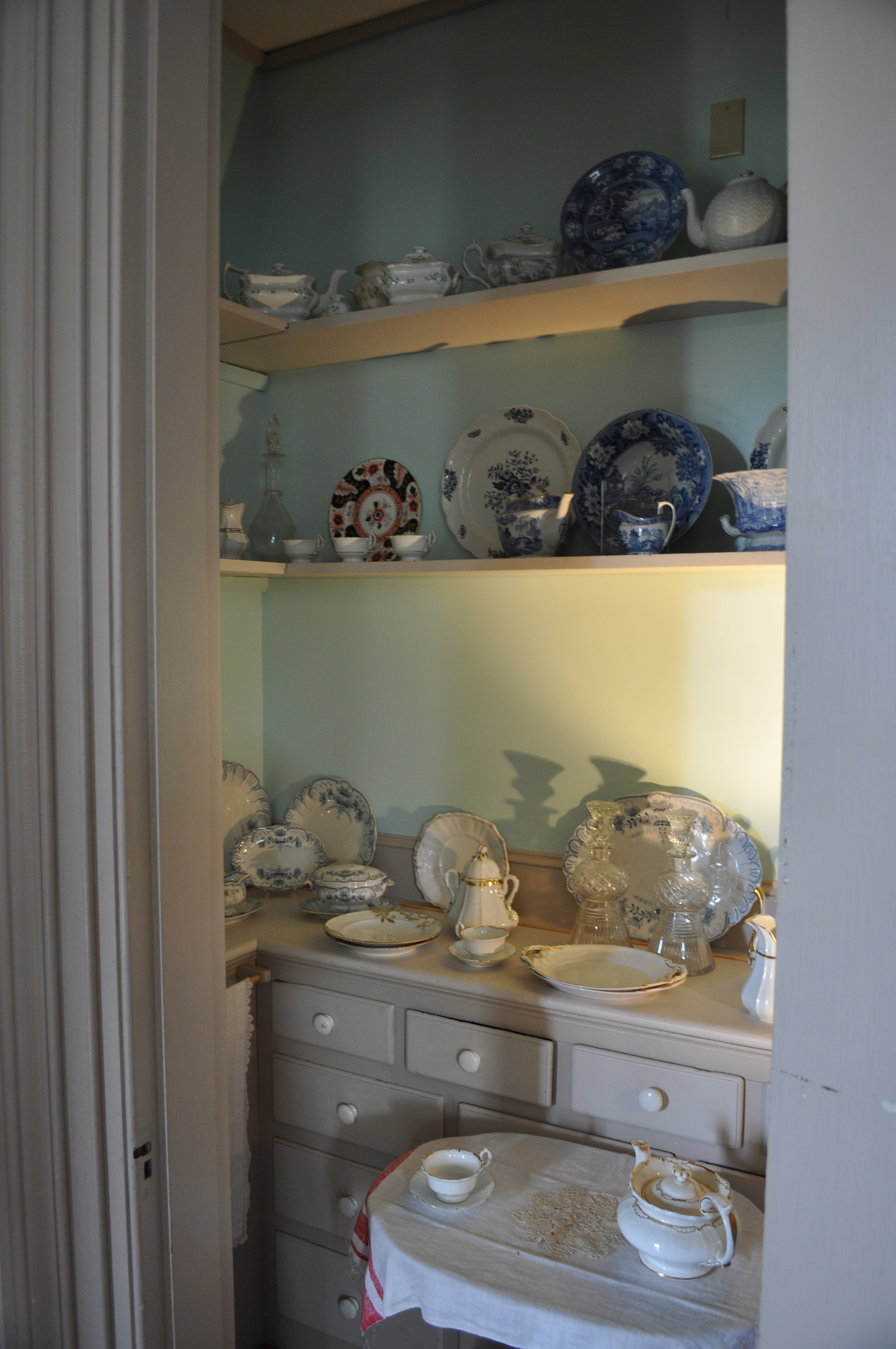
A downstairs china closet

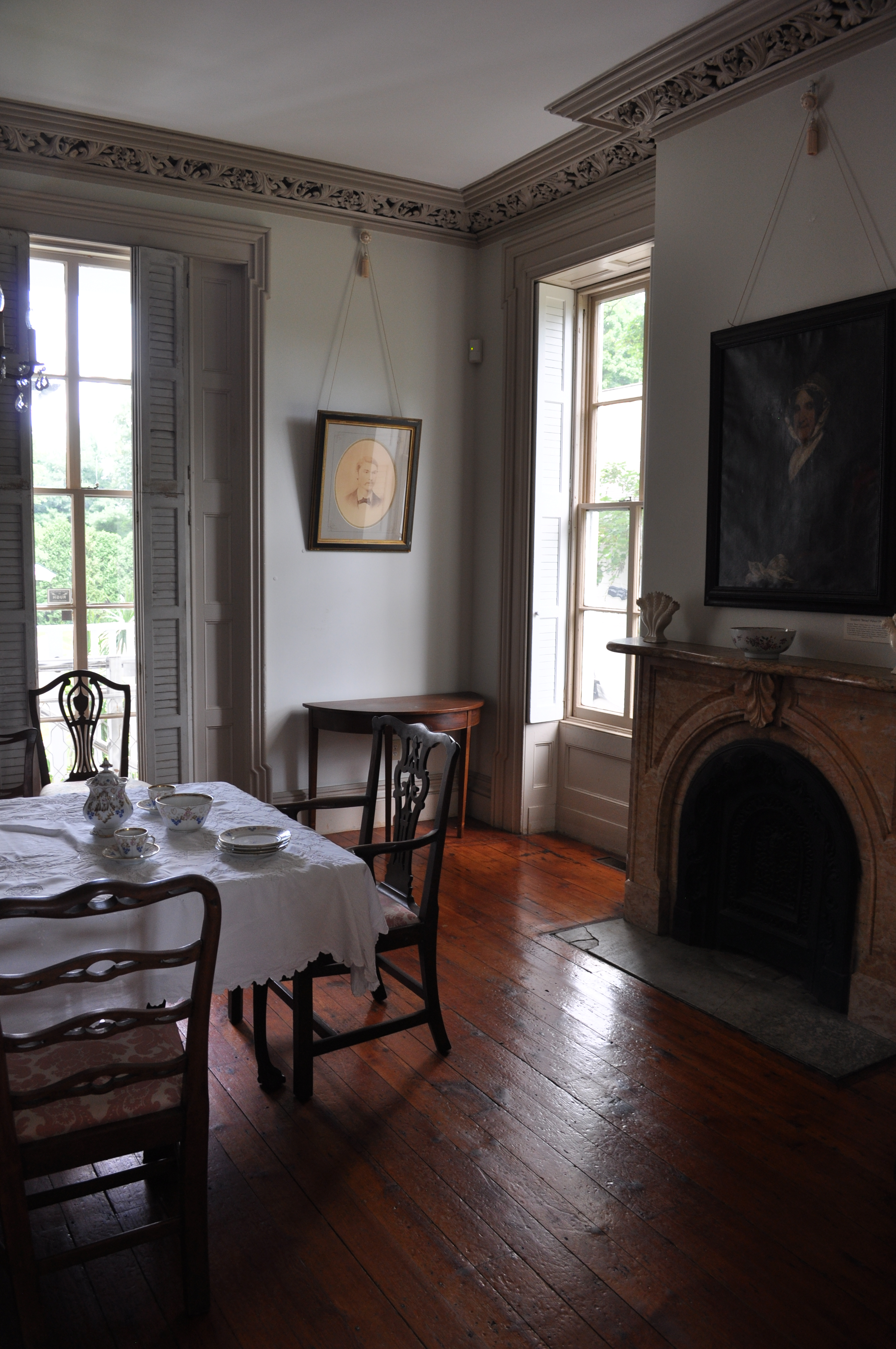
A downstairs room

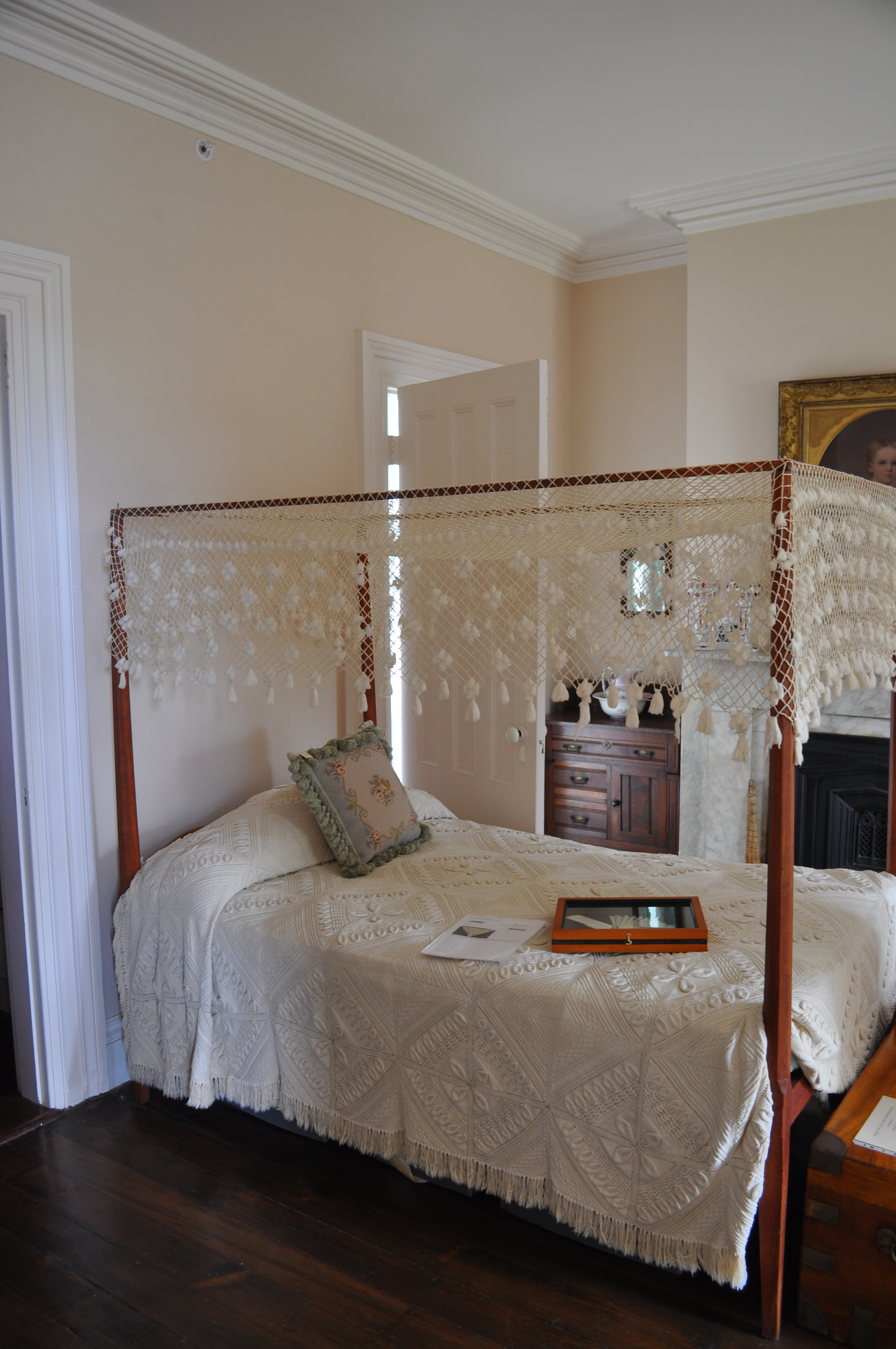
An upstairs room

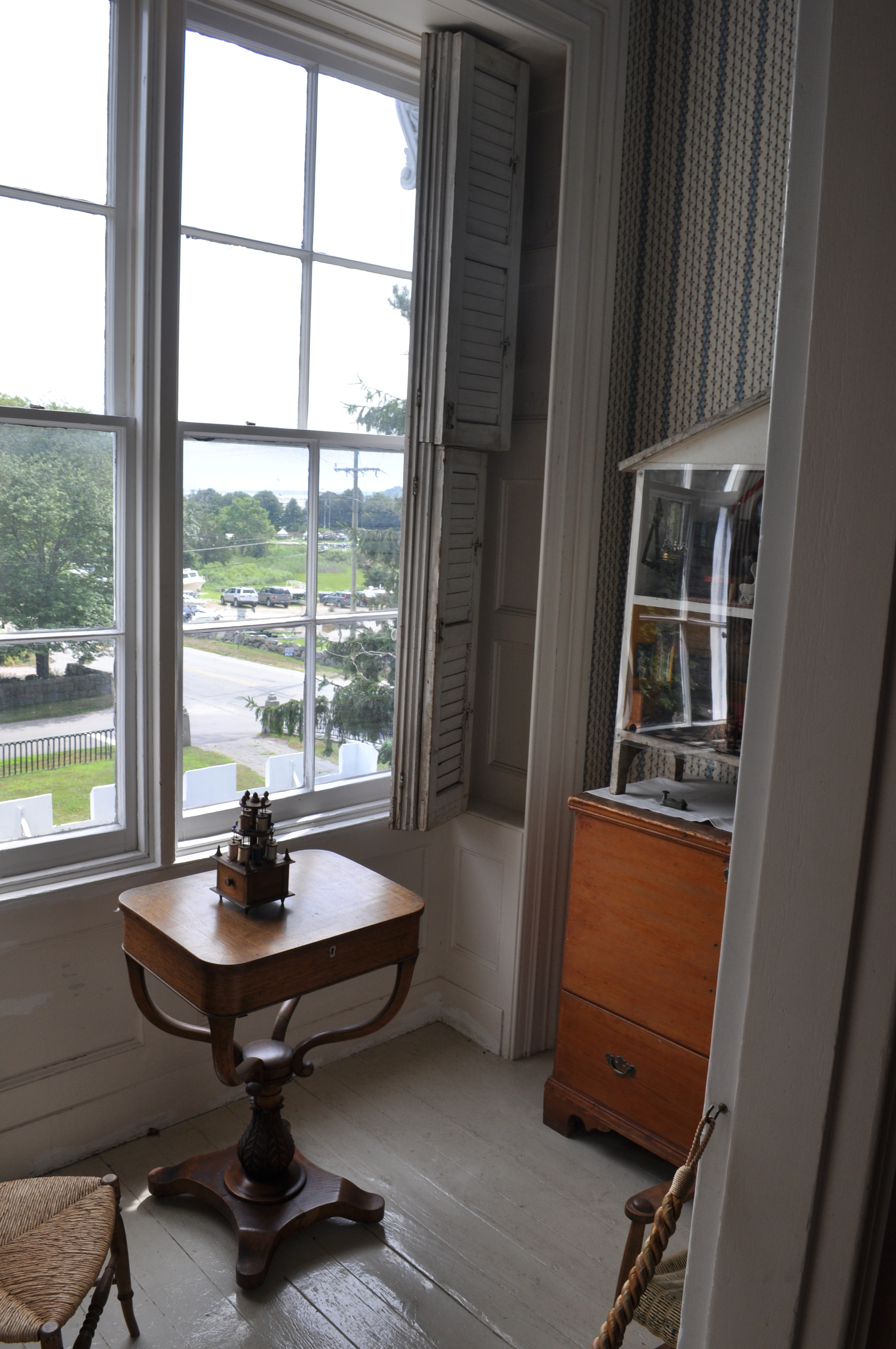
An upstairs room

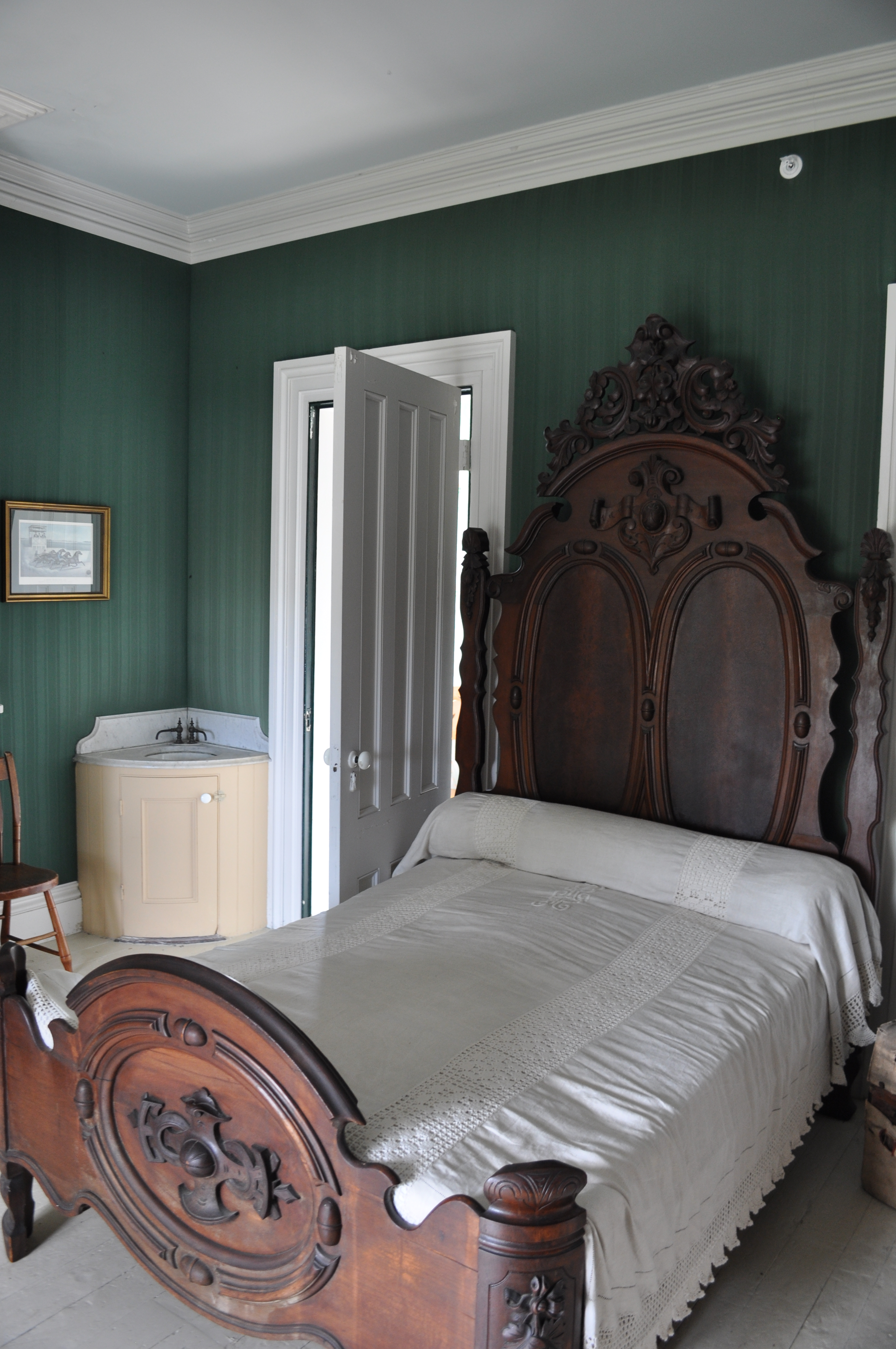
An upstairs room

== See also ==
- List of National Historic Landmarks in Connecticut
- National Register of Historic Places listings in New London County, Connecticut
