= Nathaniel Palmer =

American naval explorer and seal hunter (1799–1877)

Nathaniel Brown Palmer
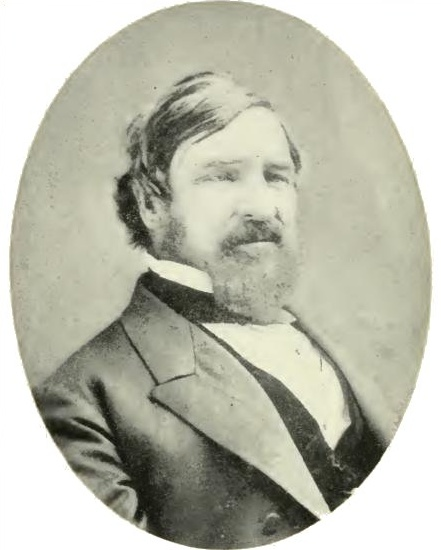
- Born: August 8, 1799; Stonington, Connecticut, U.S.
- Died: June 21, 1877 (aged 77)
- Monuments: Capt. Nathaniel B. Palmer House, Palmer Station, Palmer Land, Palmer Archipelago, N.B. Palmer (clipper), Nathaniel B. Palmer (icebreaker)
- Other name: "Captain Nat"
- Occupations: Sealing captain, explorer, sailing captain, and ship designer
- Known for: among the first Americans to see Antarctica

Nathaniel Brown Palmer (August 8, 1799 – June 21, 1877) was an American seal hunter, explorer, sailing captain, ship designer, and a whale hunter, known for being one of the first persons to sight continental Antarctica. He gave his name to Palmer Land, which he explored in 1820 on his sloop Hero. He was born in Stonington, Connecticut, and was a descendant of Walter Palmer, one of the town's founders.

== Sealing career and Antarctic exploration ==
During the 1810s the hides of Antarctic Ocean seals were highly valued as items for trade with China. Palmer served as second mate on board Hersilia's first voyage, during which she became the first American vessel known to reach the South Shetland Islands. As a skilled and fearless seal hunter, Palmer achieved his first command at the early age of 21. His vessel, a diminutive sloop named Hero, was only 47 feet (14 m) in length. Palmer steered southward in Hero at the beginning of the Antarctic summer of 1820–1821. Aggressively searching for new seal rookeries south of Cape Horn, on November 17, 1820, Palmer and his men became the first Americans and the fourth group of people to discover the Antarctic Peninsula. Larger ships skippered by Fabian Gottlieb von Bellingshausen and Edward Bransfield had reported sighting land earlier in 1820. Along with English sealer George Powell, Palmer also co-discovered the nearby South Orkney Islands archipelago. The first one to land and not only see the continental part of Antarctica may have been Andrew MacFarlane, a Scottish to the service of Chile in October 1820, as well as the American John Davis in February 1821.

== Merchant marine career and development of the clipper ships ==
After concluding a successful sealing career, Palmer, still in the prime of life, switched his attention to the captaining of fast sailing ships for the transportation of express freight. In 1843, Captain Palmer took command of Paul Jones on her maiden voyage from Boston to Hong Kong, arriving in 111 days. In this new role, the Connecticut captain traveled many of the world's principal sailing routes. Observing the strengths and weaknesses of the ocean-going sailing ships of his time, Palmer suggested and designed improvements to their hulls and rigging. The improvements made Palmer a co-developer of the mid-19th century clipper ship.

Capt. Palmer purchased the Capt. Loper house in 1836, in Stonington, Connecticut. The Loper family were primarily whalers out of East Hampton, Long Island. Capt. Jacob Loper had four sons who brought whaling to Nantucket, Massachusetts; the Delaware Bay, southern New Jersey; and, Stonington, Connecticut. The composite character of Ismael in Moby Dick is based on events in the life of one of his children, who was the only survivor of an 1835 sinking off Japan, in which all were lost but young James Loper, who floated upon a coffin for a week. In the Capt. Loper House library Capt. Palmer found many old maps, including two of the coastline of Antarctica, made by the Lopers while working with The Dutch East India Company. The Loper family invented "All Found", which meant that berth and food were not deducted from sailors' pay, insuring eager crews for Capt. James Loper. Escaping slaves likewise signed on as each sailor was paid the same rate. All African-Americans with the last name of "Loper" can trace their lineage back to this time, taking their last name from the Dutch Loper family. Between 1852 and 1854 Capt. Palmer built his home in Stonington which is today known as the Capt. Nathaniel B. Palmer House. The house is of a transitional style combining elements of the Greek Revival and Victorian Italianate styles. It was designated a National Historic Landmark in 1996 and is now the headquarters of the Stonington Historical Society.

Palmer closed his sailing career and established himself in his hometown of Stonington as a successful owner of clipper ships sailed by others. He died in San Francisco June 21, 1877, at the age of 77.

== Legacy in the Antarctic and beyond ==
Palmer Land, part of the Antarctic Peninsula, as well as the Palmer Archipelago, were named in his honor.

The Antarctic science and research program operated by the U.S. government continues to recall Palmer's role in the exploration of the Antarctic area. Palmer Station, located in the seal islands that Palmer explored, the clipper ship N.B. Palmer (built by Jacob Aaron Westervelt) and the Antarctic icebreaker RV Nathaniel B. Palmer are named after Captain Palmer.

Hero Bay, in the South Shetland Islands, is named for Captain Palmer's sloop Hero, one of the vessels of the Pendleton sealing fleet from Stonington which visited the islands in 1820–21.

Also named after Palmer's sloop Hero is Hero Rupes, an escarpment which was discovered in the southern hemisphere of the planet Mercury in 1973.

On September 14, 1988, the U.S. Postal Service issued a stamp honoring Nathaniel Palmer.

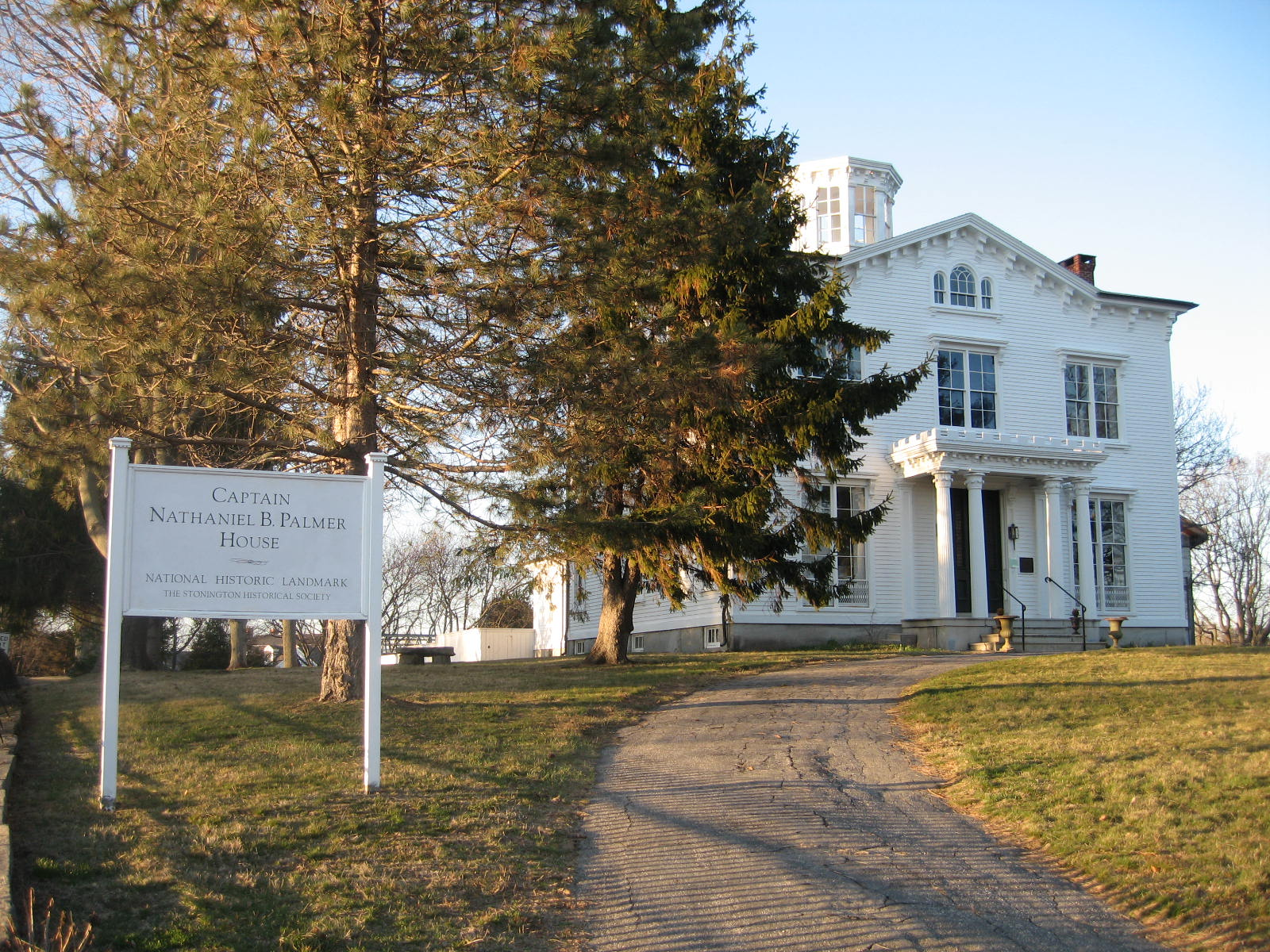
Capt. Nathaniel B. Palmer House, Stonington, Connecticut

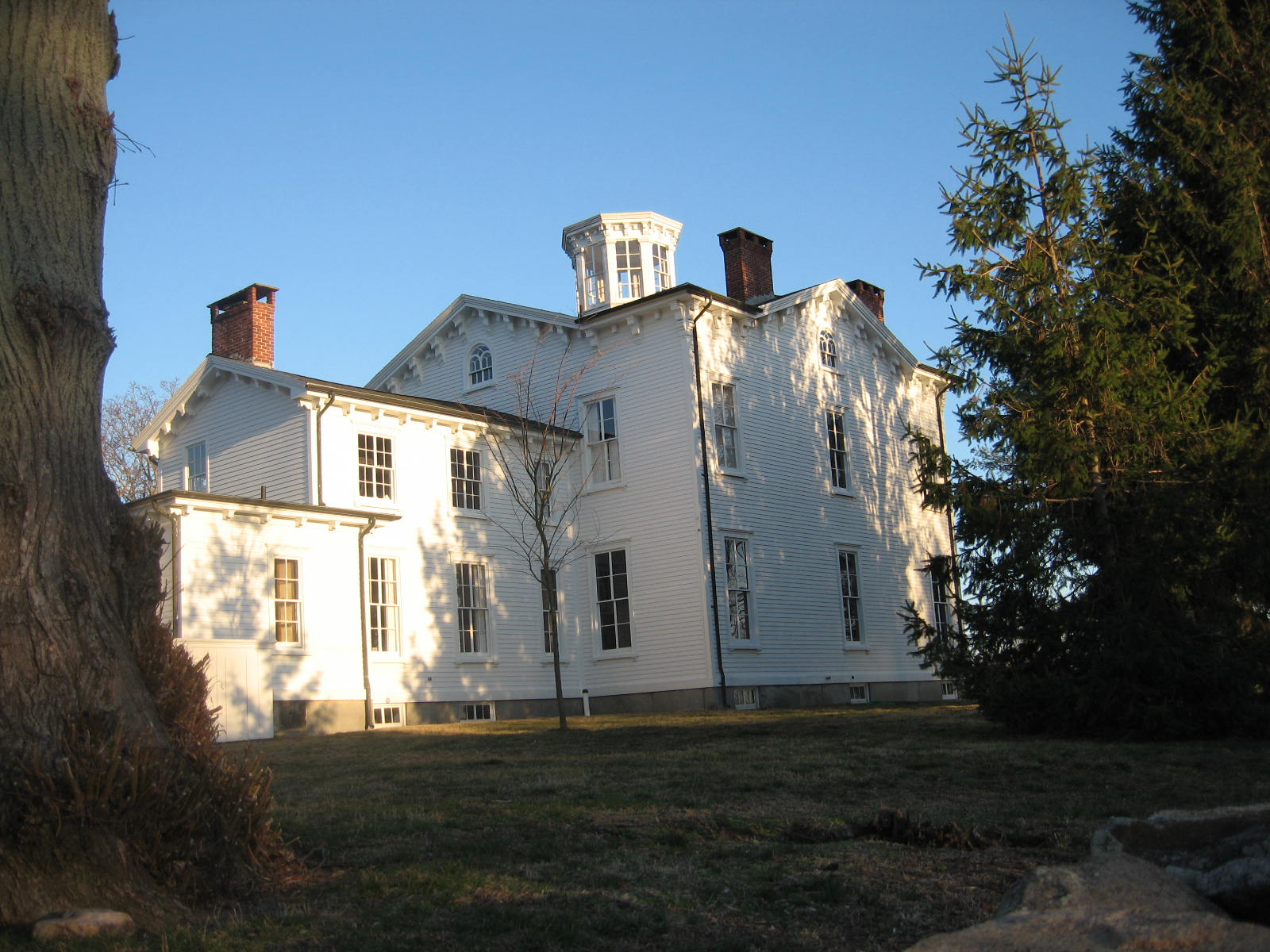
Capt. Nathaniel B. Palmer House, rear view with widow's walk (the lookout on the roof)

His home in Stonington, the Capt. Nathaniel B. Palmer House, was declared a National Historic Landmark in 1996. According to the records of the Grand Lodge AF&AM of Connecticut, he was initiated in 1826 by the Loper family. His record of membership ends in the year of his death and was reported at a special meeting of Asylum Lodge of Masons in Stonington, CT No. 57 on June 29, 1877, a Seafarer's Lodge. The Masonic Service Association of North America published a Short Talk Bulletin in March 2007 that is Vol. 85 No. 3 which details his history and attests to his membership in the Masonic Fraternity.

== See also ==
- History of Antarctica
- Houqua, innovative early clipper ship which Capt. Nat helped design
- Paul Jones, ship which N.B. Palmer sailed on its maiden voyage
- N.B. Palmer (clipper), named after Capt. Palmer
- Capt. Nathaniel B. Palmer House
