= Snug Harbor (disambiguation) =

Snug Harbor is the former home for seamen on Staten Island, New York.

Snug Harbor or Snug Harbour may also refer to:

- Snug Harbor (jazz club)
- Sailors Snug Harbor of Boston, former home for seamen in Boston
- Snug Harbour, a community in Carling, Ontario
- Snug Harbour, a former community near Norman's Bay, Newfoundland and Labrador
- Snug Harbor 18, an American sailboat design
- Snug Harbor, a village within the town of South Kingstown, Rhode Island
- Snug Harbor, Michigan, an unincorporated community
