= Paul Jones (1843 ship) =

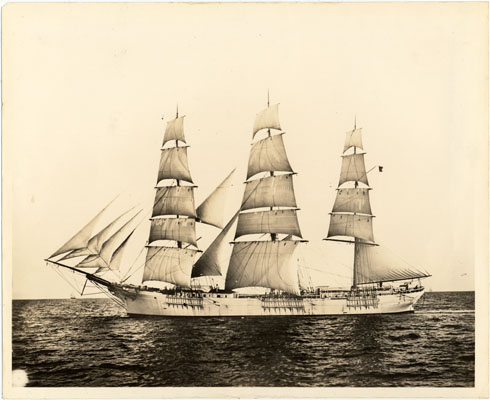
- Paul Jones

History

United States
- Name: Paul Jones
- Owner: Daniel C. Bacon, R.B. Forbes, John M. Forbes of Boston, Russell & Co
- Builder: Waterman & Ewell, Medford, MA
- Laid down: 1842
- Launched: 1843

General characteristics
- Class & type: Clipper
- Tons burthen: 624 tons
- Length: 144 ft. 6 in.
- Beam: 30 ft. 8 in.
- Sail plan: Full-rigged ship

The Paul Jones was a Medford-built ship, launched in 1843, that brought the first cargo of ice to China.

== Voyages ==
Paul Jones sailed from Boston on Jan. 15, 1843, on her maiden voyage, arriving in Hong Kong in 111 days, under captain N.B. Palmer.

The ship made a fast passage in 1848, from Java Head to New York City, in 76 days.

== First cargo of ice to China ==
Paul Jones sailed in the ice carrying trade, which had been built up over the course of more than two decades by the "Ice King", Frederic Tudor. Tudor experimented with various materials for packing and insulating bulk ice, such as "rice and wheat chaff, hay, tan bark, and even coal dust." He eventually settled on sawdust. When Tudor extended the business from Charleston, Savannah, New Orleans, and Havana to the Far East, Paul Jones brought the first cargo of ice to China.

R.B. Forbes sent a small quantity of ice to India aboard Paul Jones in 1843, and a full cargo aboard the ship Bombay in 1847.

Captain Forbes, in his reminiscences, has slightly different dates: "The Paul Jones, in 1844, took the first American ice to China, and, on her way to Bombay, landed apiece at Singapore; whereupon the Singapore Free Press congratulated the people on the prospect of getting ice from China! In January, 1847, I was concerned in shipping the first cargo of ice in the ship Bombay, to Whampoa."

== Role in design of the first clipper ship ==
In 1843, the A. A. Low & Bros. representative in Canton, William Low, and his pregnant wife Ann had been passengers on a very slow and frustrating trip home from Canton with Captain Nathaniel Palmer on the Paul Jones. "To vent his frustration [Captain Nat] began carving a block of wood into the shape of what he thought the ideal hull of a Canton trader should look like, one that .. 'would outsail anything afloat' ... "He incorporated John W. Griffiths' ideas concerning a sharp concave bow with his own ideas of a fuller flat-bottomed hull."

Upon arrival in New York, they approached A. A. Low & Bros. with the new design, which was further developed and built by David Brown of Brown & Bell shipyard. The ship, Houqua, launched in 1844, was considered by many to be the first clipper ship.
