= Howqua =

Chinese hong merchant (1769–1843)

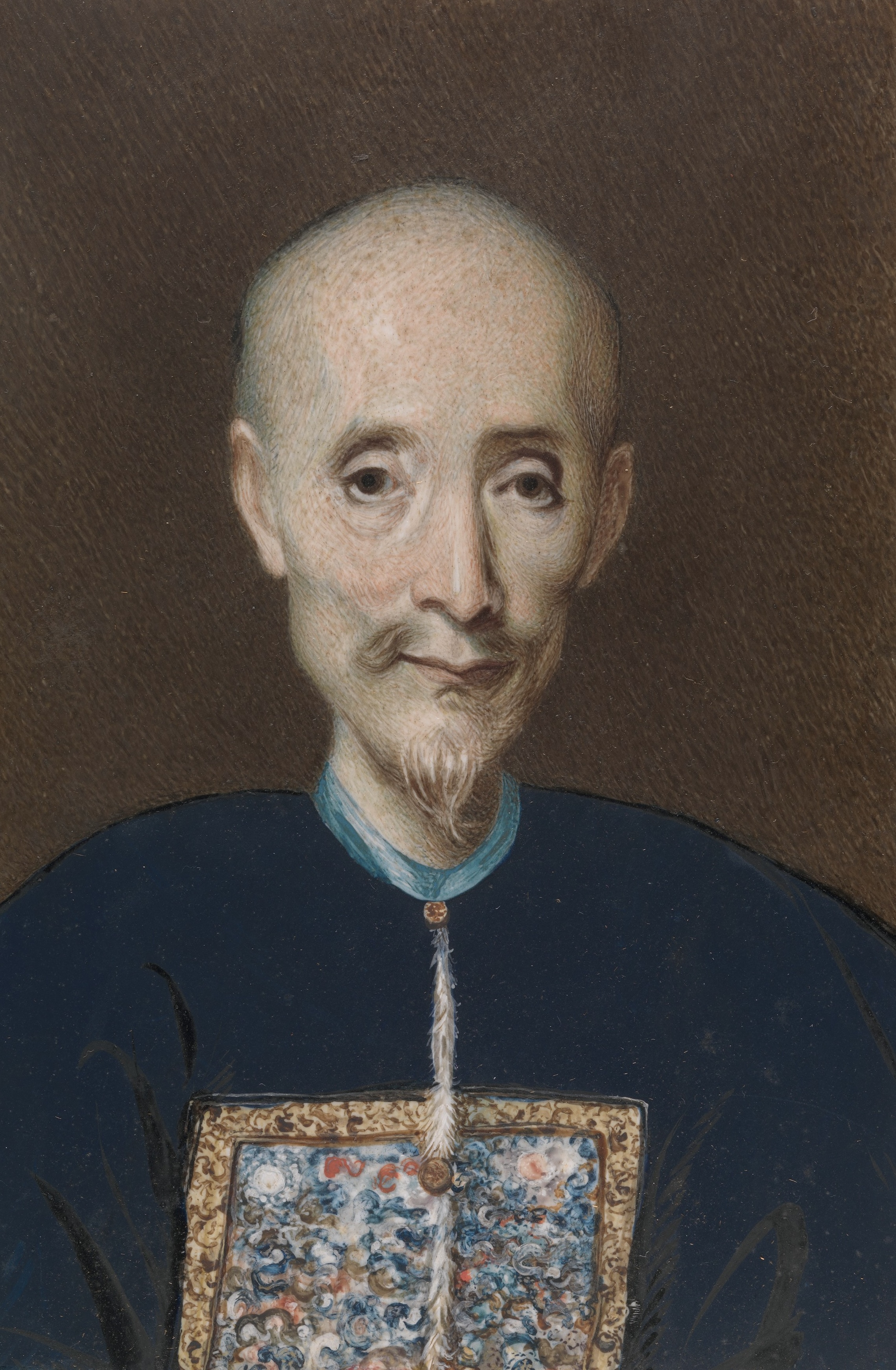
- Portrait, c. 1840–1849
- Born: Wu Bingjian; 1769; Guangzhou, China
- Died: 4 September 1843 (age 75); Guangzhou, China
- Known for: Founding of the E-wo hong
- Children: At least five, and adopted John Murray Forbes.

Howqua
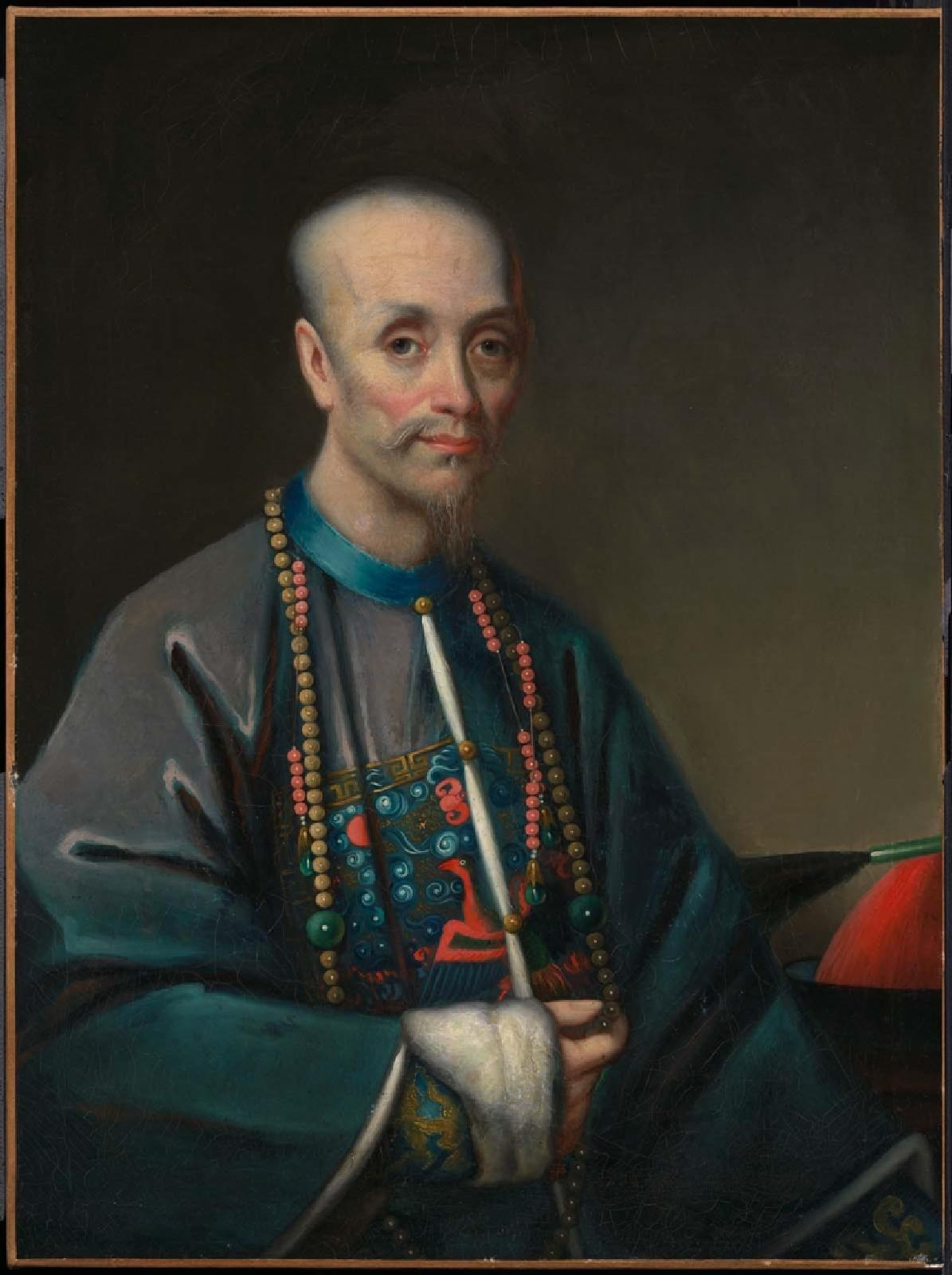
- Portrait by an unidentified artist
- Chinese: 伍秉鑑
Transcriptions
Standard Mandarin
- Hanyu Pinyin: Wǔ Bǐngjiàn
- Wade–Giles: Wu Ping-chien
- Yale Romanization: Wǔ Bǐngjyàn
- IPA: [ù pìŋtɕjɛ̂n]
Yue: Cantonese
- Yale Romanization: Ngh Bíng Gaam
- Jyutping: Ng5 Bing2 Gaam3
- IPA: [ŋ̬̍ pɪ̌ŋ kāːm]
Southern Min
- Hokkien POJ: Ngó͘ Péng-kàm

Business name
- Chinese: 浩官
Transcriptions
Standard Mandarin
- Hanyu Pinyin: Hào Guān
- Wade–Giles: Hao Kuan
- Yale Romanization: Hàu Gwān
Yue: Cantonese
- Yale Romanization: Houh Gūn
- Jyutping: Hou6 Gun1
- IPA: [hòu kúːn]
Southern Min
- Hokkien POJ: Hō-koaⁿ

Wu Bingjian (Chinese: 伍秉鑑; 1769 – 4 September 1843), trading as "Houqua" and better known in the West as "Howqua" or "Howqua II", (Note: Two other merchants from this period were known as Howqua: The Hong merchant Lin Shimao and Wu Bingjun's father, Wo Guoying, also known as Howqua I.) was a hong merchant in the Thirteen Factories, head of the E-wo hong and leader of the Canton Cohong. He was once the richest man in the world.

== Biography ==
A Hokkien by his paternal ancestry with ancestry from Quanzhou, Wu was known by the Europeans as Howqua, as was his father, Wu Guorong, the founder of the family business or hong. The name "Howqua" is a romanization, in his native Hokkien, of the business name under which he traded, "浩官" (Pe̍h-ōe-jī: Hō-koaⁿ). He became rich on the trade between China and the British Raj in the middle of the 19th century during the First Opium War. Perhaps the wealthiest man in China during the nineteenth century, Howqua was the senior of the hong merchants in Canton, one of the few authorized to trade silk and porcelain with foreigners. In an 1822 fire which burned down many of the cohongs, the silver that melted allegedly formed a little stream almost two miles in length. Of the three million dollars that the Qing regime was required to pay the British as stipulated in the 1842 Treaty of Nanking, Howqua allegedly helped raise one million. He died in Canton in 1843.

After the Opium Wars, Howqua's familial and business lineage quickly diminished. In 1891, the American trading house that had been handling Howqua's international investments, Russell & Company, collapsed. The descendants of Howqua are now commoners. What had been the massive and beautiful estate of the Howqua family is now relatively unmarked in a poor neighborhood in the region of Honam.

The founders of then world-renowned firms including James Matheson, William Jardine, Samuel Russell and Abiel Abbot Low all had a close relationship with Howqua. Portraits of Howqua in his robes still hang in Salem and Newport mansions built by American merchants grateful for his assistance.

== Legacy ==
Following the 1842 Treaty of Nanking, which spelled the end of the Thirteen Factories, Jardine Matheson & Co continued to use "Ewo" as their Chinese name.

A settlement on the east bank of Lake Eildon, 23 kilometres (14 mi) from Mansfield, in Victoria, Australia, is named after him, possibly by Chinese miners who passed through the area during the Victorian gold rush.

== See also ==
- Houqua, 1844 clipper ship

== Sources ==
- Grant, Frederic D. Jr. (2014). The Chinese Cornerstone of Modern Banking. Martinus Nijhoff Publishers. ISBN 978-90-04-27656-7.
- Downs, Jacques M. (2014). The Golden Ghetto. Introduction by Frederic D. Grant, Jr. Hong Kong University Press. ISBN 978-988-8139-09-5.
