= Robert Bennet Forbes =

American diplomat

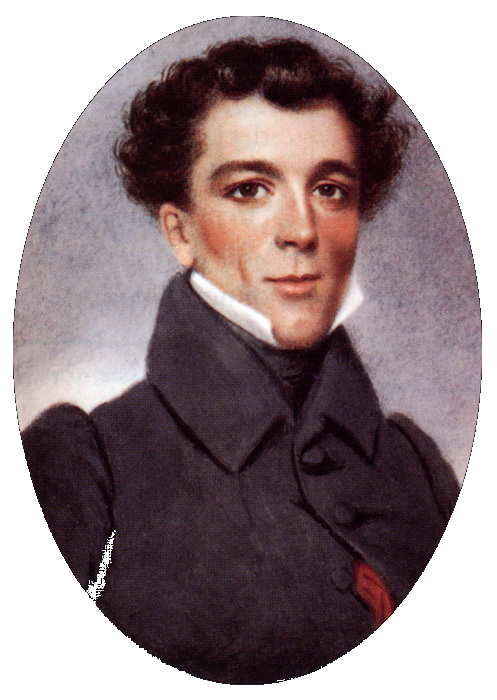
- Born: September 18, 1804; Boston, Massachusetts, U.S.
- Died: November 23, 1889 (aged 85); Milton, Massachusetts, U.S.
- Occupations: Businessman, sea captain, ship-owner
- Spouse: Rose Greene Smith (m. 1834)
- Children: 3
- Family: Forbes

Robert Bennet Forbes (September 18, 1804 – November 23, 1889), was an American sea captain, China merchant and ship owner. He was active in ship construction, maritime safety, the opium trade, and charitable activities, including food aid to Ireland, which became known as America's first major disaster relief effort.

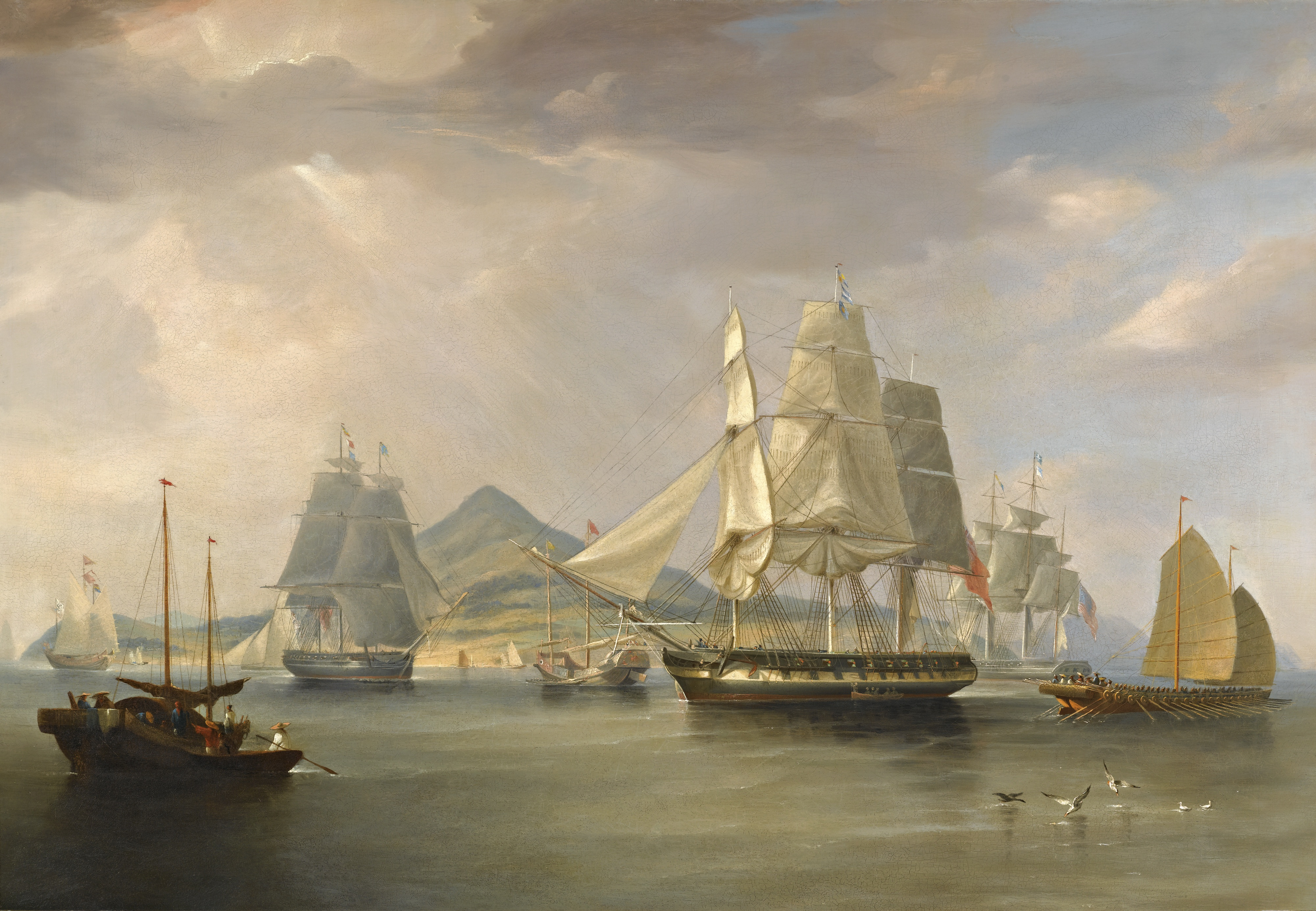
Opium ships at Lintin, 1824

== Early life ==
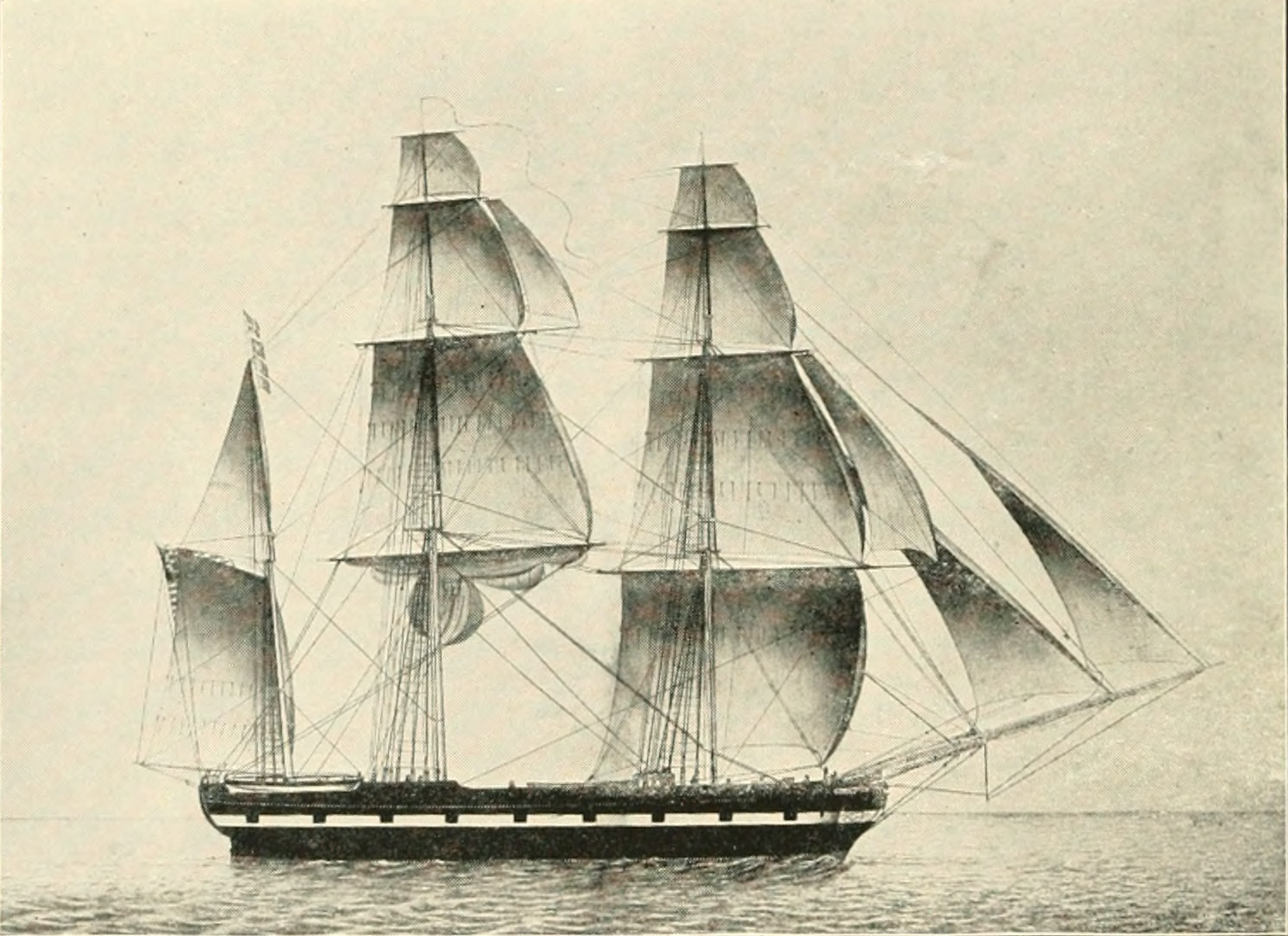
The bark Canton Packet, built for J. & T. H. Perkins of Boston

He was born in 1804 in Jamaica Plain, Boston, Massachusetts, to Ralph Bennet Forbes and Margaret Perkins, sister of the trader in slaves and China opium, Thomas Perkins. His brothers were Thomas Tunno Forbes and John Murray Forbes.

On October 19, 1817, at age 13, he joined the crew on his uncle Thomas' Canton Packet and made his first voyage to China, the first of the three brothers to do so. He arrived in Canton, China in March 1818 via the eastern route. He returned to Boston three months later.

In 1819, he made a second voyage aboard Canton Packet. On this voyage, he was promoted to third mate. He became second mate in 1821.

== Ships' command and Far East trade ==
Aboard Nile he sailed for Manila. He had been ship's master of Levant. He became a full captain in 1825. From Manila Nile went to China, then to California, and from there to Buenos Aires.

In 1828, he sailed Danube for Sturgis & Perkins on a trading voyage to Smyrna, Ottoman Empire and other European ports. He later was captain of Niantic.

When Russell & Company were merged with his uncle's Turkish opium trading firm in 1830, Forbes was placed in command of their opium storehouse vessel Lintin which was moored permanently at the Pearl River estuary island after which it was named. His work in supervising the repacking of the opium and negotiating trades with drug smugglers made him his first fortune. From his ample means, he made generous provision for his mother and younger brother. He visited China several times and became the American vice-consul at Canton.

In 1834, he married Rose Greene Smith and they had three children: Robert Bennet Forbes (1837-1891), Edith Forbes who married Charles Eliot Perkins, and James Murray Forbes (1845-1885).

In 1841, he witnessed the Battle of Kowloon between the Qing Dynasty and the British Empire from aboard his rowboat.

He died on November 23, 1889, aged 85, in Milton, Massachusetts.

== Ships ==
Forbes owned or was involved in the construction of approximately seventy vessels.

His first ship was Lintin, a 390-ton bark built by Sprague and James in Medford, Massachusetts, in 1830. Forbes owned Lintin from 1830–1832, after which time she sailed in Chinese waters. Forbes also owned Paul Jones, which took the first cargo of ice to China. "During the Civil War he was employed as a volunteer by the government to inspect the building of nine gunboats and at the same time built for himself and others the Meteor, of 1500 tons."

The Sylph, yacht and pilot-boat, built in Boston in 1834 by Whitmore & Holbrook. was owned by Forbes. Her construction was overseen by Forbes.

== Forbes rig ==
The Forbes rig was also well received on Mermaid, as this 1852 excerpt from the "Boston Atlas" transcribed by Bruzelius shows:

THE CLIPPER BARQUE MERMAID, Captain Smith, recently arrived, made the passage from Canton to New York in 87 days. The telegraph, when she arrived, reported Capt. Forbes as her commander, instead, no doubt of stating that she had Forbes's rig. This rig is working its way slowly into favor with ship-owners, and when its advantages are known, it will soon be universally adopted. It is the proper rig for large clippers ... The Mermaid ... has tested it in a voyage around the world, and like other vessels with it, has sailed with less men, than if she had been rigged in the usual style.

The Forbes rig was publicly rejected, however, by the captain of N.B. Palmer in 1855, in favor of the Howe rig.

== Legacy ==
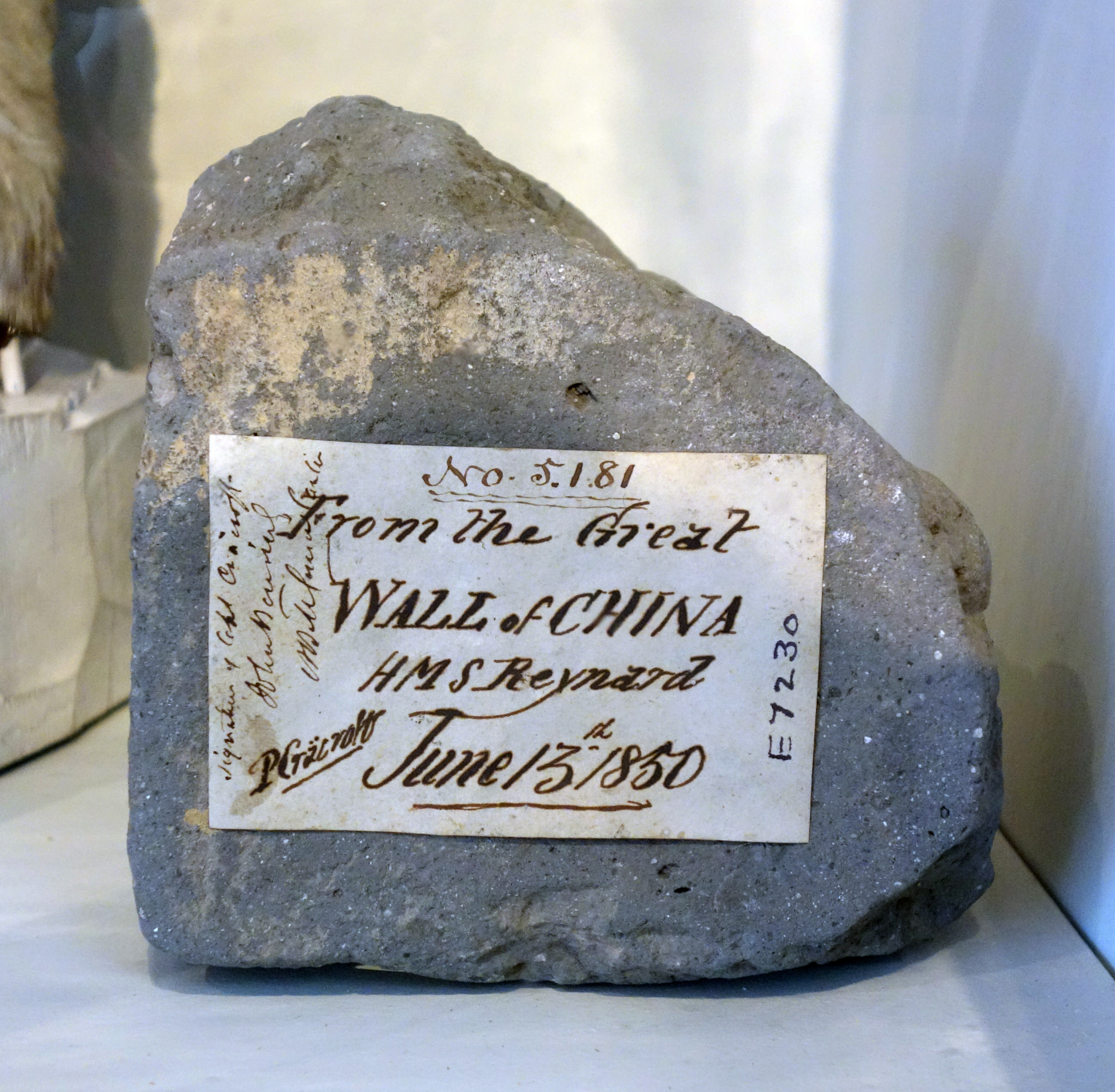
Fragment of brick from the Great Wall of China, collected in 1850 by Peter Cracroft, captain of HMS Reynard, and presented to the East India Marine Society in Salem, Massachusetts, by Robert Forbes in 1852

He built a Greek Revival mansion for his mother in Milton, Massachusetts, designed by Isaiah Rogers (1833), that is now the Captain Robert Bennet Forbes House Museum.

"Captain Forbes was a member and an officer of the Massachusetts Humane Society, one of the Boston pilot commissioners, member of the government of the Board of Trade, one of the vestry of King's Chapel, member of the Boston Port Society, and at one time and another a director of various railroad and insurance companies."

Forbes was awarded the medal of the Liverpool Shipwreck and Humane Society in 1849 for gallant conduct. The Cunard steamship Europa, on which Forbes was a passenger, ran down and sank an emigrant ship, Charles Bartlett. Forbes jumped from the bulwarks of the Europa into the water and rescued first a woman and child, and then a man.

In 1852, he was one of the founders and first president of the Sailors' Snug Harbor of Boston, a retirement home for "decrepit, infirm or aged sailors".

In private writings, while noting that the flooding of China with opium was "demoralizing" millions of workers and "draining the country of money," he noted that he made his "fortune" by selling the drug. He wrote that he had "no moral feeling of indignation connected with the business" despite his awareness of the human costs and the Chinese government's aims to make opium illegal, turning Forbes and his fellows into smugglers. The opium trade led by western powers sparked several wars, led to the downfall of one Chinese dynasty and directly killed untold thousands of addicts.

== Writings ==
Forbes' writings, most of them pamphlets, include:

- Forbes, Robert Bennet (1844). Remarks on China and the China Trade. Boston: Samuel N. Dickinson, printer.
- Forbes, Robert Bennet (1847). The Voyage of the Jamestown on Her Errand of Mercy. Boston: Eastburn Press. "Robert Bennet Forbes."
- An Appeal to Merchants and Ship Owners, on the Subject of Seamen. A Lecture delivered at the request of the Boston Marine Society. Boston: Sleeper & Rogers. 7 March 1854.
- On the Establishment of a Line of Mail Steamers ... to China (1855)
- Remarks on Ocean Steam Navigation (1855)
- The Forbes Rig (1862)
- Means for Making the Highways of the Ocean more Safe (1867)
- Remarks on Magnetism and Local Attraction (1875)
- Forbes, Robert Bennet (1876). Personal Reminiscences (1882 2nd; 1892 3rd ed.). Boston: Little, Brown, and Company. "Robert Bennet Forbes."
- The Lifeboat and other Life-saving Inventions (1880)
- New Rig for Steamers (1883)
- Notes on Navigation (1884)
- Loss of Life and Property in the Fisheries (1884)
- Forbes, Robert Bennet (1888). Notes on Ships of the Past. Boston: [s.n.]
