= Stonington Harbor Light =

Stonington Harbor Light Stonington Harbor Light
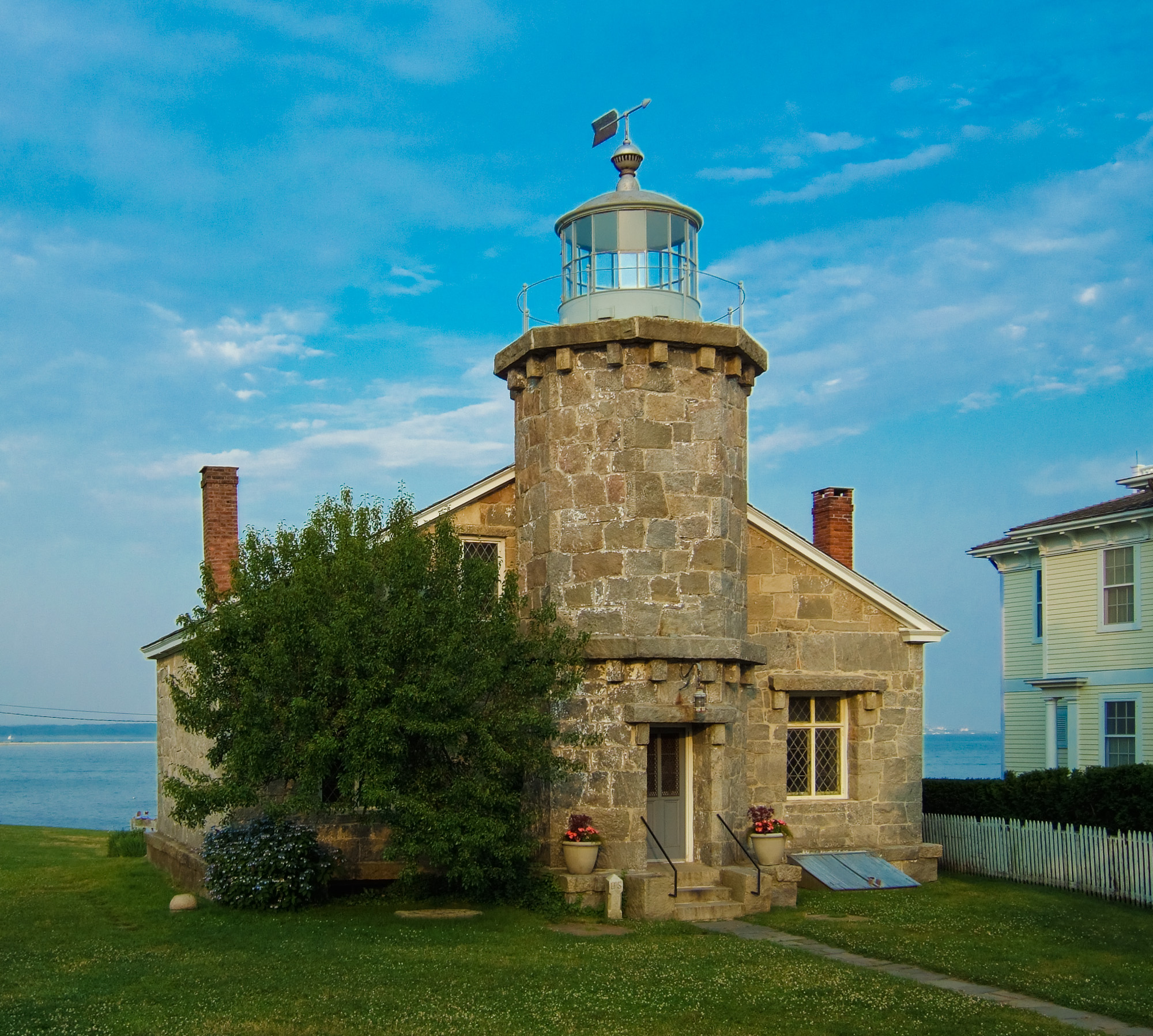
- Location: Stonington, Connecticut, United States
- Coordinates: 41°20′N 71°55′W

Tower
- Constructed: 1823
- Construction: granite (tower)
- Height: 11 m (36 ft)
- Shape: octagonal prism tower with balcony and lantern attached to the front keeper's house
- Operator: Stonington Historical Society
- Heritage: National Register of Historic Places listed place

Light
- First lit: 1840
- Deactivated: 1889
- Focal height: 19 m (62 ft)
- Lens: sixth order Fresnel lens (1856–), fifth order Fresnel lens
- Range: 15 mi (24 km)
- Characteristic: Fl G 5s
- Stonington Harbor Lighthouse
- U.S. National Register of Historic Places
- Area: 1 acre (0.40 ha)
- Built: 1840
- Built by: John Bishop
- Architectural style: Lighthouse
- NRHP reference No.: 76002000
- Added to NRHP: January 1, 1976

The Stonington Harbor Light is a historic lighthouse built in 1840 and located on the east side of Stonington Harbor in the Borough of Stonington, Connecticut. It is a well-preserved example of a mid-19th century stone lighthouse. The light was taken out of service in 1889 and the building has served as a museum for the Stonington Historical Society since 1925. It was listed on the National Register of Historic Places in 1976.

== Description and history ==
The Stonington Harbor Light is located at the southern end of Stonington Point, marking the eastern side of Stonington Harbor. The light station consists of the tower and keeper's house; both are built out of large granite blocks, and the keeper's house has a wood-framed ell attached. The tower is an octagonal stone structure 35 feet (11 m) in height and 10 feet (3.0 m) in diameter, with a circular glass lantern house on top. The house is 1½ stories and about 30 feet (9.1 m) square.

The federal government built a lighthouse on Windmill Point in Stonington Harbor in 1823; it was housed in a small granite lighthouse and was known by the same name. However, erosion led to its being torn down and its materials reused in the construction of this lighthouse. The light was originally lit by an oil lamp and broadcast by eight parabolic reflectors. This technology was already obsolete at the time of the lighthouse's construction, and it was replaced by a sixth-order Fresnel lens in 1856.

In the 1880s, the Stonington Breakwater Light was constructed farther out in the harbor, and the Stonington Harbor Light was decommissioned in 1889. The site is now the home of the Stonington Historical Society which uses the building as The Old Lighthouse Museum. Holdings in the museum document the area's long and distinguished cultural and nautical history, and exhibits include the 1856 Fresnel lens.

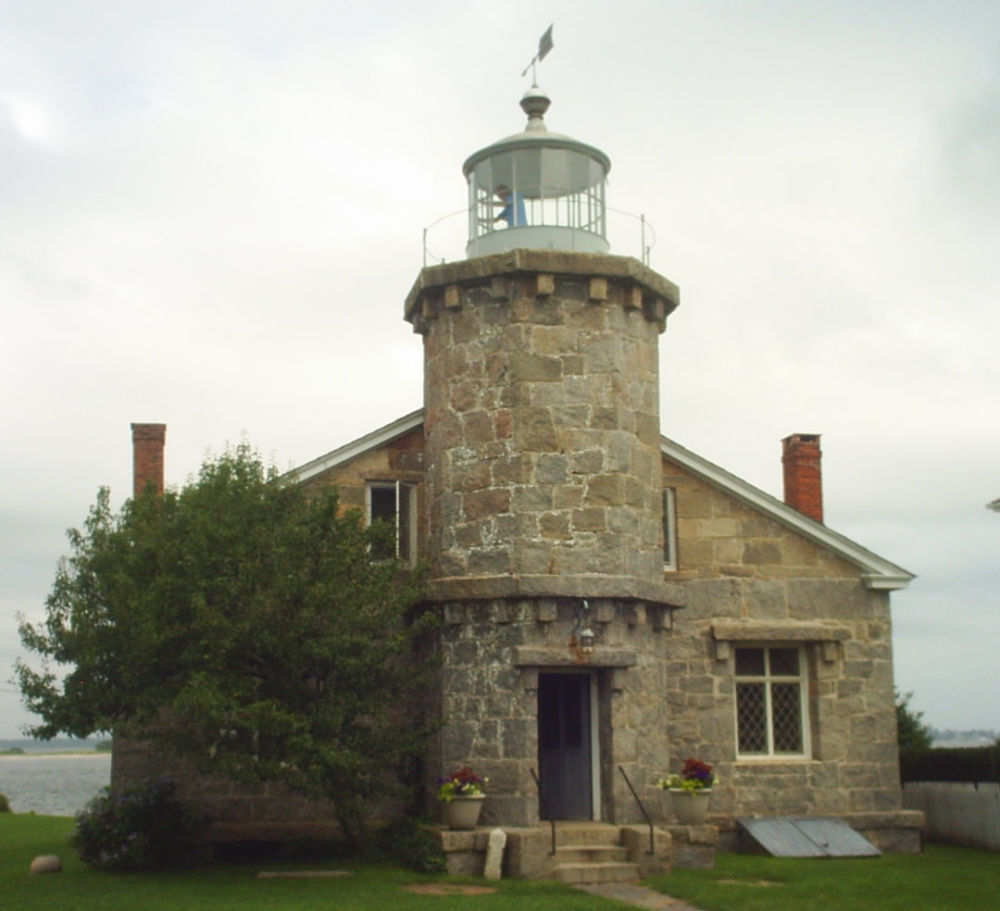

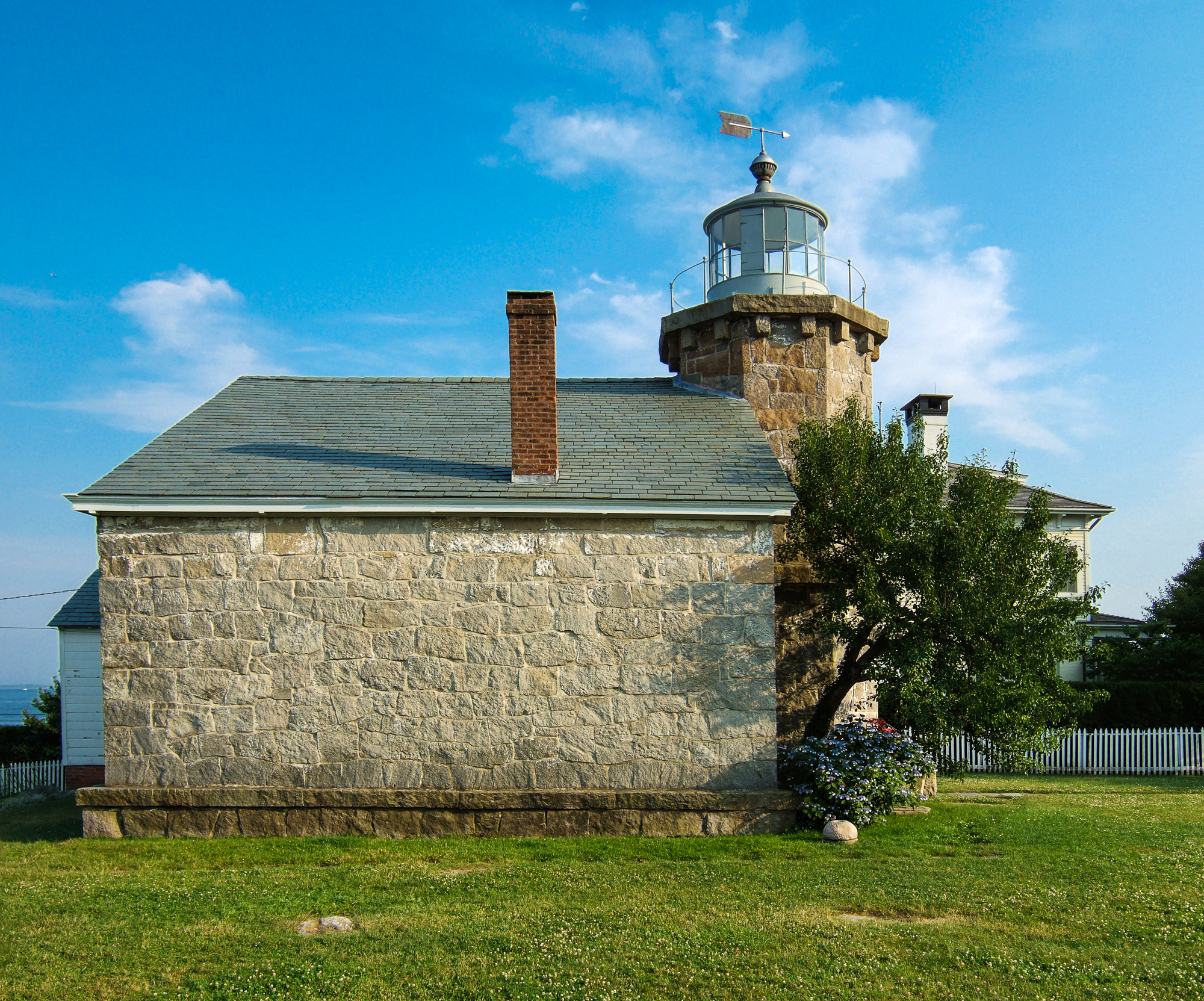

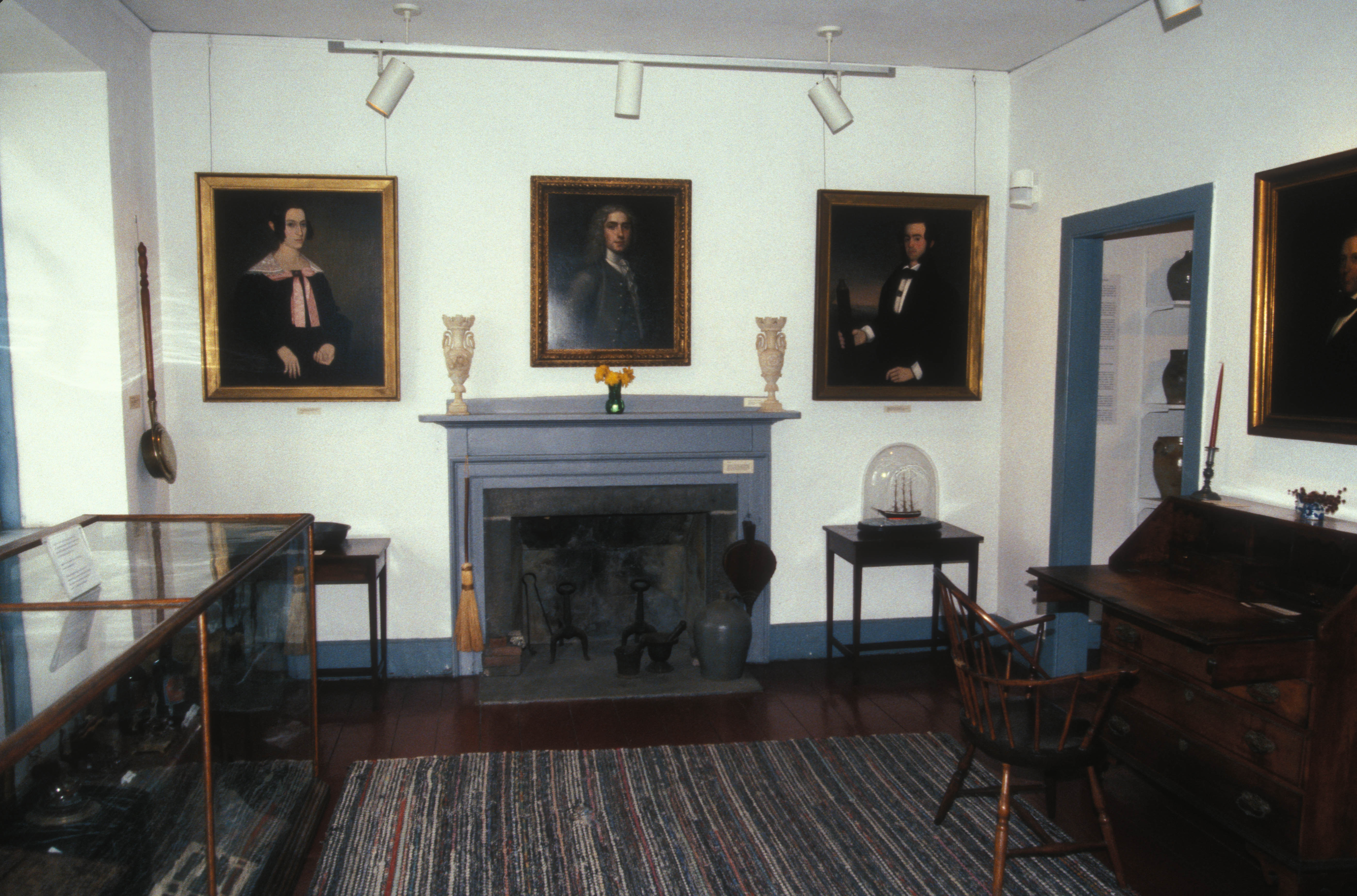

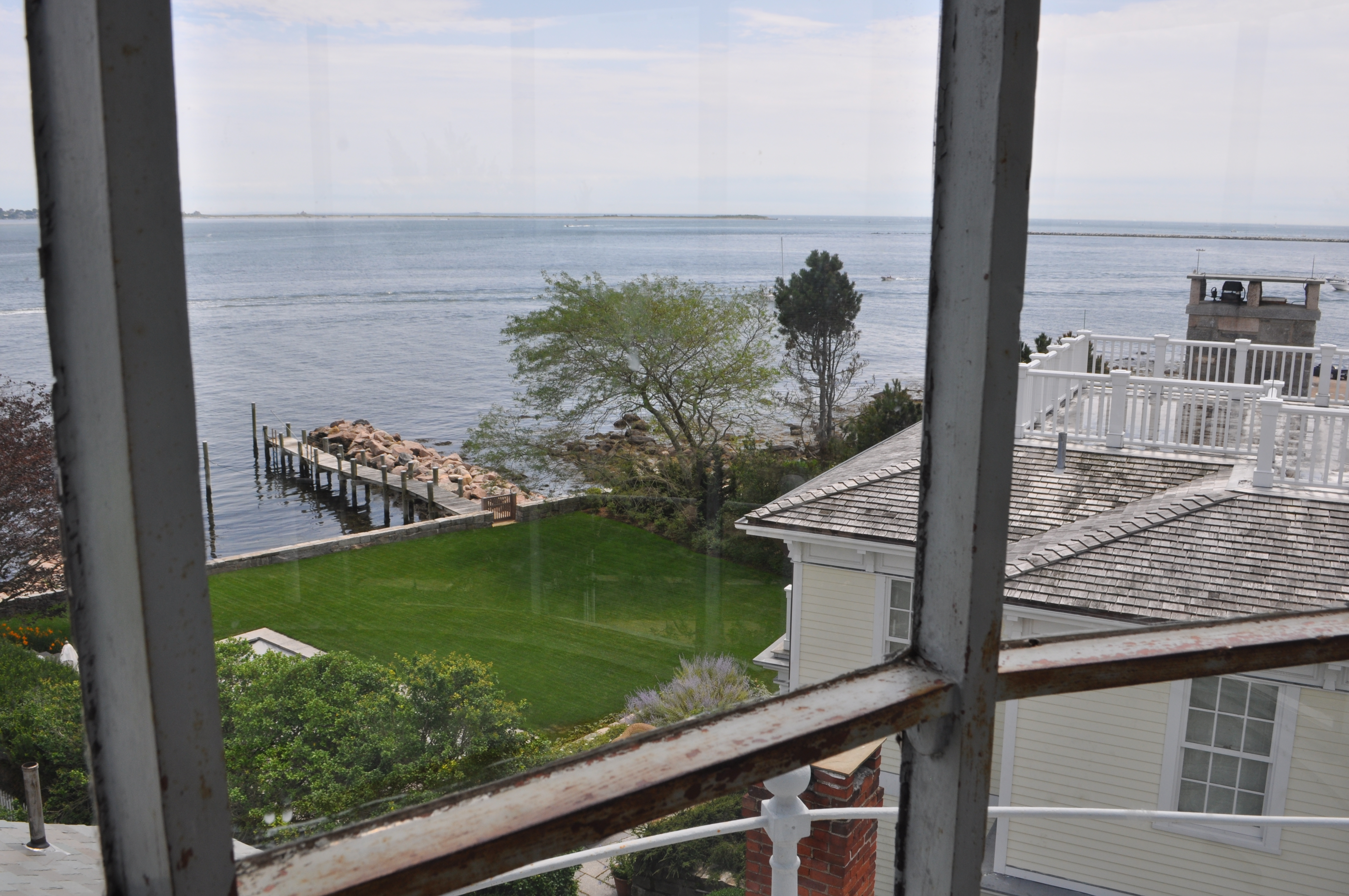
View from the lantern room

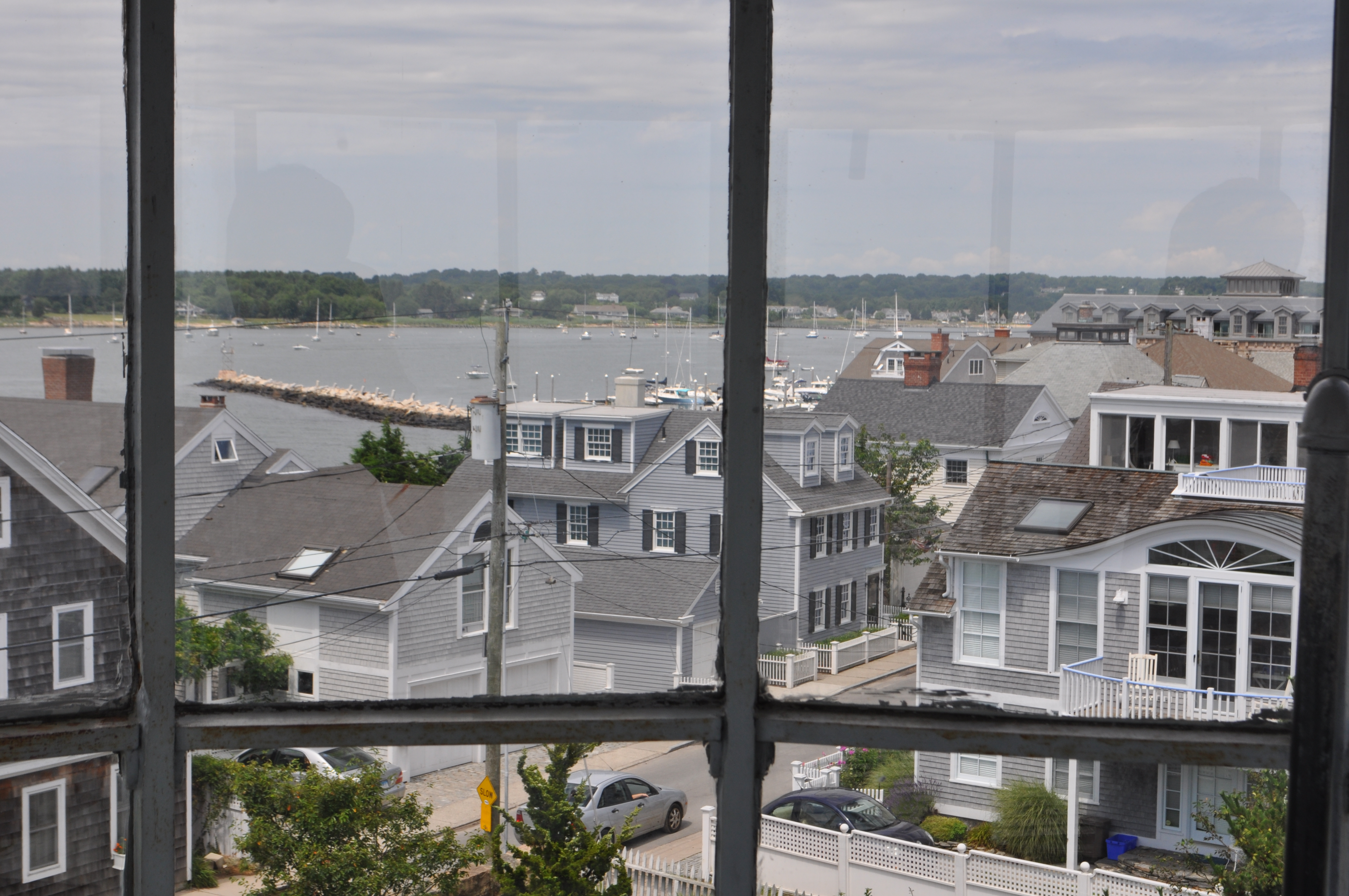
Another view from the lantern room

== Head keepers ==
- Neil Martin 1882
- Nahor Jones 1882 – 1886
- Samuel C. Gardiner 1886
- John Ryle 1886 – 1887
- Samuel A. Keeney 1887 – 1903
- Maurice Russell 1903 – 1904
- Adolph Obman 1904 – 1907
- John J. Cook 1907 – 1909
- William Janse 1909
- Adolph Obman 1909 – 1911
- Robert R. Laurier 1911 – 1912
- John H. Paul 1912
- Joseph Meyer 1913
- Charles R. Riley 1915 – 1916
- Edward Grime 1917 – 1919
- George Washington Denton, Jr. 1919
- Edward Murphy 1919 - 1920
- Edward Iten 1921 – 1927
- Edward M. Whitford 1929
- Robert M. Fitton 1930
- Raymond F. Bliven 1930 – 1931
- Martin Luther Sowle 1938 – 1953

== See also ==
- List of lighthouses in Connecticut
- List of lighthouses in the United States
- National Register of Historic Places listings in New London County, Connecticut
