= Stonington (borough), Connecticut =

Stonington
- Borough
- Borough of Stonington
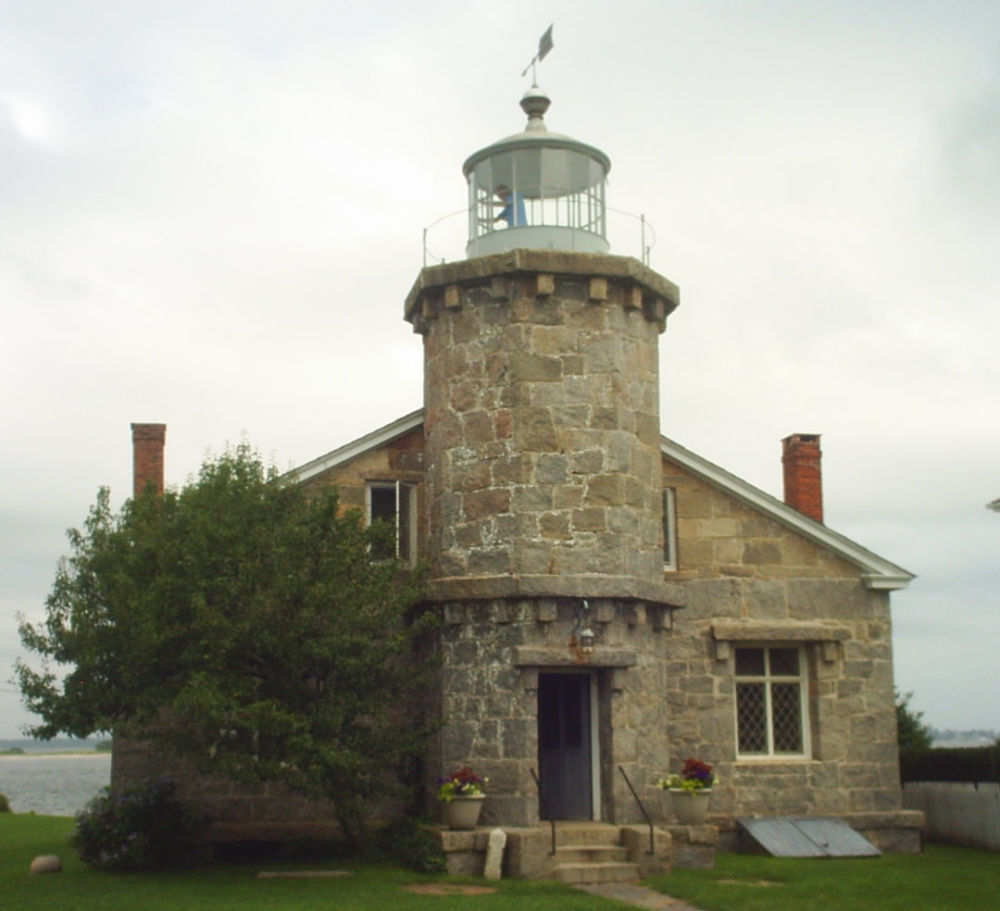
- Stonington Harbor Light

- Seal
- Etymology: Same name as the town it's located in
- Nickname: The Borough
- Coordinates: 41.3344°N 71.9058°W
- Country: United States
- state: Connecticut
- County: New London
- Region: Southeastern CT
- Town: Stonington

Government
  - Borough Warden: Jeffrey Callahan

Area
  - Total: 0.7 sq mi (1.8 km^{2})
  - Land: 0.3 sq mi (0.78 km^{2})
  - Water: 0.3 sq mi (0.78 km^{2})

Population (2020)
  - Total: 976
  - Density: 3,300/sq mi (1,300/km^{2})
- Time zone: UTC-5 (Eastern (EST))
  - Summer (DST): UTC-4 (EDT)
- ZIP Code: 06378
- Area code: 860
- FIPS code: 09-73700
- GNIS feature ID: 2378292
- Website: stoningtonboroughct.com

Stonington is a borough and the town center of Stonington, Connecticut, United States, referred to by locals as "The Borough". The population was 976 at the 2020 United States Census, up from 929 in 2010.

The densely built Borough of Stonington occupies a point of land that projects into Little Narragansett Bay. It has two main streets that link Cannon Square and Wadawanuck Square, named for the former Wadawanuck Hotel that brought wealthy visitors in the post-Civil War era. Its colonial, Federal, and Greek Revival architectures have been preserved through the lack of traffic or modern industry, together with the borough's role as a fashionable summer residence, while the activity of one of Connecticut's last remaining fishing and lobstering fleets keeps it from being simply a quaint, historic village. There is a large community of Portuguese descent.

== History ==
On August 30, 1775, a ship's tender chased two small private sloops into Stonington Harbor during the American Revolutionary War. The sloops had made it to the dock and discharged their passengers when the tender fired a broadside into the dock and stores before sailing out of the harbor again. It returned later in the company of another tender and HMS Rose. All three ships then bombarded the town throughout the day. The local militia assembled and returned fire, claiming to have killed five or six men aboard the ships.

A more damaging attack occurred between August 9 and 12, 1814 during the War of 1812. The British vessels HMS Ramillies, HMS Pactolus, HMS Dispatch, and HMS Terror appeared offshore on August 9, 1814 under the command of Sir Thomas Hardy. The British demanded immediate surrender, but Stonington's citizens replied with a note that stated, "We shall defend the place to the last extremity; should it be destroyed, we shall perish in its ruins." The Royal Navy pounded the town for three days, but the only fatality was that of an elderly woman who was mortally ill. They sailed off on August 12 after suffering many dead and wounded.

The bombardiers with bomb and ball
Soon made a farmer's barrack fall,
And did a cow-house badly maul
That stood a mile from Stonington.
They kill'd a goose, they kill'd a hen
Three hogs they wounded in a pen—
They dashed away and pray what then?
This was not taking Stonington.
But some assert, on certain grounds,
(Beside the damage and the wounds),
It cost the king ten thousand pounds
To have a dash at Stonington.

— Philip Freneau

The Stonington Harbor Light is a low stone building erected in 1840. In 1925, it became the flagship museum of the Stonington Historical Society, making it the oldest lighthouse museum in America. Throughout the 19th century, Stonington supported a small fishing, whaling, and sealing fleet, with some direct trade with the West Indies, enough in volume for it to be made a port of entry in 1842. The small granite Customs House faces Main Street just north of Cannon Square. Today, Stonington boasts the last commercial fishing fleet in Connecticut.

== Geography ==
According to the United States Census Bureau, the borough has a total area of 0.7 square miles (1.8 km^{2}), of which 0.3 square miles (0.9 km^{2}) is land and 0.3 square miles (0.9 km^{2}), or 50.72%, is water.

== Demographics ==
Historical population
Census	Pop.	Note	%±
1900	2,278		—
1910	2,083		−8.6%
1920	2,100		0.8%
1930	2,006		−4.5%
1940	1,826		−9.0%
1950	1,739		−4.8%
1960	1,622		−6.7%
1970	1,413		−12.9%
1980	1,228		−13.1%
1990	1,100		−10.4%
2000	1,032		−6.2%
2010	929		−10.0%
2020	976		5.1%
U.S. Decennial Census

As of the census of 2000, there were 1,032 people, 556 households, and 260 families residing in the borough. The population density was 3,071.2 inhabitants per square mile (1,185.8/km^{2}). There were 723 housing units at an average density of 2,151.6 per square mile (830.7/km^{2}). The racial makeup of the borough was 96.90% White, 0.58% Black or African American, 0.29% Native American, 0.29% Asian, 0.10% Pacific Islander, 0.29% from other races, and 1.55% from two or more races. Hispanic or Latino of any race were 0.97% of the population.

There were 556 households, out of which 13.5% had children under the age of 18 living with them, 37.1% were married couples living together, 8.3% had a female householder with no husband present, and 53.1% were non-families. 46.6% of all households were made up of individuals, and 16.5% had someone living alone who was 65 years of age or older. The average household size was 1.82 and the average family size was 2.54.

In the borough the population was spread out, with 12.8% under the age of 18, 4.3% from 18 to 24, 27.5% from 25 to 44, 33.1% from 45 to 64, and 22.3% who were 65 years of age or older. The median age was 48 years. For every 100 females, there were 86.3 males. For every 100 females age 18 and over, there were 85.6 males.

The median income for a household in the borough was $53,000, and the median income for a family was $78,324. Males had a median income of $43,472 versus $34,375 for females. The per capita income for the borough was $45,444. About 3.3% of families and 8.0% of the population were below the poverty line, including 9.0% of those under age 18 and 5.1% of those age 65 or over.

== Education ==
The borough, along with the rest of Stonington Town, is in Stonington School District.

== Gallery ==
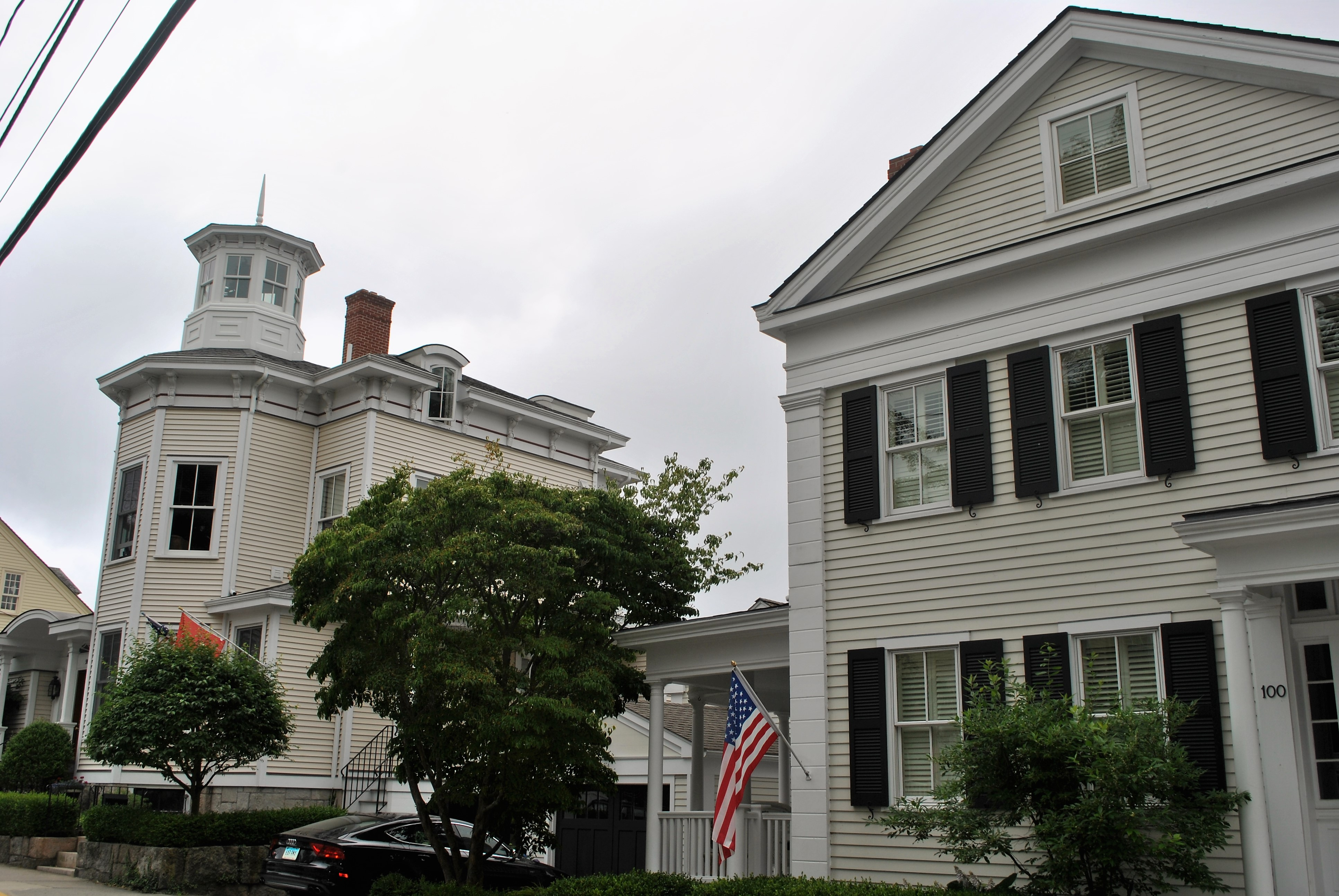

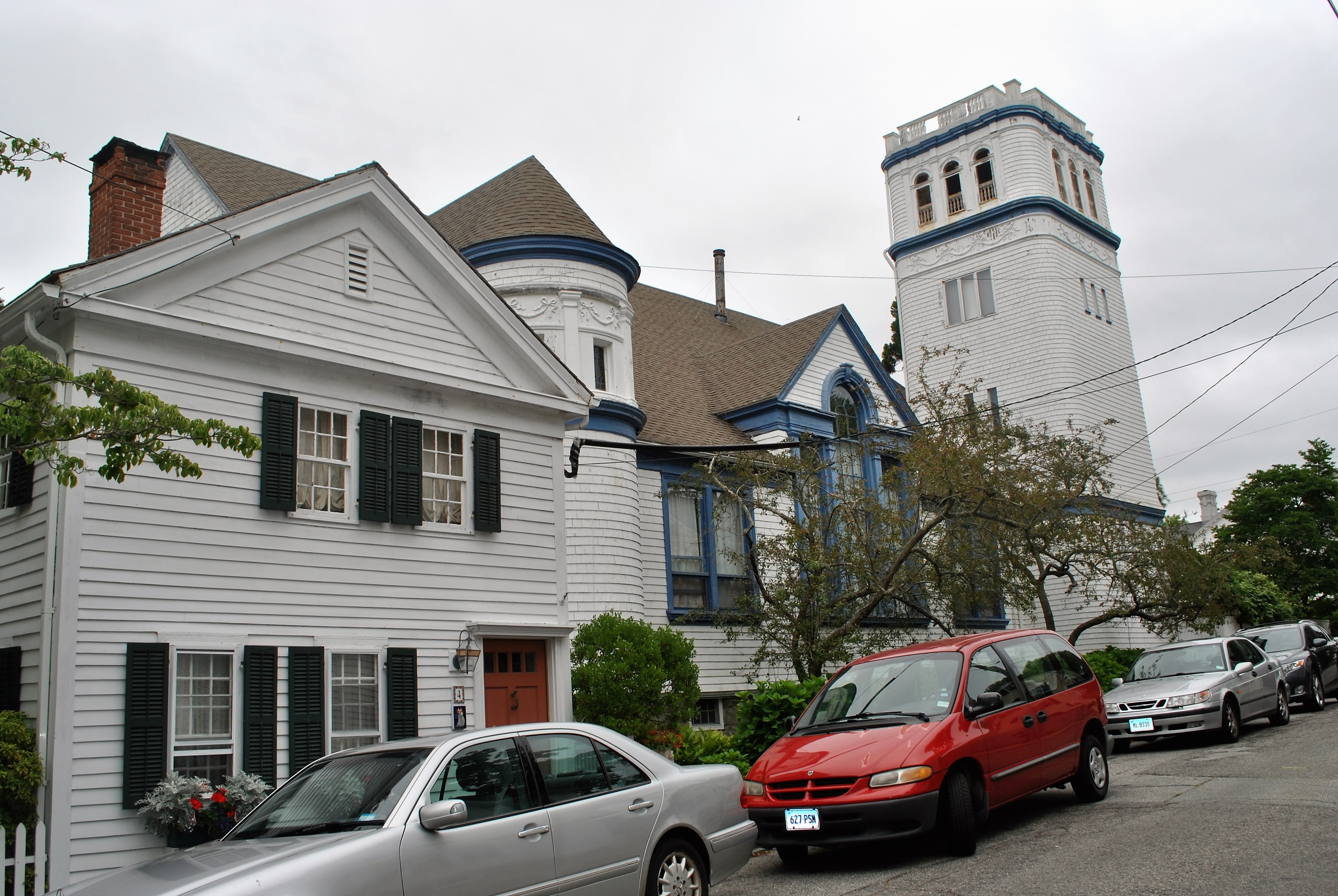

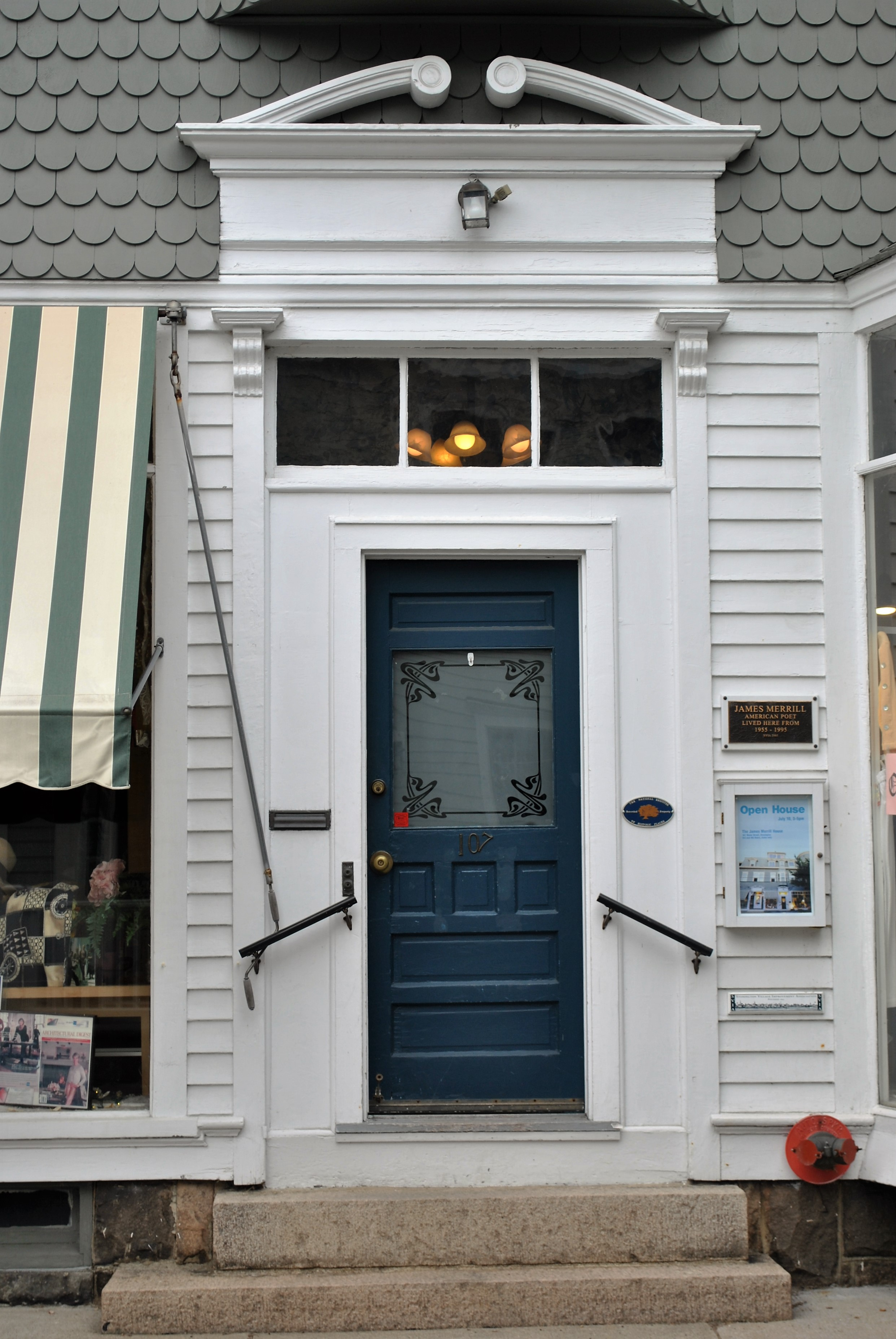

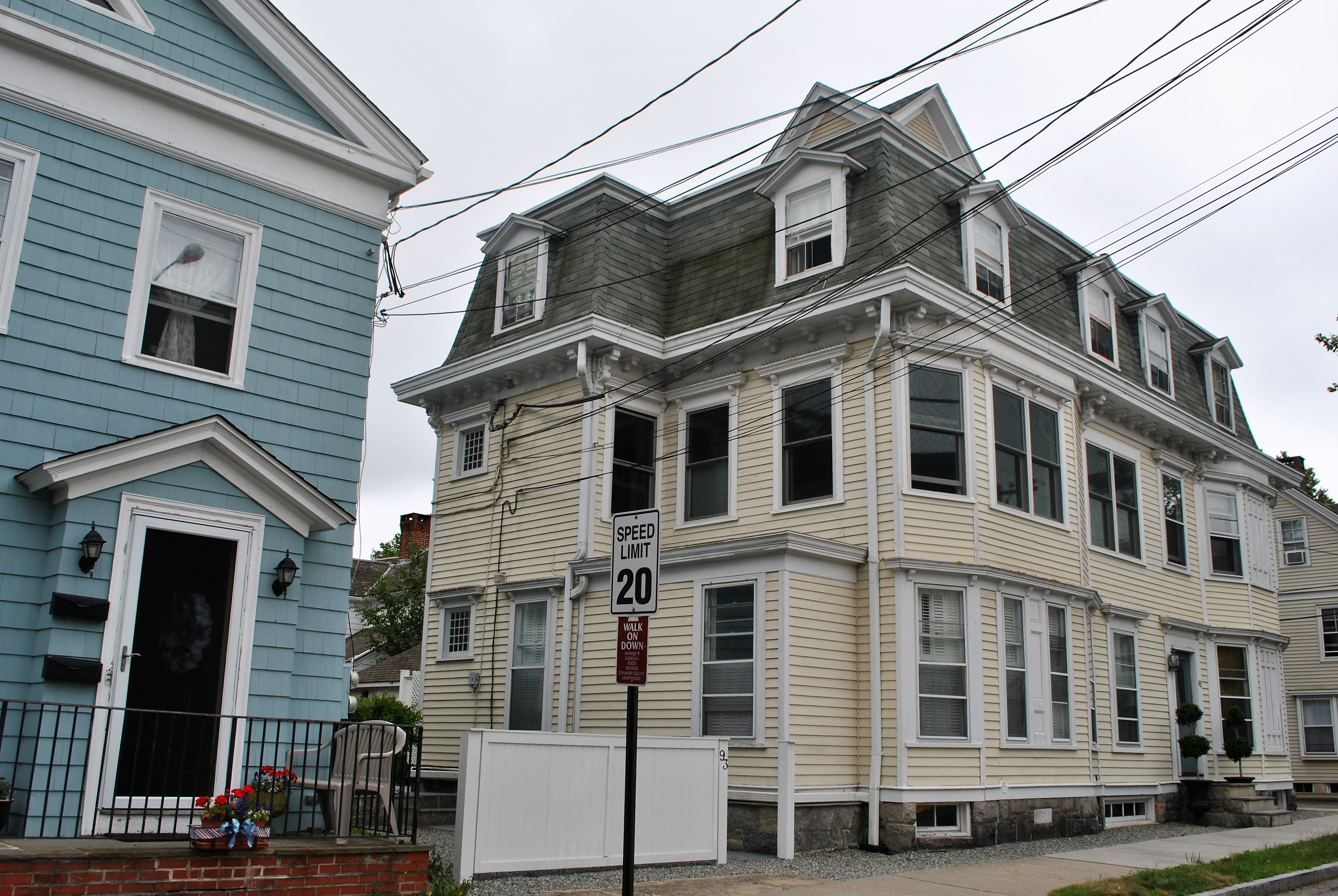

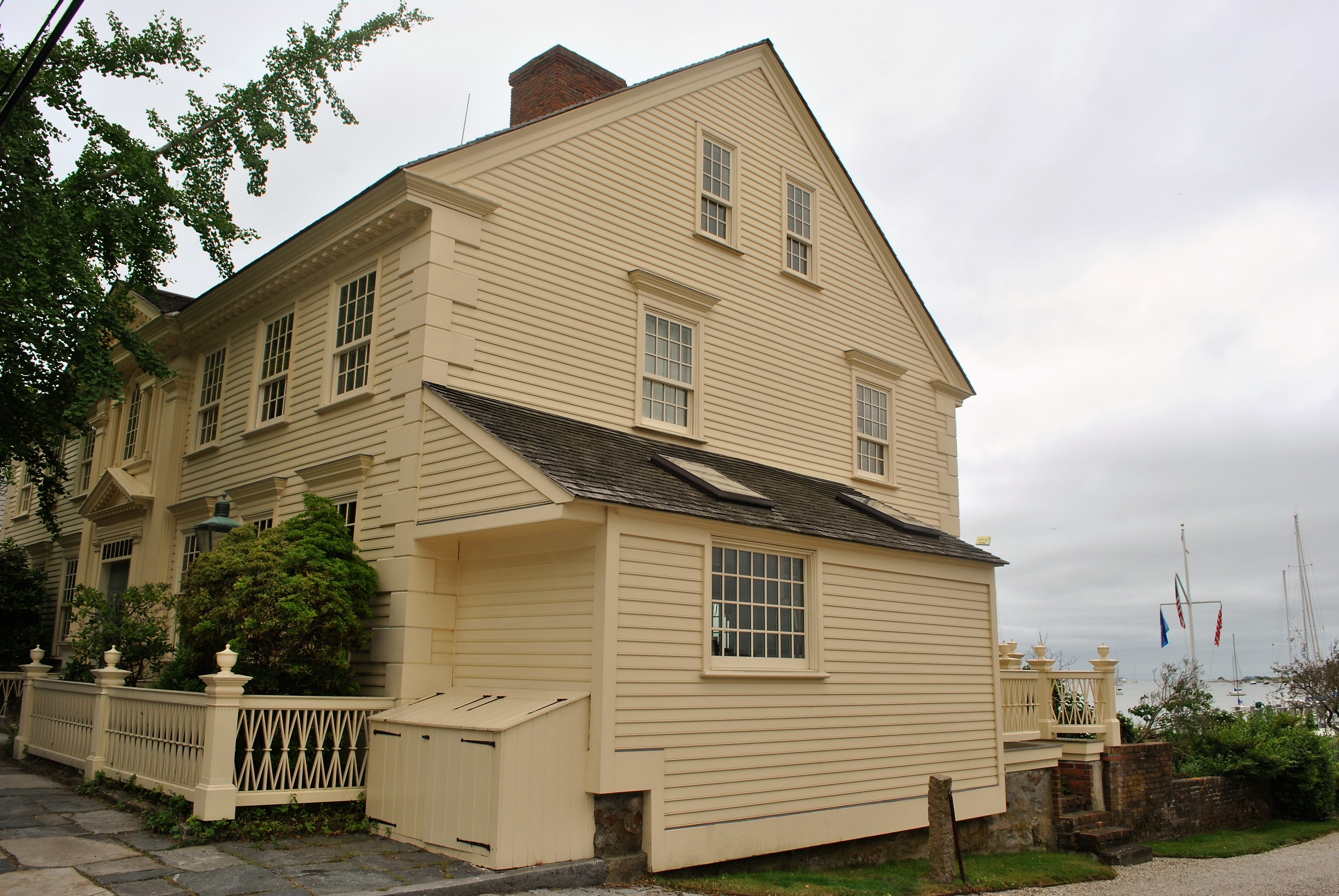

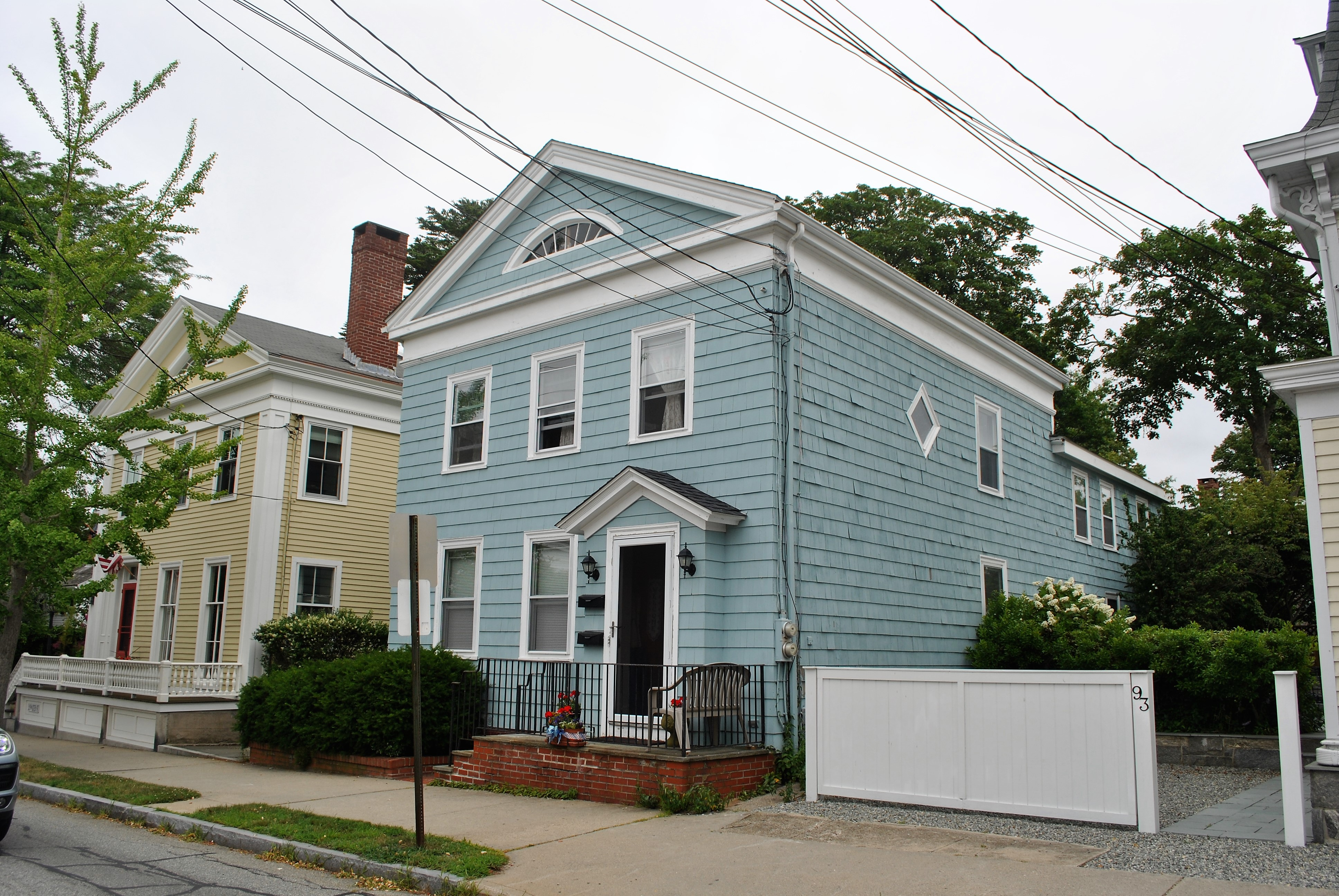

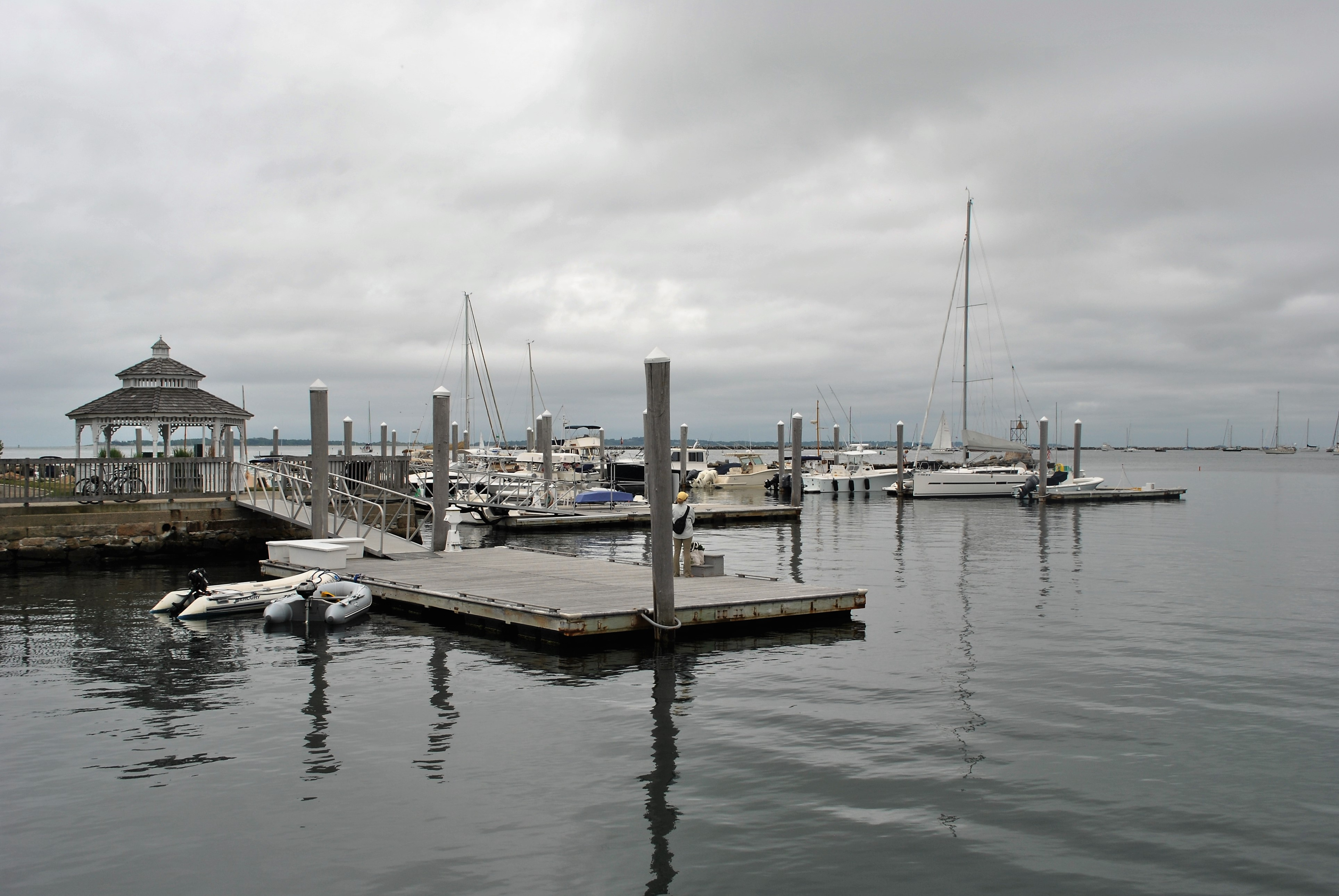

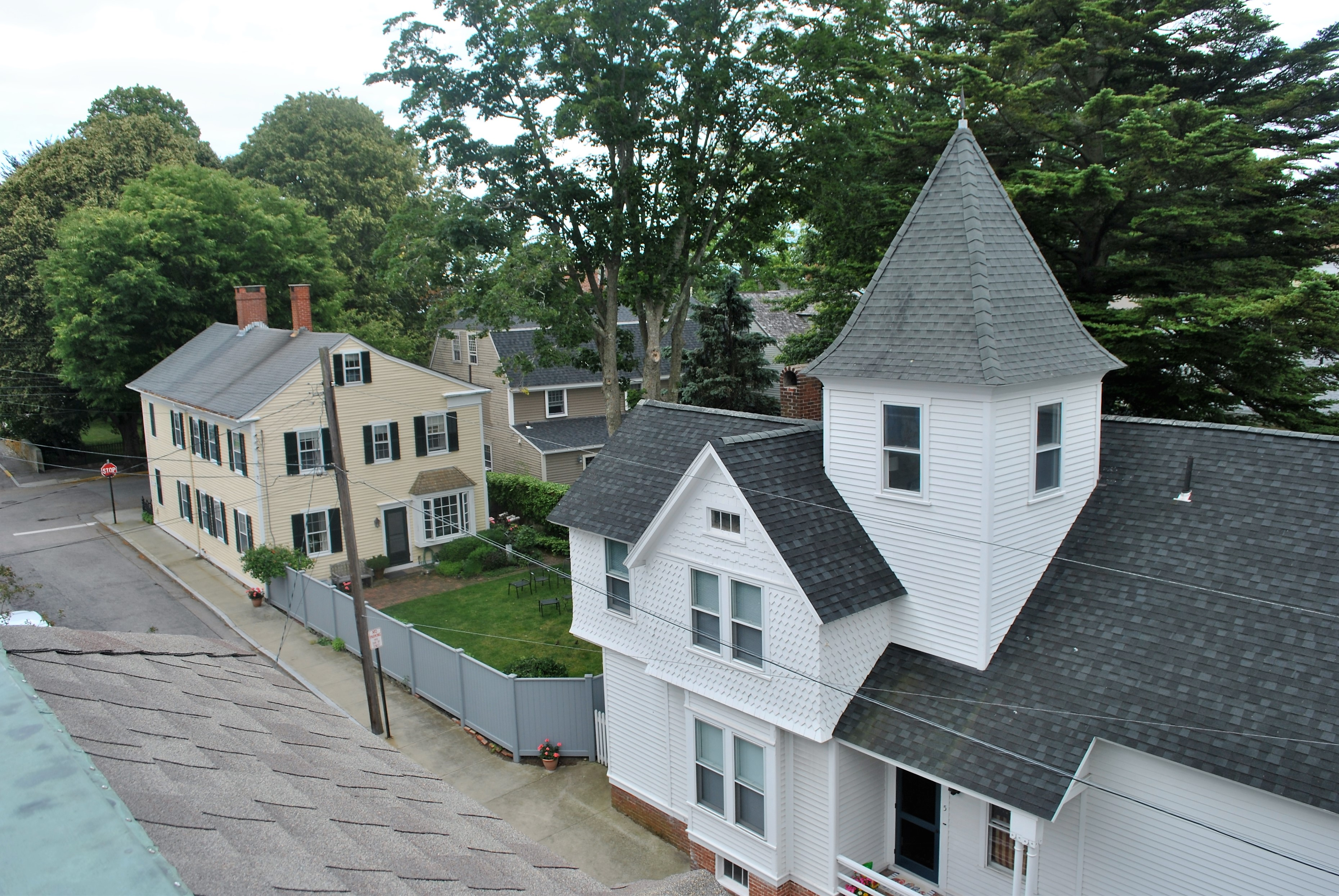

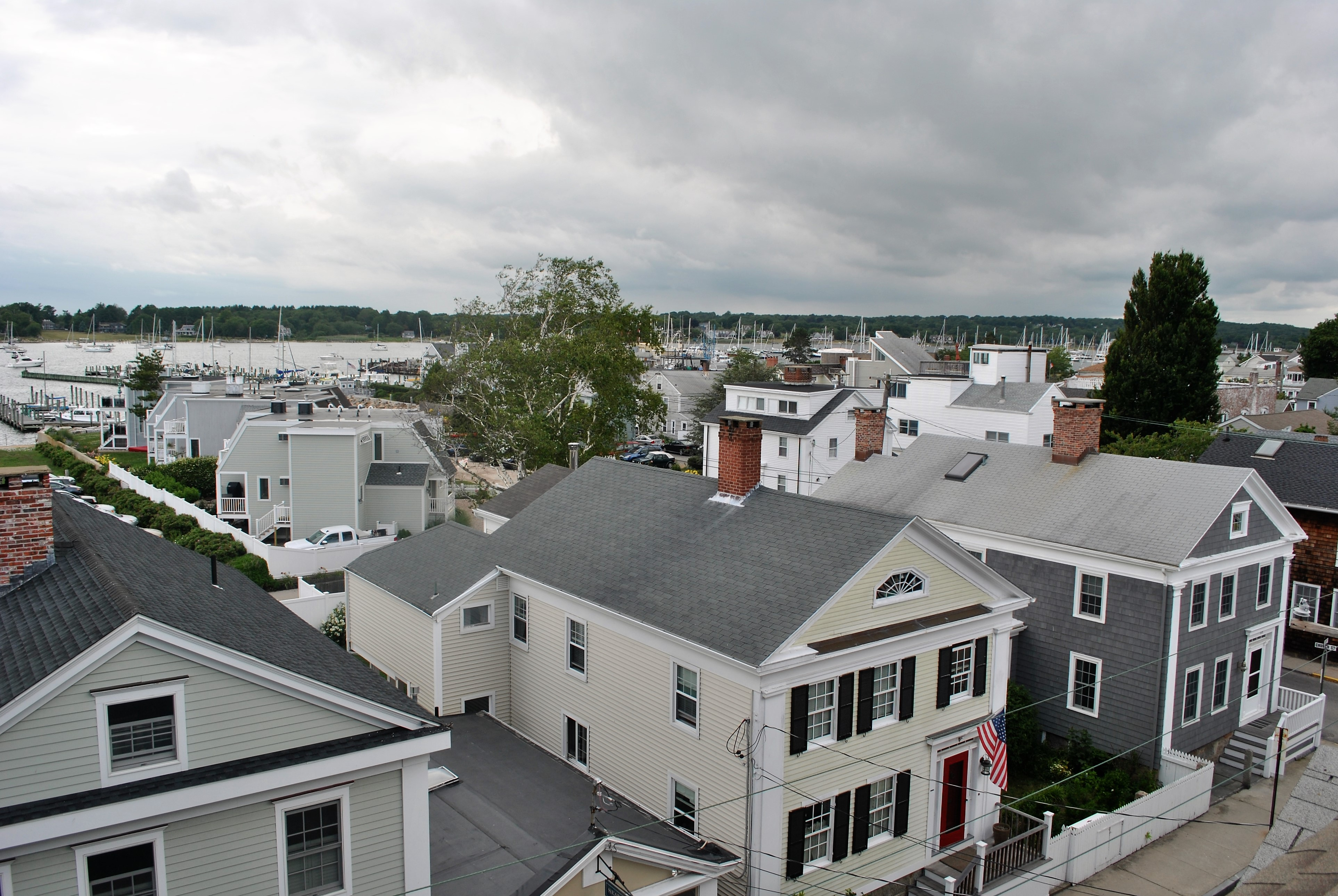
