= Sailors' Snug Harbor of Boston =

Retirement home for sailors

Coordinates: 42.28°N 71.01°W

Sailors' Snug Harbor of Boston was established in 1852 as a retirement home for sailors. It was similar to the much larger Sailors' Snug Harbor on Staten Island. Today, it is a nonprofit organization funding charitable initiatives in fishing communities and for the elderly in eastern Massachusetts.

== History ==
The cornerstone was laid on July 14, 1856. The organization's first president was philanthropist Robert Bennet Forbes, a China-trader and writer. It operated as a retirement home for elderly seamen for many years, first in the Germantown section of Quincy, then in Duxbury before being discontinued in 1971, with the proceeds from the sale of the land going to fund the charitable foundation. In 1949 the National Sailors' Home in Duxbury, which existed from 1891 to 1958, merged with Sailors' Snug Harbor of Boston.

The organization's early records are now deposited with the Massachusetts Historical Society. They include organizational minutes, financial records, photographs, artwork, lists of residents, cemetery records, and assorted correspondence.
