= Houqua (clipper) =

1844 clippership

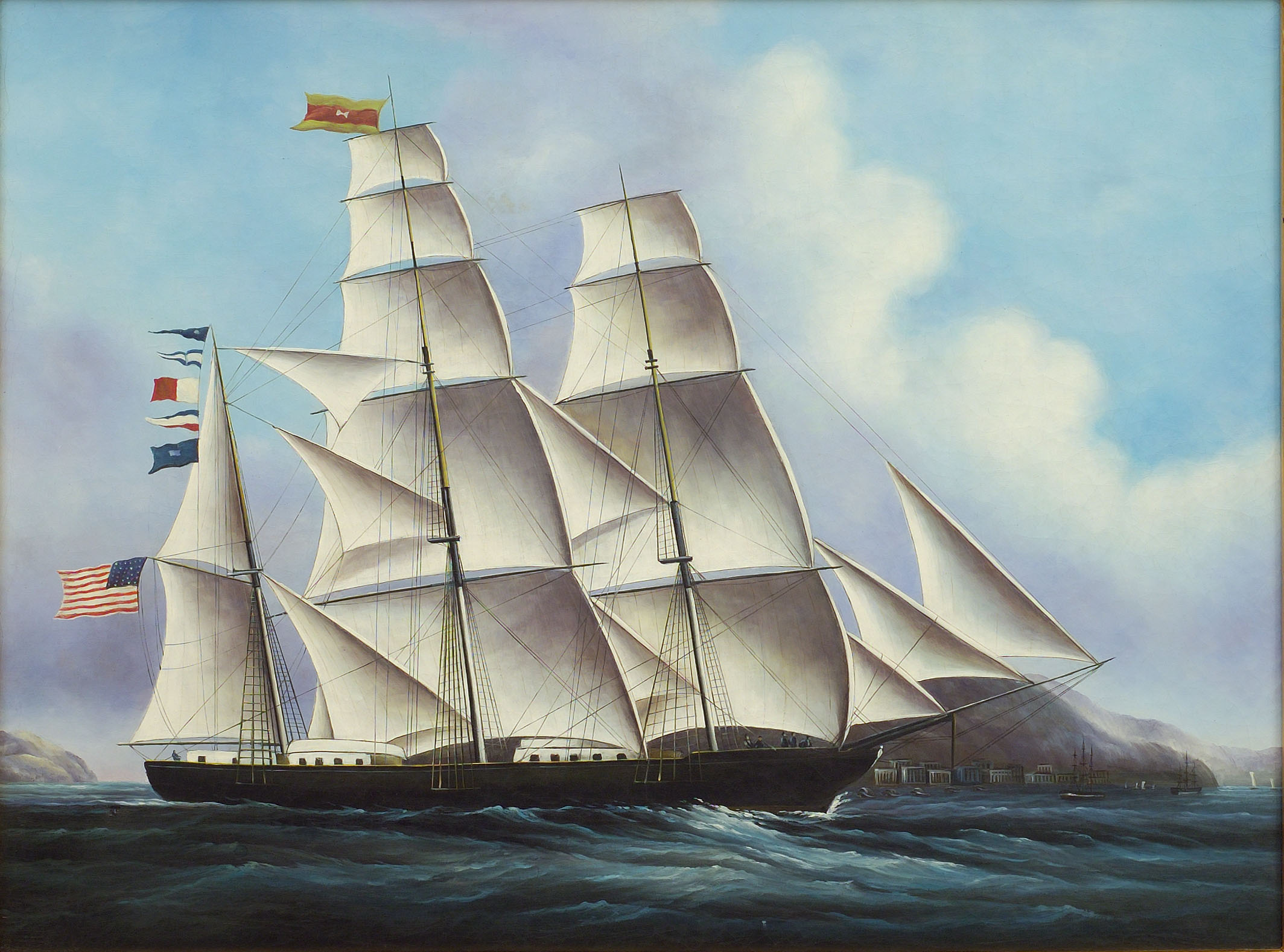
- Houqua c. 1850

History

United States
- Name: Houqua
- Owner: A.A. Low & Brother
- Builder: Brown & Bell, New York City
- Launched: 1844
- Fate: Disappeared, 1864

General characteristics
- Class & type: Clipper
- Tons burthen: 581 tons, OM
- Sail plan: Re-rigged as barque, 1857

Houqua was an early clipper ship with an innovative hull design, built for A.A. Low & Brother in 1844. She sailed in the China trade.

== Name ==
Houqua was named in honor of the Canton Hong merchant Houqua, a long-time trading partner of the Low brothers who had died the year before the ship's launching.

Houqua, (also spelled Howqua or Hoqua), was the most prominent Hong merchant of the day. He "was to take her delivery in China as a warship on behalf of the Chinese government. However, upon arrival, she was found to be too small, and so she spent her career in merchant service for A.A. Low.

== Construction ==
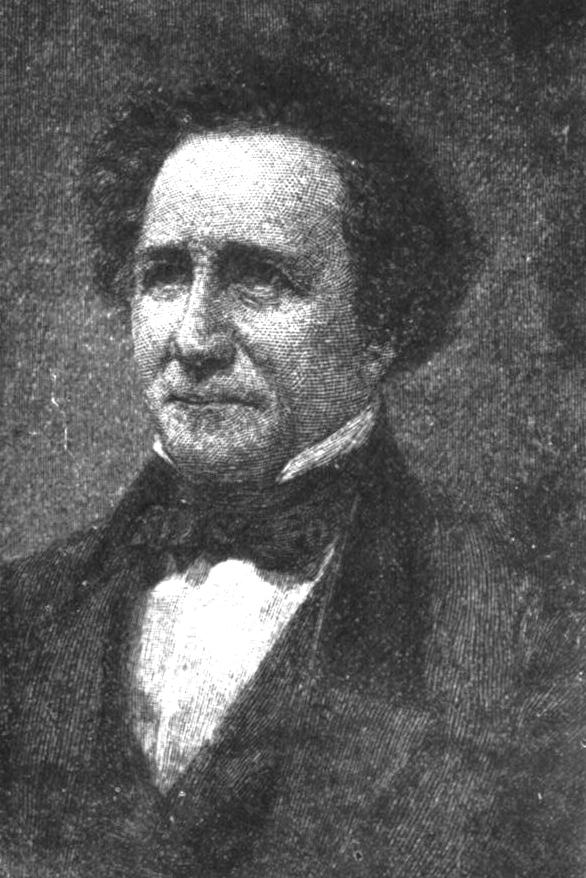
Jacob Bell, of Brown & Bell

The Houqua design combined the practical experience of an experienced sea captain with the mathematical insights of a leading naval architect of the time, John W. Griffiths.

In 1843, the A. A. Low & Bros. representative in Canton, William Low, and his pregnant wife Ann had been passengers on a very slow and frustrating trip home from Canton with Captain Nathaniel Palmer on Paul Jones. "To vent his frustration [Captain Nat] began carving a block of wood into the shape of what he thought the ideal hull of a Canton trader should look like, one that .. 'would outsail anything afloat' ... "He incorporated John W. Griffiths' ideas concerning a sharp concave bow with his own ideas of a fuller flat-bottomed hull."

Upon arrival in New York, they approached A. A. Low & Bros. with the new design, which was further developed and built by David Brown of Brown & Bell shipyard. Captain Nathaniel Palmer "became an advisor to the Lows as a marine superintendent."

== Collision and meteor strike ==
In 1853, the ferry Tonawanda collided with Houqua in the fog in New York Harbor, necessitating repairs before she could set sail for San Francisco.

"Subsequently, off the Horn, on this passage, she had very heavy weather, lying to, off and on, for many days. On May 5th, in a violent squall, a meteor, apparently about the size of a man’s head, broke at the masthead, throwing out the most violent sparks. Coming down the mast it passed to leeward and the two men standing near were sensibly affected and much frightened."

== Disappearance ==
"She sailed from Yokohama, August 15, 1864, for New York, and was thereafter never heard from again. It is assumed she foundered in a tsunami."
