= Stonington Historical Society =

Historical Society in Stonington, Connecticut

Historic Stonington (formerly the Stonington Historical Society) is an organization in Stonington, Connecticut. It was founded in 1895 as "The Stonington Historical and Genealogical Society." The society established a museum at the Stonington Harbor Light in 1925 and since 1995 has run the Capt. Nathaniel B. Palmer House, a U.S. National Historic Landmark. It also operates the R. W. Woolworth Library and Research Center.

== See also ==
- List of historical societies in Connecticut
