= Mudge Passage =

Marine passage

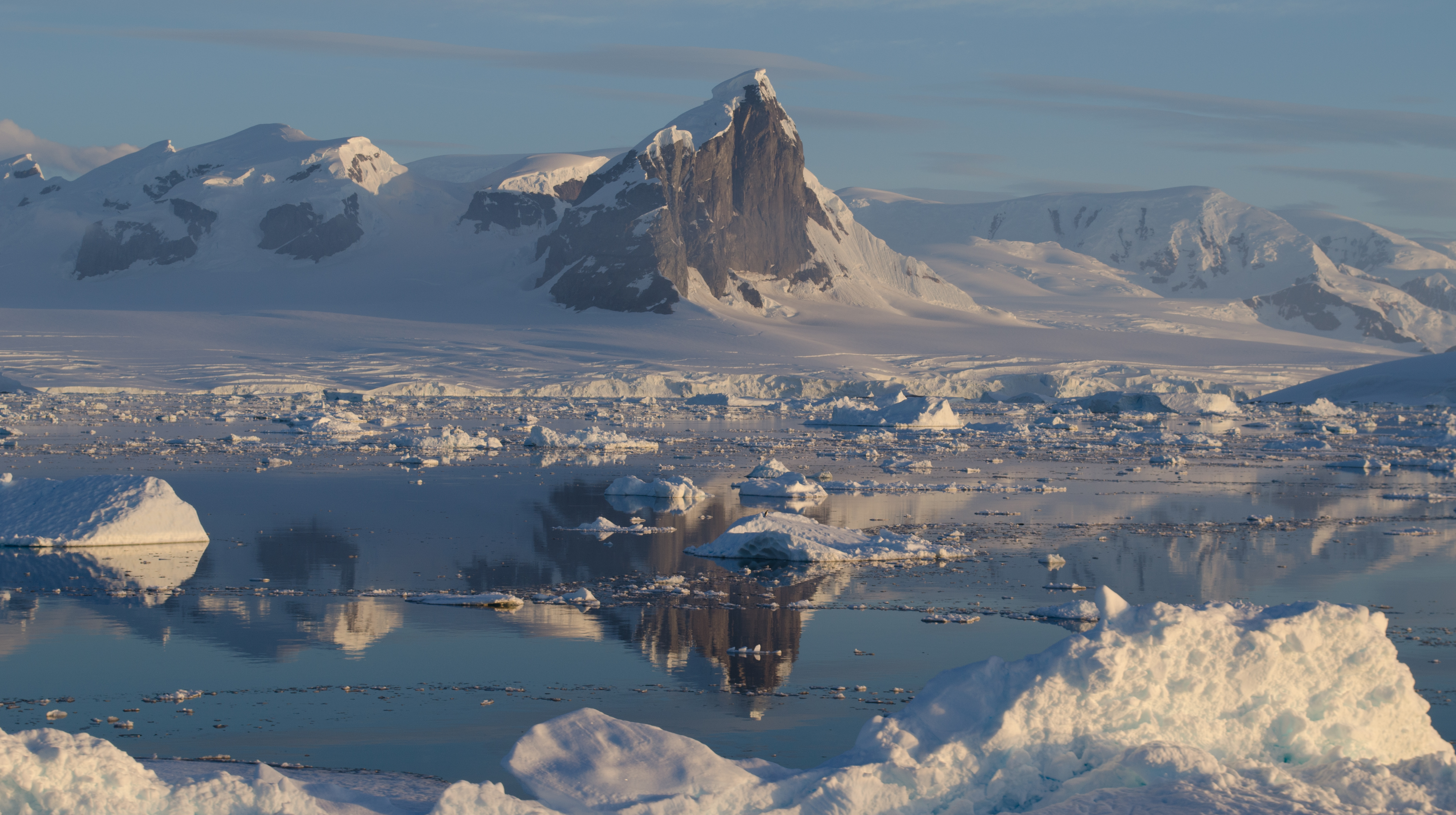
Mudge Passage, January 2013

Mudge Passage (66°2′S 65°50′W) is a marine passage running east–west from the vicinity of Prospect Point, Graham Coast, between Beer Island and Dodman Island to the north and Saffery Islands and Trump Islands to the south, to the vicinity of Extension Reef. The passage was navigated and charted by Captain C.R. Elliott in RRS John Biscoe in January 1979. Named by the United Kingdom Antarctic Place-Names Committee (UK-APC) in association with Harrison Passage and Maskelyne Passage to the northeast, after Thomas Mudge (1715–94), English horologist who made substantial improvements to marine chronometers.
