= Black Head, Antarctica =

Black Head may refer to places in Antarctica:

- Black Head (Graham Land)
- Black Head (South Georgia)

== See also ==
- Black Head
- Blackhead (disambiguation)
