= Vogel =

Vogel may refer to:

== Places ==
- Vogel (lunar crater)
- Vogel (Martian crater)
- 11762 Vogel, a main-belt asteroid
- Vogel (mountain), a mountain of Slovenia
  - Vogel Ski Resort
- Vogel State Park, Georgia, United States
- Vogel Glacier, a glacier of Antarctica
- Vogel Peak, a mountain of South Georgia

== Other uses ==
- Vogel (surname)
- Vogel Awards
  - The Australian/Vogel Literary Award
  - Sir Julius Vogel Award, for New Zealand science fiction and fantasy
- Vogel, the main character in the 1959 novel The Last Valley by J.B. Pick
- Vogel's, a brand of bread sold by Quality Bakers in New Zealand
- Vogel, the German word for bird

== See also ==
- VOGL, debugging software
