= Berntsen Ridge =

Berntsen Ridge (54°9′S 36°43′W) is a ridge on the north coast of South Georgia, running west from Tonsberg Point and rising to about 580 metres (1,900 ft) at the west end. The ridge partly occupies the peninsula between Stromness Harbor and Husvik Harbor. It was named in 1991 by the UK Antarctic Place-Names Committee after Captain Søren Berntsen, a Norwegian whaler who established Husvik whaling station for Tonsberg Hvalfangeri and became its first manager in 1910; later Master of SS Orwell, a whaling factory ship.
