= Marker Rock =

Rock near Turnabout Island, Antarctica

Marker Rock (66°5′S 65°47′W) is a rock lying 1.5 nautical miles (3 km) north-northwest of Turnabout Island in the Saffery Islands, off the west coast of Graham Land, Antarctica. It was charted by the British Graham Land Expedition under John Rymill, 1934–37, and was so named by the UK Antarctic Place-Names Committee in 1959 because it marks the ships' passage through the Saffery Islands.
