= Fringe Rocks =

The Fringe Rocks (66°4′S 65°55′W) are a group of rocks forming the western limit of the Saffery Islands, off the west coast of Graham Land, Antarctica. They were charted by the British Graham Land Expedition under John Rymill, 1934–37, and were so named by the UK Antarctic Place-Names Committee in 1959 because of their position on the fringe of the ships' passage between the Saffery Islands and the Trump Islands. It is one of many named rock formations of Graham Land.
