= Whit Rock =

Whit Rock (66°3′S 65°56′W) is a rock lying between the Trump and Saffery Islands off the west coast of Graham Land. First shown on an Argentine government chart of 1957. Named by the United Kingdom Antarctic Place-Names Committee (UK-APC) in 1959 for its small size, "whit" meaning the smallest part or particle.
