= Beacon Head =

Coordinates: 67°49′S 67°21′W

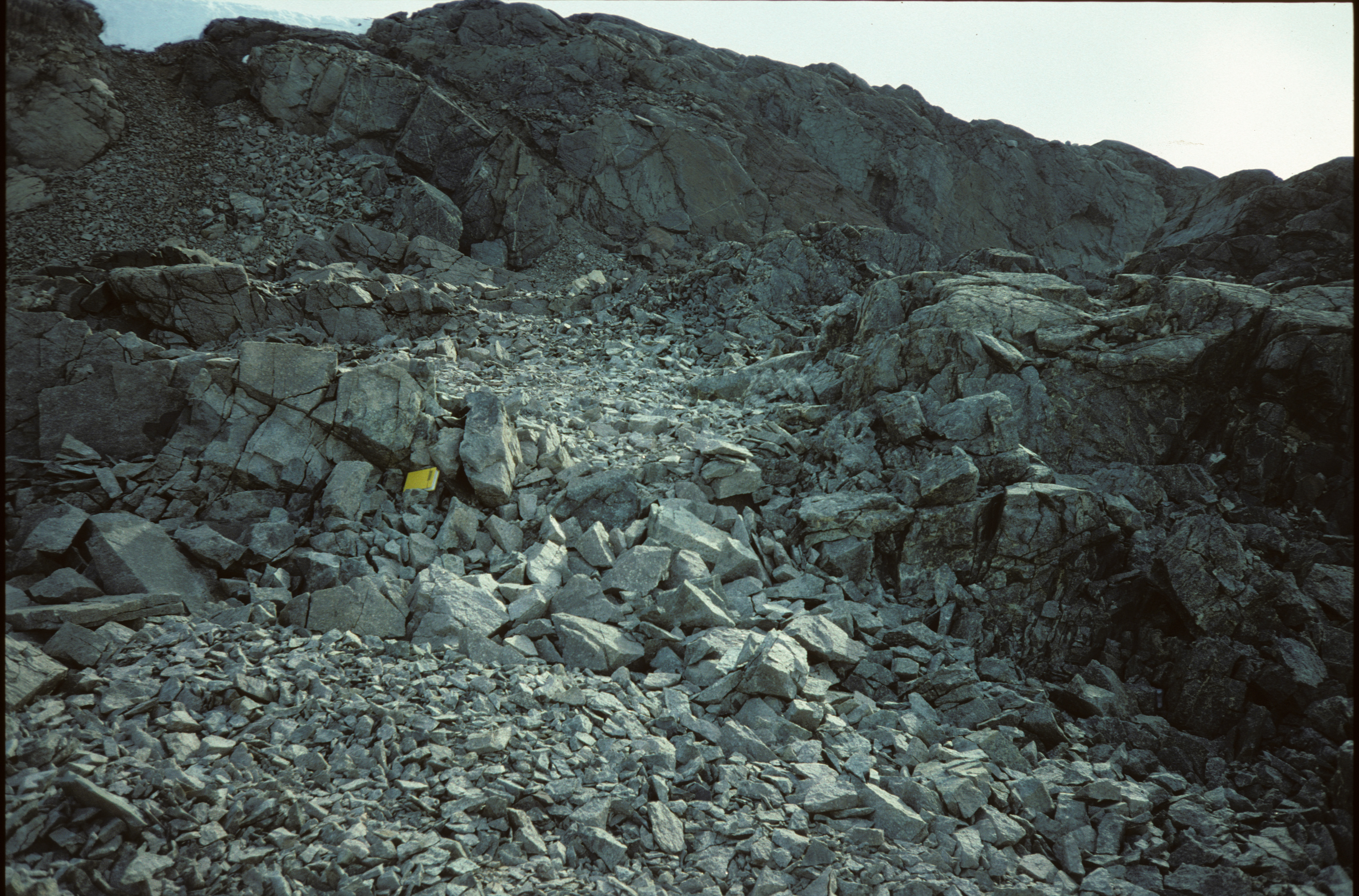
Beacon Head granite

Beacon Head is a small headland at the north side of the entrance to Lystad Bay on Horseshoe Island, off Graham Land. It was so named by the UK Antarctic Place-Names Committee because a timber beacon built on the headland by Argentines was used during the survey on Horseshoe Island by the Falkland Islands Dependencies Survey in 1955–57.
