= Gazella Peak =

Gazella Peak (54°0′S 38°3′W) is a peak rising over 120 metres (390 ft) between Roche Peak and the Cordall Stacks on the north side of Bird Island, South Georgia. It was charted by the South Georgia Survey in the period 1951–57, and was named by the UK Antarctic Place-Names Committee in 1963 after the species name of the Antarctic fur seal (Arctocephalus gazella), which breeds in considerable numbers on Bird Island.
