= Tonkin Island =

Island in Graham Land, Antarctica

Tonkin Island (67°49′S 65°3′W) is a narrow, ice-capped island in Antarctica. It is 3.5 nautical miles (6 km) long in a north-south direction, marked by ice-free peaks at each end, lying 11 nautical miles (20 km) southeast of Choyce Point, Bowman Coast, in Larsen Ice Shelf. The island was discovered and photographed from the air by the United States Antarctic Service (USAS) in 1940. It was charted by the Falkland Islands Dependencies Survey (FIDS) in 1947 and named after John E. Tonkin, FIDS general assistant at Stonington Island, 1945–1947; named Lewis Island by Ronne Antarctic Research Expedition (RARE) following additional aerial photography, 1947. The names Isla Mateo de Toro Zambrano and Isla Riquelme, referring to the north and south parts of this feature shown as two islands, appear on a Chilean hydrographic chart, 1947.

== See also ==
- List of Antarctic and sub-Antarctic islands
