= Lorn =

Lorn may refer to:

== Places ==
- Lorn, New South Wales, a suburb of Maitland, New South Wales, Australia
- Firth of Lorn, body of water off Scotland
- Lorn Rocks, rocks in Antarctica
- An alternate spelling for Lorne, Scotland

== People ==
- Lorn (musician), an American electronic musician
- Lorn Brown (c.1938 - 2010), American sports broadcaster
- Lorn, the mate of Tragg in Tragg and the Sky Gods mid-1970s comic book

== See also ==
- Lorne (disambiguation)
