= Anvil Crag =

Anvil Crag (62°12′S 58°29′W) is a rock crag rising to 300 metres (980 ft) 1 nautical mile (2 km) west-southwest of Sphinx Hill, King George Island. The vertical crag is at the head of a medial moraine. It was descriptively named by the UK Antarctic Place-Names Committee in 1977; with its three rock faces and flat top, it has the appearance of an anvil.
