= Deniau Island =

Island in Graham Land, Antarctica

Deniau Island (65°27′S 64°19′W) is a small island lying midway between Darboux Island and the Lippmann Islands, off the west coast of Graham Land. It was discovered by the French Antarctic Expedition, 1908–10, and named by Jean-Baptiste Charcot for a Monsieur Deniau, a donor of numerous gifts to the expedition.

== See also ==
- List of Antarctic and sub-Antarctic islands
