= Harrison Passage =

Antarctic passage

Harrison Passage (65°53′S 65°11′W) is a passage between Larrouy Island and Tadpole Island to the west, and the Llanquihue Islands and the west coast of Graham Land, Antarctica, to the east. It was photographed by Hunting Aerosurveys Ltd in 1956–57, and was mapped from these photos by the Falkland Islands Dependencies Survey. It was named by the UK Antarctic Place-Names Committee in 1959 for John Harrison, an English horologist who first definitely solved the problem of determining longitude at sea.
