= Turnabout Island =

Turnabout Island may refer to one of the following locations:

- Turnabout Island in Alaska
- Turnabout Island (Antarctica) in the Saffery Islands
- Niushan Dao in the Taiwan Strait
