= Gemel Peaks =

Mountain in King George Island, South Shetland Islands, Antarctica

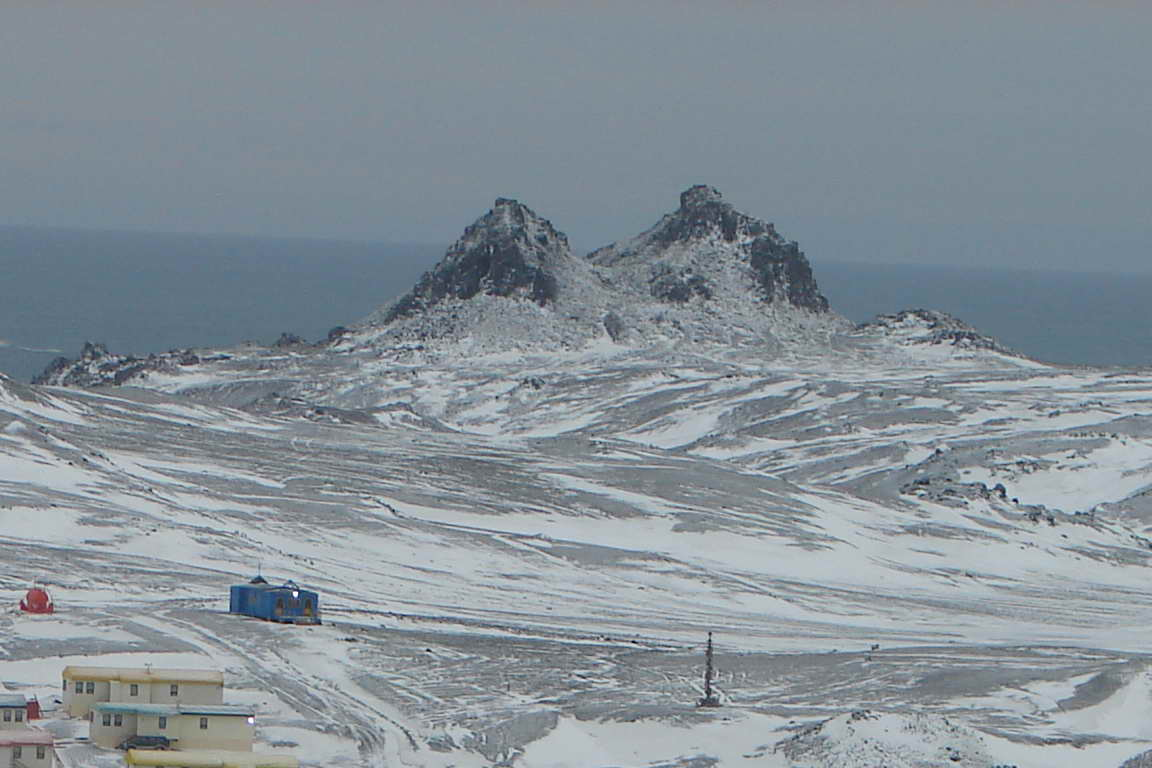
Gemel Peaks

The Gemel Peaks (62°11′42″S 58°59′36″W) are two peaks 1.3 nautical miles (2.4 km) northeast of Horatio Stump on Fildes Peninsula, King George Island, in the South Shetland Islands. They were charted and named "Twin Peak" or "Twin Peaks" by Discovery Investigations personnel on the Discovery II in 1935. To avoid duplication, this name was rejected by the UK Antarctic Place-Names Committee in 1960 and a new name substituted; "Gemel" means twin.
