= Huddle Rocks =

The Huddle Rocks (65°25′S 64°59′W) are a group of rocks lying 1.5 nautical miles (3 km) northwest of the Symington Islands, in the Biscoe Islands of Antarctica. They were mapped by the Falkland Islands Dependencies Survey from photos taken by Hunting Aerosurveys Ltd in 1956–57, and so named by the UK Antarctic Place-Names Committee because of the compact nature of the group.
