= Graae Glacier =

Glacier in Antarctica

- Location within South Georgia Island
- Location: South Georgia
- Coordinates: 54°48′S 36°10′W
- Length: 2 nmi (4 km; 2 mi)
- Thickness: unknown
- Terminus: Trollhul
- Status: unknown

Graae Glacier (54°48′S 36°10′W) is a glacier 2 miles (3 km) long on the north side of Mount Sabatier, flowing west-southwest to Trollhul in the south part of South Georgia. It was surveyed by the South Georgia Survey (SGS) in the period 1951–57, and named by the UK Antarctic Place-Names Committee for Mogens E.W. Graae of Denmark, who developed sledges for the SGS, 1953–54 and 1955–56.

== See also ==
- List of glaciers in the Antarctic
- Glaciology
