= McCollum Peak =

Mountain in Antarctica

McCollum Peak (65°32′S 64°2′W) is a peak, 735 metres (2,410 ft) high, standing south of Beascochea Bay 2 nautical miles (4 km) southeast of Mount Waugh, on the west coast of Graham Land, Antarctica. It was first charted by the Fourth French Antarctic Expedition under Jean-Baptiste Charcot, 1908–10, and was named by the UK Antarctic Place-Names Committee in 1959 for Elmer V. McCollum, an American biochemist who first isolated vitamins A and B, in 1915.
