= Deniau =

Deniau is a French surname. Notable people with the surname include:

- François Deniau (1936–2014), French Roman Catholic bishop
- Jean-François Deniau (1928–2007), French diplomat and writer

== See also ==
- Deniau Island, island of Graham Land, Antarctica
