= Landing Cove =

Landing Cove (60°44′S 45°41′W) is a cove north of Conroy Point on the northwest side of Moe Island in the South Orkney Islands, Antarctica. It was so named by the UK Antarctic Place-Names Committee because the cove provides the only possible landing place for small boats on the island.
