= Bordal Rock =

Bordal Rock (54°49′S 36°14′W) is an isolated rock 1.5 nautical miles (3 km) west-southwest of Trollhul, off the south coast of South Georgia. Positioned by the South Georgia Survey in the period 1951–57, it was named by the UK Antarctic Place-Names Committee for Harald Bordal, a gunner of the Compañía Argentina de Pesca, Grytviken, for several years beginning in 1948.
