= Knuckle Reef =

Knuckle Reef (67°50′S 67°22′W) is a reef lying off Beacon Head, Horseshoe Island, Antarctica. The reef was so named by the UK Antarctic Place-Names Committee in 1958 because the individual rocks in the reef, which are exposed at low tide, resemble the knuckles of a clenched fist.
