= Waugh (disambiguation) =

Waugh is a surname.

Waugh may also refer to:

- Mount Waugh, Antarctica
- Waugh Peak, Antarctica
- Waugh, Alabama, an unincorporated community
- Waugh, Indiana, an unincorporated community in the United States
- Waugh Mountain, Colorado
