= Fleet Point =

Fleet Point (67°37′S 65°24′W) is a rocky point 4 nautical miles (7 km) northwest of Tent Nunatak on the east coast of Graham Land, Antarctica. The point has a rocky spine ranging from 260 to 870 metres (850 to 2,850 ft) in height. The point appears in the aerial photographs of several American expeditions: United States Antarctic Service, 1939–41; Ronne Antarctic Research Expedition, 1947–48; U.S. Navy photos, 1968. It was mapped by the British Antarctic Survey (BAS) 1963–64, and was named by the UK Antarctic Place-Names Committee for Michael Fleet, Geologist with the BAS Larsen Ice Shelf party, 1963–64.
