= Choyce Point =

Choyce Point (67°42′S 65°23′W) is a headland 3 nautical miles (6 km) southwest of Tent Nunatak on the east coast of Graham Land. A rocky bluff rises behind the point as viewed from Larsen Ice Shelf to which the Falkland Islands Dependencies Survey (FIDS) in 1947 applied the name Cape Choyce. The name was amended to Choyce Point in 1975 and reapplied to this point which is of geological significance and rises 230 metres (750 ft) above the ice shelf. It was named by the UK Antarctic Place-Names Committee for M.A. Choyce, FIDS meteorologist at Hope Bay, 1947.
