= Blechnum Peaks =

Blechnum Peaks (54°12′S 36°43′W) are three peaks, the highest 640 metres (2,100 ft) high, on the north–south ridge between Gulbrandsen Lake and Olsen Valley on the north coast of South Georgia. They were named by the UK Antarctic Place-Names Committee, following British Antarctic Survey biological work in the area, after the rare fern Blechnum penna-marina, whose occurrence in South Georgia is known only from the north and east slopes of these peaks and from the adjacent Olsen Valley.
