= Fielding Col =

Fielding Col (68°52′S 66°59′W) is an east–west trending pass between the Baudin Peaks and Hag Pike in southern Graham Land, Antarctica. It provides the best known route leading inland to Morgan Upland between Neny Fjord and the Wordie Ice Shelf. It was named by the UK Antarctic Place-Names Committee after Harold M. Fielding, a British Antarctic Survey surveyor at Stonington Island, 1967–69.
