= Maskelyne Passage =

Passage off the coast of Antarctica

Maskelyne Passage (65°50′S 65°24′W) is a passage between Larrouy Island and Tadpole Island to the east, and Cat Island, Runnelstone Rock and Hummock Island to the west, off the west coast of Graham Land, Antarctica. It was photographed by Hunting Aerosurveys Ltd in 1956–57, and mapped from these photos by the Falkland Islands Dependencies Survey. It was named by the UK Antarctic Place-Names Committee in 1959 for Englishman Nevil Maskelyne, Astronomer Royal for many years till his death in 1811, who started The Nautical Almanac in 1767.
