= Breccia Crags =

The Breccia Crags (60°42′S 45°13′W) are rock crags, 305 metres (1,000 ft) high, standing 1 nautical mile (2 km) west of Petter Bay in the southeast end of Coronation Island, in the South Orkney Islands in the Southern Ocean.

They were named by the UK Antarctic Place-Names Committee following the 1956–1958 survey by the Falkland Islands Dependencies Survey. The feature is of geological interest owing to the contact of brecciated schist (breccia) and conglomerate.
