= Cauldron Pool =

Hot, brackish steaming pond in northwest Candlemas Island, South Sandwich Islands

Cauldron Pool (57°4′S 26°43′W) is a hot, brackish steaming pond located east of Tow Bay and below the west slopes of the volcanically active Lucifer Hill, in northwest Candlemas Island, South Sandwich Islands. The descriptive name, suggestive of a cauldron, was applied by the UK Antarctic Place-Names Committee in 1971.
