= Symington Islands =

Symington Islands (65°27′S 64°58′W) is a group of small islands lying 21 km (13 mi) west-northwest of Lahille Island, in the Biscoe Islands. Charted by the British Graham Land Expedition (BGLE) under Rymill, 1934–37. Named by the United Kingdom Antarctic Place-Names Committee (UK-APC) in 1959 for J.D.L. Symington, senior air photographer of the Falkland Islands and Dependencies Aerial Survey Expedition (FIDASE) in this area in 1956–57.

== See also ==
- List of Antarctic and sub-Antarctic islands
