= Hektor Icefall =

Icefall in the South Shetland Islands

Hektor Icefall (62°0′S 57°48′W) is an icefall extending in an arc about 5 nautical miles (9 km) long at the head of Sherratt Bay, on the south coast of King George Island in the South Shetland Islands. It was named by the UK Antarctic Place-Names Committee in 1960 for the Hektor Whaling Company which operated the land station at Deception Island from 1912 to 1931, and worked chiefly in the waters of the South Shetland Islands.
