= Cabrial Rock =

Cabrial Rock (54°19′S 36°14′W) is a rock lying at the north side of the entrance to Ocean Harbor, South Georgia. It was positioned by the South Georgia Survey in the period 1951–1957. The rock was named by the UK Antarctic Place-Names Committee for Frank Cabrial, steward on the American brig Frances Alan of New London, Connecticut, who was drowned on October 14, 1820; there is a grave marked by a wooden cross recording this in Ocean Harbor.
