= No. 541 Squadron RAF =

Defunct flying squadron of the Royal Air Force

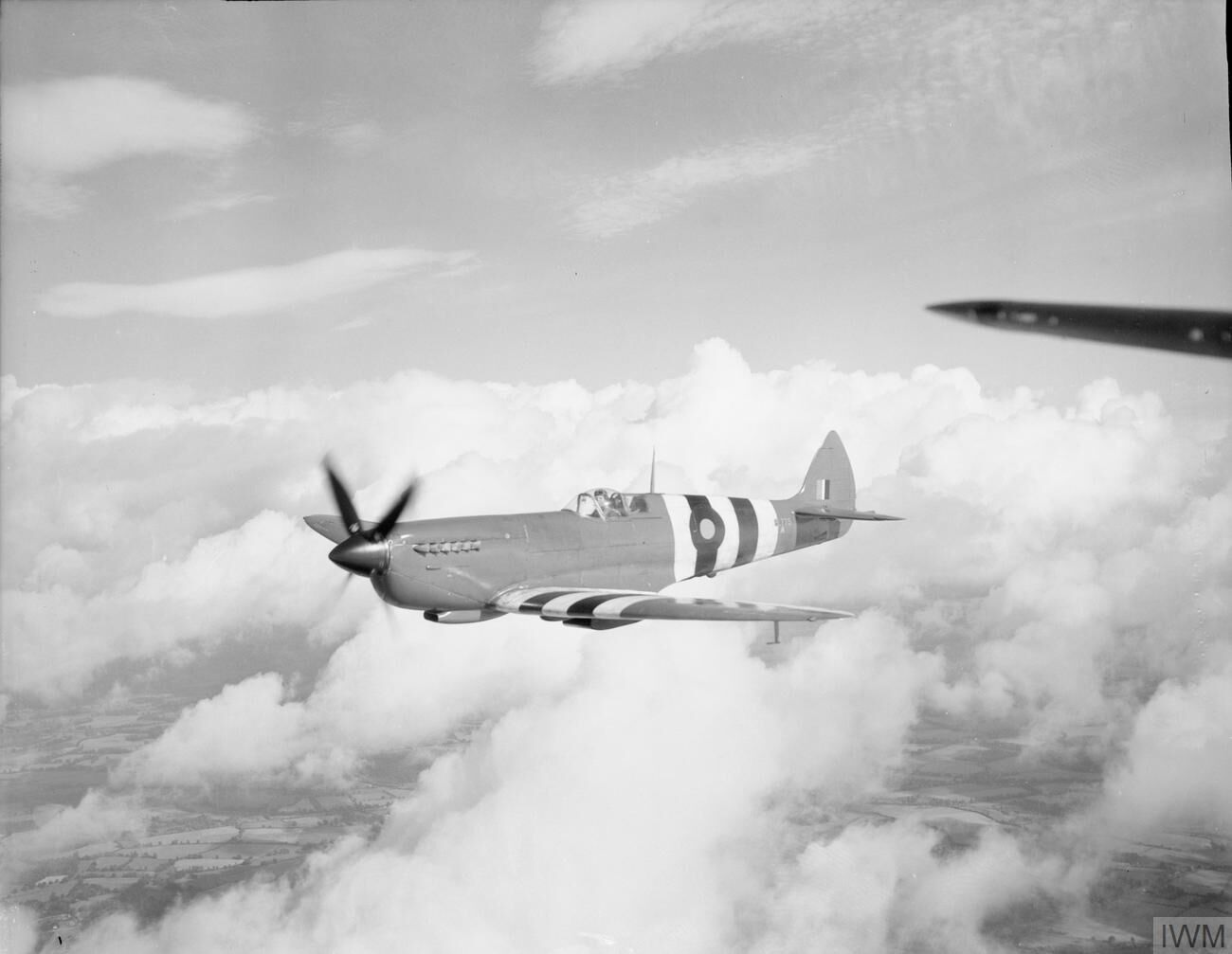
- Spitfire PR Mark XI, PL775, of No. 541 Squadron RAF
- Active: 19 October 1942 – 1 October 1946; 1 November 1947 – 7 September 1957
- Country: United Kingdom
- Branch: Royal Air Force
- Motto: Alone above all

Insignia
- Squadron Badge: A birds eye speedwell flower
- Squadron Code: ES (October 1945 – Dec 1946); WY (November 1947 –1951); A (1951 –1954)

No. 541 Squadron RAF was a Royal Air Force Squadron formed as a photographic reconnaissance squadron in World War II.

== History ==
=== Formation in World War II ===
The squadron formed at RAF Benson on 19 October 1942 from 'B' and 'F' flights of No. 1 PRU, and was equipped with Spitfires to fly missions over Europe. It also received Mustang aircraft in July 1944 and operated some Lancaster bombers for UK mapping purposes after hostilities ceased. One of the squadrons first commanders following its formation was John Saffery.

Wartime detachments operated from Gibraltar in 1943, providing imagery of North Africa, and from RAF Leuchars in the same year with missions flown into Norway looking for the battleship Scharnhorst.

It disbanded in October 1946, with the Lancaster Flight becoming No. 82 Squadron.

=== Postwar ===
The squadron reformed at RAF Benson on 1 November 1947, and in December 1950 its Spitfires were replaced with Meteors which it operated from RAF Bückeburg, RAF Laarbruch and RAF Gütersloh before it disbanded again on 7 September 1957.

== Aircraft operated ==
Aircraft operated by No. 541 Squadron RAF
From	To	Aircraft	Variant
Oct 1942	Jan 1943	Supermarine Spitfire	D
Oct 1942	Sep 1944	Supermarine Spitfire	IV
Nov 1942	Dec 1942	Supermarine Spitfire	IX
Dec 1942	Mar 1946	Supermarine Spitfire	XI
May 1944	Apr 1945	Supermarine Spitfire	X
Jun 1944	Oct 1946	Supermarine Spitfire	XIX
Dec 1942	Mar 1946	Supermarine Spitfire	XI
Jul 1944	Jun 1945	North American P-51 Mustang	III
Oct 1945	Apr 1946	Gloster Meteor	F.3
Feb 1946	Oct 1946	Avro Lancaster	PR1
Nov 1947	May 1951	Supermarine Spitfire	PR 19
Dec 1950	Sep 1957	Gloster Meteor	PR 10
