= Marikoppa =

Marikoppa (54°19′00″S 36°42′00″W) is a mountain, 1,840 metres (6,040 ft), between Larssen and Paulsen Peak in the Allardyce Range of South Georgia. The name, which is known locally, was used in 1950 by H.B. Paulsen. Koppa is a descriptive Finnish word meaning "basket with a lid on top." The mountain was surveyed by the South Georgia Survey in 1951–52.
