= Corelli Horn =

Corelli Horn (70°42′S 69°49′W) is a prominent rocky pinnacle with a distinctive pointed summit, 1,000 metres (3,300 ft) high, standing 4 nautical miles (7 km) west of the north end of the LeMay Range in central Alexander Island, Antarctica. It was first mapped in 1960 by D. Searle of the Falkland Islands Dependencies Survey, from air photos obtained by the Ronne Antarctic Research Expedition in 1947–48. It was named by the UK Antarctic Place-Names Committee for Arcangelo Corelli, the Italian composer (1653–1713)
