= Canis Heights =

Coordinates: 70°26′S 66°19′W

Canis Heights is a mainly snow-covered ridge located between the two upper tributaries of Millett Glacier on the western edge of the Dyer Plateau of Palmer Land. The feature was named by the UK Antarctic Place-Names Committee after the constellations of Canis Major and Canis Minor.
