= Horatio Stump =

Horatio Stump (62°12′47″S 59°00′21″W) is a flat-topped hill, 165 metres (540 ft) high, lying immediately east of Flat Top Peninsula at the southwest end of King George Island in the South Shetland Islands. It was named by the UK Antarctic Place-Names Committee in 1960 for the sealing vessel Horatio (Captain Weeks) from London, which visited the South Shetland Islands in 1820–21.
