= Hospital Point =

Hospital Point (62°32′S 59°47′W) is a point formed by an ice cliff with a small amount of rock exposed at its base, lying at the north side of Yankee Harbour immediately east of Glacier Bluff, Greenwich Island, in the South Shetland Islands. It was charted and named "Rocky Point" by Discovery Investigations personnel on the Discovery II in 1935. In order to avoid duplication the UK Antarctic Place-Names Committee rejected this name in 1961 and substituted a new one. Hospital Point derives from "Hospital Cove", a name for Yankee Harbour in common use among British sealers in the 1820s and British whalers in the 1920s.
