= Capstan Rocks =

Group of rocks in Antarctica

The Capstan Rocks (64°57′S 63°26′W) are a small group of rocks, sometimes awash at high water and in strong winds, lying 1 nautical mile (2 km) south of Bob Island in the south entrance to Gerlache Strait, off the west coast of Graham Land. They were shown on an Argentine government chart of 1950, but not named. They were surveyed by the British Naval Hydrographic Survey Unit, 1956–57, and given this descriptive name by the UK Antarctic Place-Names Committee, because of a supposed resemblance to a capstan. It is one of many named Rock formations of Graham Land.
