= Gulbrandsen Lake =

Lake in South Georgia

- Location within South Georgia Island
- Location: South Georgia
- Coordinates: 54°12′56″S 36°44′24″W
- Basin countries: (South Georgia)
- Max. length: 0.5 mi (0.8 km)

Gulbrandsen Lake is a lake 0.5 miles (0.8 km) long lying north of Neumayer Glacier in South Georgia. It is now an empty basin; the moraine and or ice dam formed by the Neumeyer Glacier no longer contains this lake. It was charted and named "White City" by the British expedition under Ernest Shackleton, 1921–22, but this name is considered unsuitable and has never been used locally. Gulbrandsen Lake was named by the UK Antarctic Place-Names Committee in 1957 for Gunnar Gulbrandsen, a pattern-maker at the Compañía Argentina de Pesca station at Grytviken, 1927–30, carpenter at Stromness, 1945–46, and variously carpenter, dock foreman, dockmaster, and junior officer at the South Georgia Whaling Company station, Leith Harbour, for several years beginning in 1946.
