= Freberg Rocks =

The Freberg Rocks (54°30′S 36°42′W) are a small group of rocks lying off Rocky Bay, 1.5 nautical miles (3 km) west-northwest of Ducloz Head, South Georgia. They were surveyed by the South Georgia Survey in the period 1951–57, and were named by the UK Antarctic Place-Names Committee for Hjalmar Freberg, a gunner of the Tonsberg Hvalfangeri, Husvik, 1946–54.
