= Menelaus Ridge =

Menelaus Ridge (64°35′S 63°40′W) is a snow-covered ridge having four small summits at about 1,370 metres (4,500 ft), between Mount Agamemnon and Mount Helen in the Achaean Range of central Anvers Island, in the Palmer Archipelago, Antarctica. It was surveyed in 1955 by the Falkland Islands Dependencies Survey, and was named by the UK Antarctic Place-Names Committee, in association with other names in the area, for Menelaus, husband of Helen and younger brother of Agamemnon in Homer's Iliad.
