= Buddington Peak =

Mountain in Antarctica

Buddington Peak (62°11′45″S 58°47′43″W) is a peak rising between Collins Harbor and Marian Cove in the southwest part of King George Island, in the South Shetland Islands. It was named by the UK Antarctic Place-Names Committee in 1960 for James W. Buddington of New London, Connecticut, who visited the South Shetland Islands in 1876–77, 1888–89 and 1889–90, in search of fur seals. Buddington was a leading figure during the revival of United States southern sealing which began in 1871.
