= Cuthbertson Snowfield =

Cuthbertson Snowfield (60°42′S 44°30′W) is a snowfield rising to 340 metres (1,120 ft) and covering the high ground of eastern Laurie Island (eastward of Watson Peninsula), in the South Orkney Islands. It was named by the UK Antarctic Place-Names Committee in 1987 after William Cuthbertson, the artist on the Scottish National Antarctic Expedition, led by W.S. Bruce, which wintered on Laurie Island in 1903.
