= Davies Heights =

Elevated area on King George Island, Antarctica

The Davies Heights (62°10′53″S 58°56′23″W) are an elevated area, roughly elliptical in form and 1 nautical mile (2 km) long, rising to 150 metres (500 ft) in north-central Fildes Peninsula, King George Island. The feature has steep sides and an undulating top which rise 60 metres (200 ft) above the surrounding plain. It was named by the UK Antarctic Place-Names Committee for Robert E.S. Davies, British Antarctic Survey geologist who worked in this area, 1975–76.
