= Basilisk Crag =

Cliff in the South Shetland Islands

Coordinates: 62°28′16″S 60°8′29″W

Basilisk Crag is a linear serrated cliff in the South Shetland Islands. It trends north-east, rising to about 70 metres (230 ft) above sea level on the southeast shore of Griffin Cove, Livingston Island. The cliff is one of several features given the name of “fabulous beasts” in the Williams Point area. It was named by the UK Antarctic Place-Names Committee in 1998 after the Basilisk, reputed "king of the serpents", and also because the feature was thought to crudely resemble the modern-day basilisk lizard.
