= Dikstra Buttresses =

The Dikstra Buttresses (69°48′S 69°53′W) are a group of summits rising to about 1,500 metres (5,000 ft) on the western side of the Douglas Range, northern Alexander Island, Antarctica. Surveyed by the British Antarctic Survey (BAS), 1975–76, they were named by the UK Antarctic Place-Names Committee in 1980 after Barry James Dikstra, a BAS geophysicist at Adelaide Island and Rothera Station, 1974–77.
