= Burton Cove =

Burton Cove (54°1′S 38°4′W) is a small cove just east of Pearson Point, the southwest tip of Bird Island, South Georgia. It was named by the UK Antarctic Place-Names Committee for Robert W. Burton, British Antarctic Survey assistant in fur seal investigations on Bird Island, 1971–72.
