= Buzfuz Rock =

Place in Antarctica

Buzfuz Rock (65°28′S 65°53′W) is a rock 1.5 nautical miles (3 km) west of Snubbin Island in the Pitt Islands, northern Biscoe Islands. It was named by the UK Antarctic Place-Names Committee in 1971 after Sergeant Buzfuz, a character in Charles Dickens' The Pickwick Papers.
