= Miller Heights =

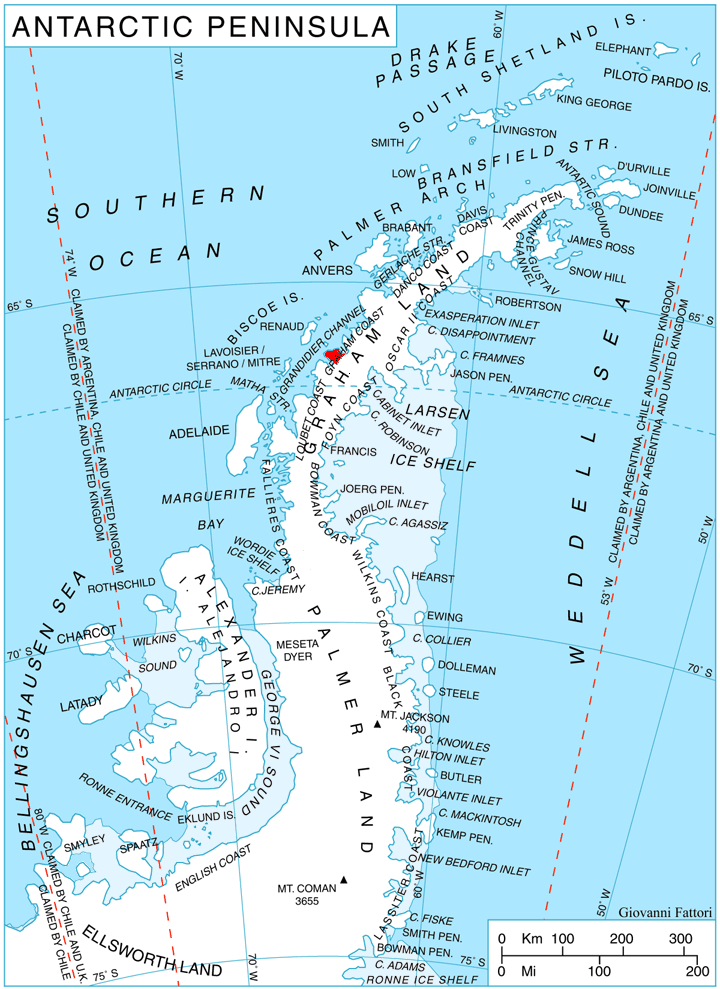
Location of Velingrad Peninsula on Graham Coast, Antarctic Peninsula.

The Miller Heights (66°1′S 65°14′W) are a series of elevations extending eastward from Sharp Peak on Velingrad Peninsula, Graham Coast on the west side of Graham Land, Antarctica. The feature was roughly charted by the British Graham Land Expedition under John Rymill, 1934–37, and was named by the UK Antarctic Place-Names Committee for Ronald Miller, a Falkland Islands Dependencies Survey general assistant at Detaille Island in 1956 and leader at Prospect Point in 1957.
