= Haller Rocks =

Group of rocks in Palmer Archipelago, Antarctica

The Haller Rocks (64°4′S 62°6′W) are a small group of rocks in the eastern part of Bouquet Bay, lying 2 nautical miles (4 km) northwest of the southwest end of Liège Island, in the Palmer Archipelago, Antarctica. They were photographed by Hunting Aerosurveys Ltd in 1956–57, and mapped from these photos in 1959. They were named by the UK Antarctic Place-Names Committee for Albrecht von Haller, a Swiss physiologist who made important contributions to medical knowledge, for example, mechanism of heartbeat, action of bile.
