= Homing Head =

Homing Head (67°48′S 67°16′W) is a headland at the northeast side of Sally Cove on Horseshoe Island, off Graham Land, Antarctica. It was named by UK Antarctic Place-Names Committee in 1958; the name arose because this conspicuous black headland, formed by sheer cliffs 60 metres (200 ft) high, was treated as an objective by the Falkland Islands Dependencies Survey sledging parties returning to the Horseshoe Island station.
