= Conroy Point =

Conroy Point (60°44′S 45°41′W) is a headland midway along the northwest side of Moe Island in the South Orkney Islands. It was named by the UK Antarctic Place-Names Committee after James W.H. Conroy, ornithologist on Signy Island, 1967–68.
