= Larssen Peak =

Mountain on the island of South Georgia

Larssen Peak (54°19′S 36°46′W) is a peak, 1,550 metres (5,100 ft) high, between the Three Brothers and Marikoppa in the Allardyce Range of South Georgia. It was surveyed by the South Georgia Survey in the period 1951–57, and named by the UK Antarctic Place-Names Committee for Harald Larssen, manager at the Compañía Argentina de Pesca station, Grytviken, 1951–54.
