= Lawrence Channel =

Lawrence Channel (67°21′S 67°35′W) is a marine channel in Laubeuf Fjord, running north–south between Wyatt Island and Arrowsmith Peninsula, Loubet Coast, Antarctica. It was named by the UK Antarctic Place-Names Committee in 1984 after Captain Stuart J. Lawrence, Master of the British Antarctic Survey ship Bransfield for some years from 1974.
