= Molnar Rocks =

The Molnar Rocks (66°11′S 66°58′W) are insular rocks lying 4 nautical miles (7 km) west of the middle of Lavoisier Island, in the Biscoe Islands of Antarctica. The rocks were mapped from air photos taken by the Falkland Islands and Dependencies Aerial Survey Expedition in 1956–57, and were named by the UK Antarctic Place-Names Committee for George W. Molnar, an American physiologist who has specialized in the reactions of the body to cold environments.
