= Cordall Stacks =

Two rock stacks at South Georgia

The Cordall Stacks (54°0′S 38°4′W) are two conspicuous rock stacks, the eastern one joined to Bird Island, South Georgia, by a low isthmus, lying on the northwest side of the island 0.3 nautical miles (0.6 km) northwest of Jordan Cove. They were named by the UK Antarctic Place-Names Committee for Peter A. Cordall, a member of the South Georgia Biological Expedition, 1958–59, who made a plane table survey of Bird Island.
