= Turnabout Island, Antarctica =

Island in Antarctica

Turnabout Island (66°6′S 65°45′W) is a snow-capped island in the Saffery Islands, lying 2 nautical miles (3.7 km) southwest of Black Head, off the west coast of Graham Land. Discovered and named by the British Graham Land Expedition (BGLE), 1934–37, under John Rymill. It is so named because it represents the turning point on a BGLE sledge journey in August 1935 when open water was encountered southwest of this island.

== See also ==
- List of Antarctic and sub-Antarctic islands
