= Bernard Rocks =

Group of rocks off Brabant Island, Antarctica

Bernard Rocks (64°8′S 62°1′W) is a small group of rocks between Davis Island and Spallanzani Point, off the northeast side of Brabant Island in the Palmer Archipelago. They were first mapped by the French Antarctic Expedition, 1903–05, under Jean-Baptiste Charcot, photographed by Hunting Aerosurveys Ltd in 1956–57, and mapped from these photos in 1959. They were named by the UK Antarctic Place-Names Committee for Claude Bernard, French physiologist who made important contributions to the understanding of digestion, function of the liver and the methods of experimental medicine.
