= Kjellstrøm Rock =

Georgian rock

Kjellstrøm Rock (54°16′S 37°26′W) is a rock lying 0.5 nautical miles (1 km) northwest of Cape Nuñez, off the south coast of South Georgia. It was surveyed by the South Georgia Survey in the period 1951–57, and named by the UK Antarctic Place-Names Committee for Johan Kjellstrøm, a gunner of the Compañía Argentina de Pesca, Grytviken, 1943–50, and of the South Georgia Whaling Co, Leith Harbour, 1950–55.
