= Diver Point =

Diver Point (54°0′S 38°3′W) is a point midway along the north shore of Bird Island, South Georgia. The name, by the UK Antarctic Place-Names Committee, derives from the South Georgia diving petrel (Pelecanoides georgicus) which nests nearby.
