= Husdal =

Valley in South Georgia

Husdal (54°11′S 36°43′W) is a short valley running west-southwest from the head of Husvik Harbour, South Georgia. It was named by the UK Antarctic Place-Names Committee in the Norwegian form "Husdal" (house valley) in association with the disused Husvik whaling station at the head of Husvik Harbour.
