= Fulmar Bay =

Bay in the South Orkney Islands

Fulmar Bay (60°37′S 46°1′W) is a bay 1 nautical mile (2 km) wide between Moreton Point and Return Point at the west end of Coronation Island, in the South Orkney Islands. It was first sighted and roughly charted by Captain George Powell and Captain Nathaniel Palmer on their joint cruise in December 1821. It was surveyed in 1933 by Discovery Investigations personnel, and so named in 1954 by the UK Antarctic Place-Names Committee because large numbers of Antarctic Fulmars (Fulmarus glacialoides) nest in this area.
