= Humpback Rocks =

Humpback Rocks (54°7′S 36°38′W) is a small group of rocks lying 0.25 nautical miles (0.5 km) north of Cape Saunders, off the north coast of South Georgia. The South Georgia Survey reported in 1951–52 that the descriptive name "Knolrokset" (humpback rocks) has been used for this feature by the whalers and sealers at South Georgia. An English form of the name, Humpback Rocks, was recommended by the UK Antarctic Place-Names Committee in 1954.
