= Lippmann Islands =

Island group in Antarctica

- Location within Antarctica

Geography
- Location: Antarctica
- Coordinates: 65°30′S 64°26′W

Administration
- Administered under the Antarctic Treaty System

Demographics
- Population: Uninhabited

The Lippmann Islands are a group of small islands 4 kilometres (2 nmi) in extent, lying close northwest of Lahille Island off the west coast of Graham Land, Antarctica. They were originally mapped as a single island by the French Antarctic Expedition, 1903–05, under Jean-Baptiste Charcot, and named by him for French physicist and Nobel Prize winner Gabriel Lippmann.

== See also ==
- List of Antarctic and sub-Antarctic islands
