= Bothy Bay =

Bothy Bay (62°10′19″S 58°58′34″W) is a small bay on the northwest side of Fildes Peninsula, King George Island. The entrance is 0.7 nautical miles (1.3 km) southeast of Square End Island and the bay is backed by a wide beach, with low cliffs on the northeast and southwest sides. The name, applied by the UK Antarctic Place-Names Committee in 1977, is suggested by a crude stone hut ("bothy"), evidently built by nineteenth-century sealers, on the shore of the bay.
