= Mackworth Rock =

Mackworth Rock (66°2′S 66°34′W) is an insular rock in Pendleton Strait, Antarctica, about 2 nautical miles (4 km) north of Cape Leblond, Lavoisier Island. It was mapped from air photos taken by the Falkland Islands and Dependencies Aerial Survey Expedition (1956–57), and was named by the UK Antarctic Place-Names Committee for Norman H. Mackworth, a British experimental psychologist who in 1953 first demonstrated beyond doubt that people acclimatize to cold.
