= Geelan Ice Piedmont =

Geelan Ice Piedmont (69°29′S 72°41′W) is an ice piedmont forming the northern end of Rothschild Island, off the coast of Antarctica. Following survey by the British Antarctic Survey, 1975–77, it was named by the UK Antarctic Place-Names Committee (UK-APC) for Patrick John Michael Geelan, who was Secretary of the Permanent Committee on Geographical Names, 1955–79, a member of the UK-APC from 1955, and Chairman of the UK-APC from 1992.
