= Chance Rock =

Rock in the Palmer Archipelago, Antarctica

Coordinates: 64°0′S 61°13′W

Chance Rock is an isolated rock, which is awash, lying in the center of Gerlache Strait near its junction with Orléans Strait, in the Palmer Archipelago. It was shown on an Argentine government chart of 1957, and so named by the UK Antarctic Place-Names Committee in 1960 because the rock is a hazard to shipping.
