= Burns Bluff =

Antarctic cliff in Palmer's Land

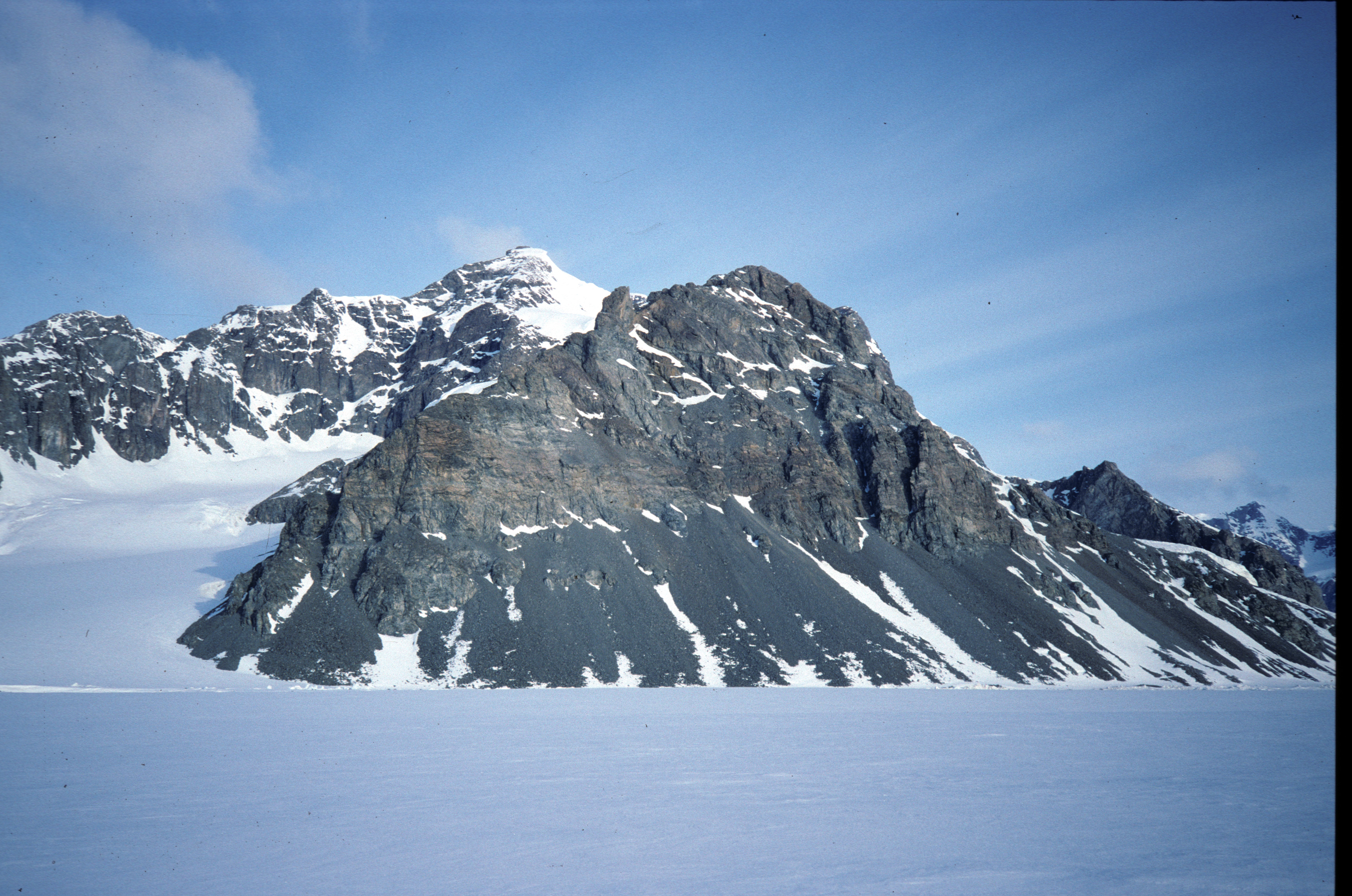
Central Burns Bluff seen from George VI Sound

Burns Bluff (70°22′S 67°56′W) is a bluff on the west coast of Palmer Land, immediately to the south of Naess Glacier. It was named by the UK Antarctic Place-Names Committee for Frederick M. Burns, British Antarctic Survey geophysicist at Stonington Island, 1967–69.
