= Sphinx Hill =

Black Hill on King George Island (Antarctica)

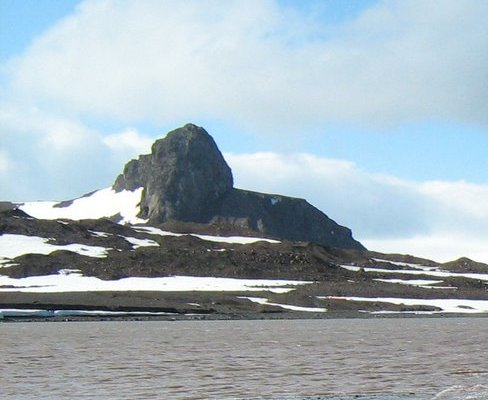
Sphinx Hill

Sphinx Hill (62°11′S 58°27′W) is a conspicuous, isolated black hill, 145 m, standing 1.5 nautical miles (2.8 km) north-northwest of Demay Point on King George Island, South Shetland Islands. First charted by the French Antarctic Expedition under Charcot, 1908–10. The descriptive name was given by the United Kingdom Antarctic Place-Names Committee (UK-APC) following a survey by Lieutenant Commander F.W. Hunt, Royal Navy, in 1951–52.
