= The Menhir =

Pinnacle rock on Coronation Island, South Orkney Islands

The Menhir (60°39′S 45°12′W) is an isolated pinnacle rock, 395 metres (1,300 ft) high, overlooking the west side of Gibbon Bay in eastern Coronation Island, in the South Orkney Islands off Antarctica. It was surveyed by the Falkland Islands Dependencies Survey in 1956–58 and named by the UK Antarctic Place-Names Committee in 1959; a menhir is an upright monumental stone.
