= Vogel Peak =

Mountain in South Georgia

Vogel Peak (54°34′S 36°14′W) is a peak, 1,350 m, rising 1.5 nautical miles (2.8 km) southeast of Ross Pass in the Salvesen Range of South Georgia. The name Matterhorn was given by the German group of the International Polar Year Investigations, 1882–83. This name has never gained currency, and since many peaks in South Georgia resemble the Swiss Matterhorn, a new name was proposed by the United Kingdom Antarctic Place-Names Committee (UK-APC) in 1957. Vogel Peak is named for Dr. P. Vogel, second-in-command, physicist and meteorologist on the 1882-83 German expedition who made the first glaciological studies in South Georgia.
