= Finback Massif =

Massif in Antarctica

Finback Massif (65°41′S 62°25′W) is a massif in Antarctica, rising to more than 1,000 metres (3,300 ft) between Stubb Glacier and Flask Glacier. It stands 6 nautical miles (11 km) west-northwest of Tashtego Point on the east side of Graham Land. The name is one of several applied by the UK Antarctic Place-Names Committee in this vicinity that reflects a whaling theme, the finback being a species of baleen whale.
