= Elliott Rock =

Coordinates: 54°0′S 38°5′W

Elliott Rock is a rock lying in Stewart Strait, close west of Bird Island, off the west end of South Georgia. It was positioned by Discovery Investigations personnel under Lieutenant Commander J.M. Chaplin in the period 1926–30, and was named in 1957 by the UK Antarctic Place-Names Committee for Henry W. Elliott (1846–1930), an American naturalist who was a pioneer of fur seal studies in the North Pacific and a lifelong champion of fur seal protection. Fur seals breed on nearby Bird Island.
