= Fulmar Crags =

The Fulmar Crags (60°38′S 45°11′W) are crags surmounting East Cape, the northeastern extremity of Coronation Island in the South Orkney Islands. The name arose from the Antarctic fulmars which breed on these crags and was given by the UK Antarctic Place-Names Committee following a 1956–58 survey by the Falkland Islands Dependencies Survey.
