= Catodon Rocks =

Catodon Rocks (63°30′S 60°0′W) are a small group of rocks just northeast of Ohlin Island, in the Palmer Archipelago. They were photographed by the Falkland Islands and Dependencies Aerial Survey Expedition in 1955–1957 and mapped from these photos. They were named by the UK Antarctic Place-Names Committee in 1960 after the sperm whale, Physeter catodon.
