= Black Head =

Black Head may refer to:

- Black head, a blocked sweat/sebaceous duct of the skin

== Headlands ==
=== Antarctica ===
- Black Head (Graham Land)
- Black Head (South Georgia)

=== Australia ===
- Black Head, New South Wales

=== Republic of Ireland ===
- Black Head, County Clare, near Gleninagh

=== United Kingdom ===
- Black Head (The Lizard), Cornwall, part of the Kennack to Coverack Site of Special Scientific Interest
- Black Head (St Austell), Cornwall
- Black Head, County Antrim, the site of Blackhead Lighthouse
- Black Head, Dorset
- Black Head, Wigtownshire, the site of many shipwrecks including a shipwreck in 1857

=== United States ===
- Black Head (South Georgia), a promontory

== See also ==
- Blackhead (disambiguation)
