= Jeffries Peak =

Mountain in Antarctica

Jeffries Peak (64°43′S 62°0′W) is a peak standing southward of Wilhelmina Bay, between Leonardo Glacier and Blanchard Glacier on the west coast of Graham Land, Antarctica. It was mapped by the Falkland Islands Dependencies Survey from photos taken by Hunting Aerosurveys Ltd in 1956–57, and was named by the UK Antarctic Place-Names Committee for John Jeffries, an American physician who, with Jean Blanchard, made the first balloon crossing of the English Channel in 1785.
