= Hag Pike =

Rock column in Antarctica

Hag Pike (68°57′S 66°59′W) is a conspicuous rock column, 710 metres (2,330 ft) high, on the north side of the Wordie Ice Shelf near the west coast of the Antarctic Peninsula. Together with the mountain to the north, it forms the west side of the mouth of Hariot Glacier. Hag Pike was photographed from the air by the British Graham Land Expedition, 1937, and by the Ronne Antarctic Research Expedition, 1947. It was surveyed by the Falkland Islands Dependencies Survey, 1948–50, and 1958. The name by the UK Antarctic Place-Names Committee is descriptive, "hag" being the stump of a tree which remains after felling.
