= Glass Point =

Glass Point (61°56′S 58°12′W) is a point 4.5 nautical miles (8 km) southwest of False Round Point on the north coast of King George Island, South Shetland Islands. It was named by the UK Antarctic Place-Names Committee in 1960 for R.H. Glass, Master of the Francis Allyn from New London, Connecticut, who visited the South Shetland Islands in 1873–75 and 1877–79. In 1877–78 he rescued from Potter Cove the sole survivor of the sealing crew from the Florence.
