= Morton Cliff =

- Rock cliff
- Coordinates: 62°28′S 60°8′W
- Location: Livingston Island, South Shetland Islands, Antarctica
- Elevation: 35 m (115 ft)

Morton Cliff (62°28′S 60°8′W) is a prominent sub-vertical rock cliff rising to about 35 metres (115 ft) above sea level, forming the western escarpment of Williams Point, Livingston Island in the South Shetland Islands off Antarctica. It was named by the UK Antarctic Place-Names Committee in 1998 after British Antarctic Survey field assistant Ashley Morton (born 1953).
