= Chisel Peak =

Mountain in Antarctica

Coordinates: 67°40′S 67°42′W

Chisel Peak is a prominent chisel-shaped peak rising to about 1,400 metres (4,600 ft) on the southeast side of Perplex Ridge, Pourquoi Pas Island, in Marguerite Bay. It was named descriptively by the UK Antarctic Place-Names Committee in 1979.
