= Catcher Icefall =

Icefall in South Georgia

Catcher Icefall (54°9′S 37°40′W) is an icefall between Elephant Cove and Bomford Peak on the south side of South Georgia. The UK Antarctic Place-Names Committee name was chosen for its association with the whaling industry.
