= Hornpipe Heights =

Group of land forms in Antarctica

The Hornpipe Heights (69°51′S 70°36′W) are a group of partly exposed ridges rising to about 1,200 metres (4,000 ft) lying between Sullivan Glacier, Mikado Glacier, and Clarsach Glacier in the northern part of Alexander Island, Antarctica. Whistle Pass is adjacent to the northeastern part of the heights. The heights were so named by the UK Antarctic Place-Names Committee in 1977 in association with Whistle Pass.

== See also ==
- Care Heights
- Herschel Heights
- Sutton Heights
