= Blackhead (disambiguation) =

A blackhead is a blocked sweat/sebaceous duct of the skin known medically as an open comedo.

Blackhead may also refer to:

== Places ==
- Blackhead (New Zealand), a cliff promontory to the south of Dunedin, New Zealand
  - Blackhead Beach (Otago), close to the promontory
- Blackhead, Hawke's Bay, a settlement in Hawke's Bay, New Zealand
- Blackhead Bay, a bay in Newfoundland and Labrador, Canada
- A community in Small Point-Adam's Cove-Blackhead-Broad Cove, Newfoundland and Labrador, Canada
- Blackhead Mountains, a mountain range in the northern Catskills of New York, US
  - Blackhead (New York), a peak in the Blackhead Range of mountains, New York, US
- Blackhead Point, also known as Tai Pau Mai, a cape in Hong Kong

== Other uses ==
- Blackhead disease, or histomoniasis, which affects poultry

== See also ==
- Brotherhood of Black Heads, a guild of unmarried merchants in historical Livonia
- Black Head (disambiguation)
- Black-headed caique (Pionites melanocephalus), a small parrot of South America
