= Lorn Rocks =

Antarctic Rocks

The Lorn Rocks (65°31′S 64°56′W) are a group of rocks lying 12 nautical miles (22 km) west of the north end of Lahille Island, in the Biscoe Islands of Antarctica. They were mapped by the Falkland Islands Dependencies Survey from photos taken by Hunting Aerosurveys Ltd in 1956–57, and were so named by the UK Antarctic Place-Names Committee because the rocks are small, forlorn and deserted.
