= Boreas Peak =

Boreas Peak (69°38′S 68°20′W) is a nunatak, 670 metres (2,200 ft) high, at the north side of the terminus of Eureka Glacier, on the Rymill Coast of Palmer Land. The best ramp for the approach to Eureka Glacier from George VI Sound is normally found close to this nunatak. It was named by the UK Antarctic Place-Names Committee after Boreas, the north wind in Greek, in association with other wind names in the area.
