= Kinzl Crests =

Peaks in Antarctica

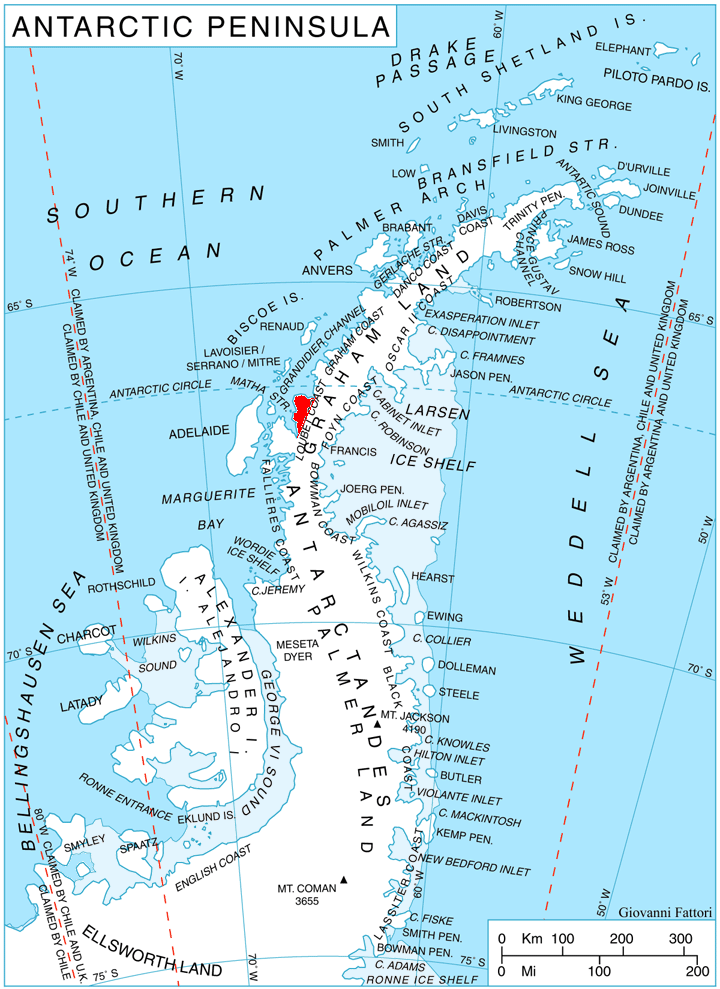
Location of Pernik Peninsula on Loubet Coast, Antarctic Peninsula.

The Kinzl Crests (67°5′S 66°18′W) are a group of three peaks, 2,135 metres (7,000 ft) high, on Pernik Peninsula, Loubet Coast in Graham Land, Antarctica, standing 3 nautical miles (6 km) east of Salmon Cove and Lallemand Fjord. They were mapped from air photos taken by the Falkland Islands and Dependencies Aerial Survey Expedition, 1956–57, and were named by the UK Antarctic Place-Names Committee for Hans Kinzl, an Austrian glaciologist.
