= Tow Bay =

Tow Bay (57°2′S 26°42′W) is a small bay 0.2 nautical miles (0.4 km) south of Vulcan Point on the west side of Candlemas Island, in the South Sandwich Islands. Charted and named in 1930 by DI personnel on the Discovery II.
