= Vogel Ski Resort =

Slovenian ski resort

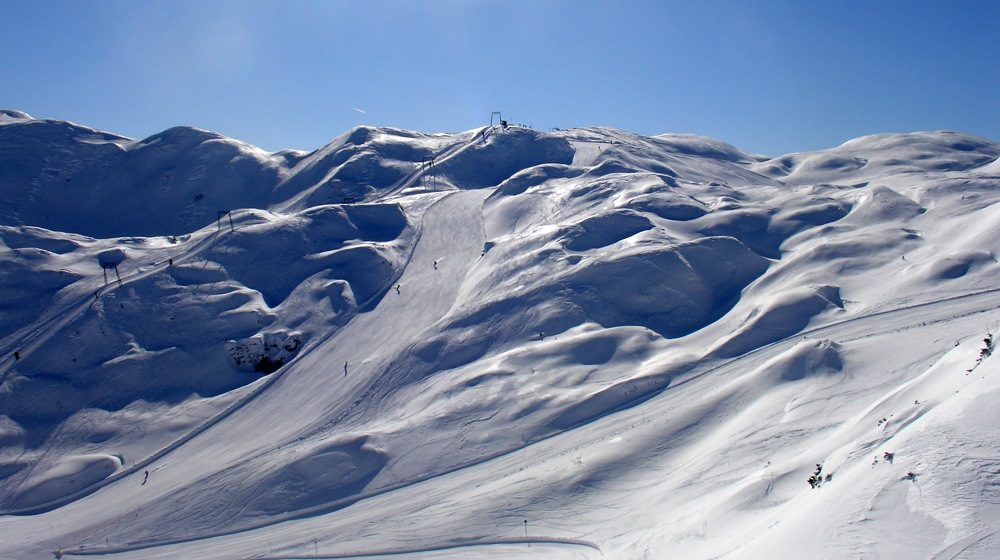
- Landscape view
- Interactive map of Vogel Ski Resort
- Location: Ukanc, Bohinj; Slovenia
- Nearest city: Bled
- Coordinates: 46.2756°N 13.8353°E
- Vertical: 1,240 m (4,070 ft)
- Top elevation: 1,800 m (5,900 ft)
- Base elevation: 560 m (1,840 ft)
- Skiable area: 0.78 square kilometres (190 acres)
- Trails: Total 22 km 9.5 km 12.5 km
- Longest run: 68 km (42 mi)
- Lift system: 8 total 1 funifor 3 surface 1 singlechair 1 10 pers. gondola 2 fourchair
- Lift capacity: 8.911 / hr
- Snowfall: 800 cm (310 in)
- Snowmaking: no
- Website: vogel.si

Vogel Ski Resort is a Slovenian ski resort located above Bohinj next to Lake Bohinj. The nearest city is Bled. Ljubljana is about an hour away. The resort was opened in 1964. It has a total of 22 kilometres (14 mi) of ski slopes, 8 kilometres (5.0 mi) tracks for cross country skiing and a snowboard park. The ski resort is located on the outskirts of Triglav National Park, therefore all snowmaking activities are forbidden on the area. The ski resort is named after nearby Mount Vogel.

== History ==
The first cargo funifor started operating in 1961, but it was broken down because of a lightning strike. In 1964 the first passenger funifor was built with capacity of 15 passengers. In the fall of 1964, the first surface lift, 'Križ' started operating. In the following 3 years, new chairlifts were built and in the 1970s a new Ski Hotel and other gastronomy services were built. The latest modernisation of the ski resort happened in the 2000s, when the old funifor was replaced by the new 'Poma' (2001) and two four-seater chairlifts were delivered by Doppelmayr in 2007.

== Accommodation ==
Accommodation capabilities are available directly on the Ski Resort in a Ski Hotel or in the town of Bohinj.

Major hotels in the vicinity:

- Ski Hotel (Right on the Ski Resort)temporarily closed
- Bohinj Park Eco Hotel
- Hotel Bohinj
- Hotel Jezero
- Hotel Kristal
- Hotel Center Bohinjsko Jezero

== Ski lifts ==
Lift name	Type of the lift	Manufacturer	Year of construction
Nihalka	Aerial tramway	Poma	2003
Orlove glave	Fourchair	Doppelmayr	2007
Brunarica	Fourchair	Doppelmayr	2007
Storeč	Surface lift	Doppelmayr	1977
Konta	Surface lift	Doppelmayr	1967
Kratki plaz	Surface lift	Leitner	1965
Šija	Singlechair	Girak	1965
Zadnji Vogel	Gondola lift	Doppelmayr	2023

== Ski slopes ==
Name	Length	Max Incline	Category
Brunarica	320 m	25%	
Storeč	400 m	28%	
Storeč bypass	640 m	12%	
Orlove glave	1300 m	25%	
Konta	250 m	40%	
Konta bypass	480 m	30%	
Kratki plaz	520 m	35%	
Kratki plaz bypass	940 m	30%	
Šija-Konta	1250 m	30%	
Šija-Zadnji Vogel	1300 m	45%	
Orlove glave - Zadnji Vogel	2100 m	40%	
Brunarica - Zadnji Vogel	2200 m	35%	
Žagarjev graben	6800 m	45%	

== Snow Park ==
Vogel Snow Park occupies approximately 2 hectares (4.9 acres). Many competitions and other activities have occurred for many years at Vogel Snow Park, owing to its relative size and popularity.

=== Structures in the snow park ===
- Box, 3 m and 6 m
- C-box
- Picnic table
- Barrel
- Info point Container
- Roller, 8–10 m
- Mini kicker, 3–4 m
- Rainbow, 6 m
- Mini rainbow
- Downrail, 4,5 m and 5,3 m and 9 m
- Double wave, 9 m
- Big air, 14–16 m
- Big air, 10–12 m
- Double king, 10 m
- King box, 7 m

== Snow school and equipment rental ==
Finžgar and Alpinsport provide convenient ski coaching and equipment rental services at Vogel Ski Resort. The ski schools provide private coaches for all levels of skiers and snowboarders.

== Gallery ==
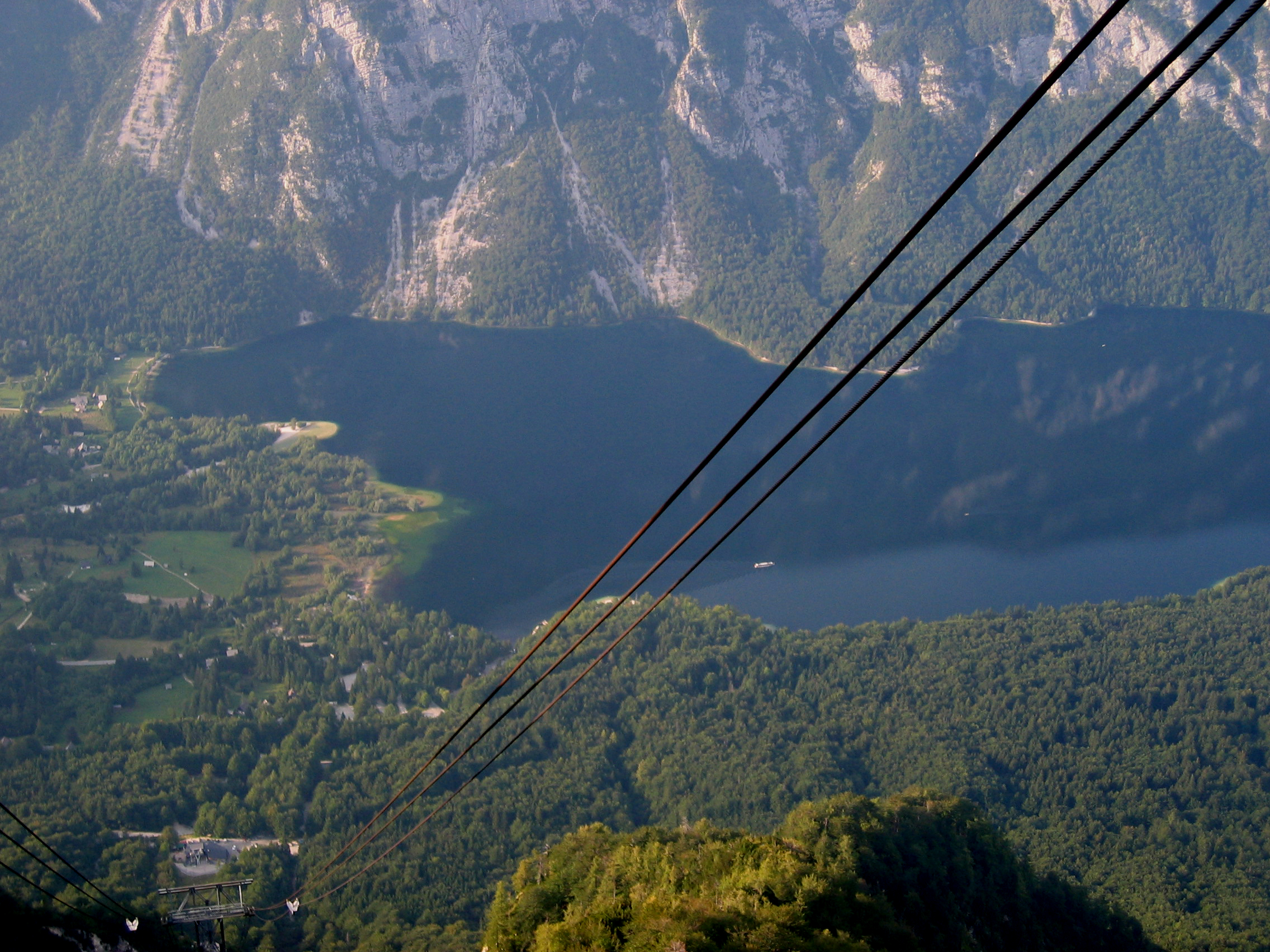
Funifor and the Bohinj lake in the background.

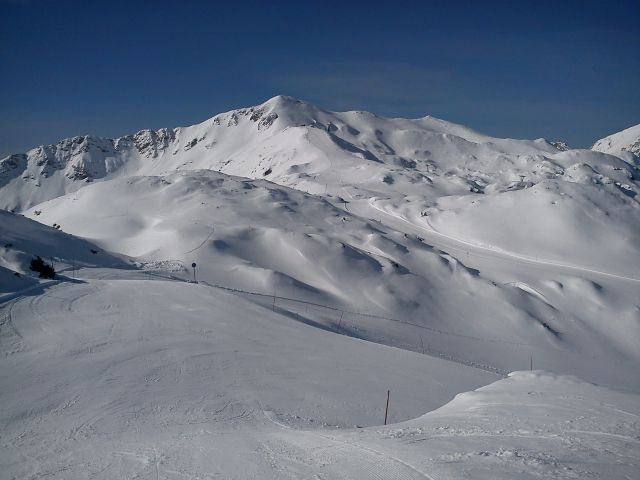
White slopes on the Vogel ski resort.

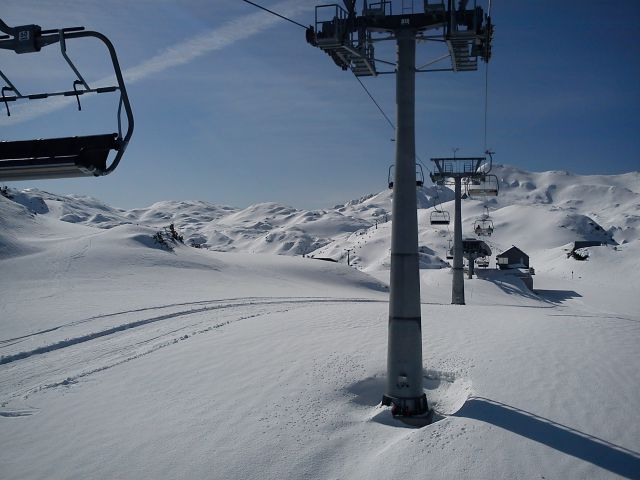
Orlove glave fourchair.

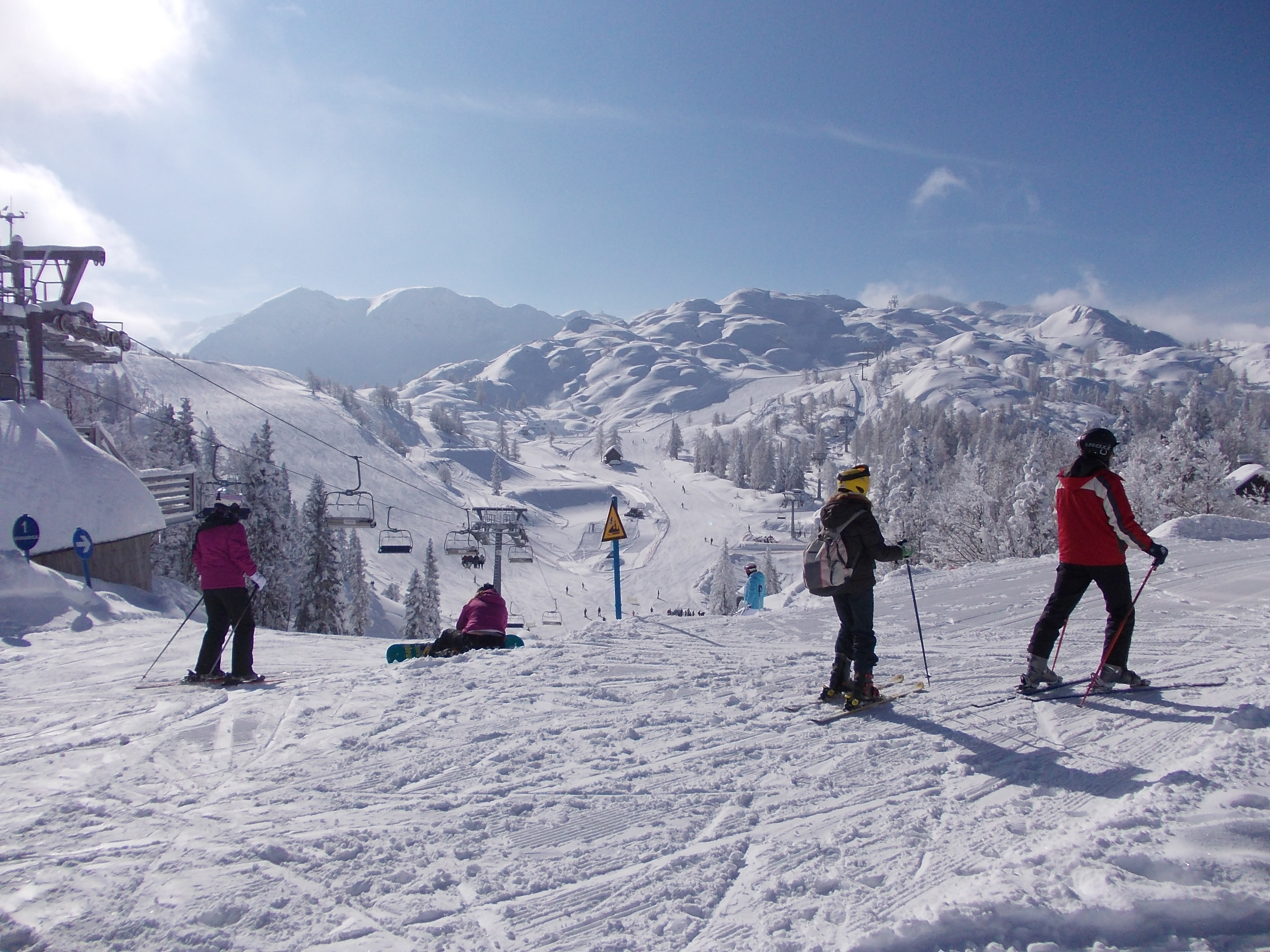
Winter fairytale.

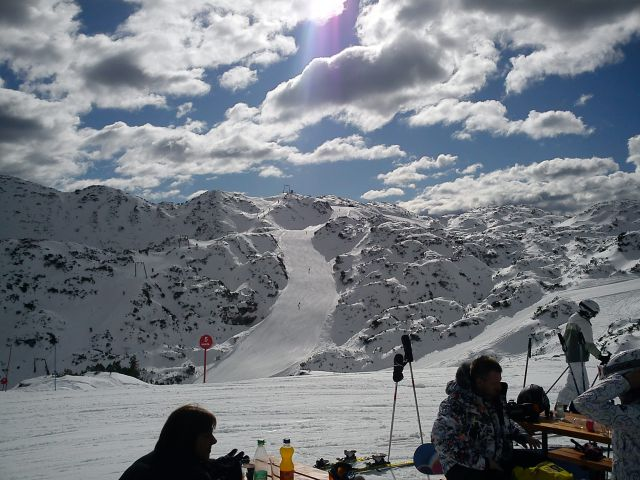
View on the ski slope.

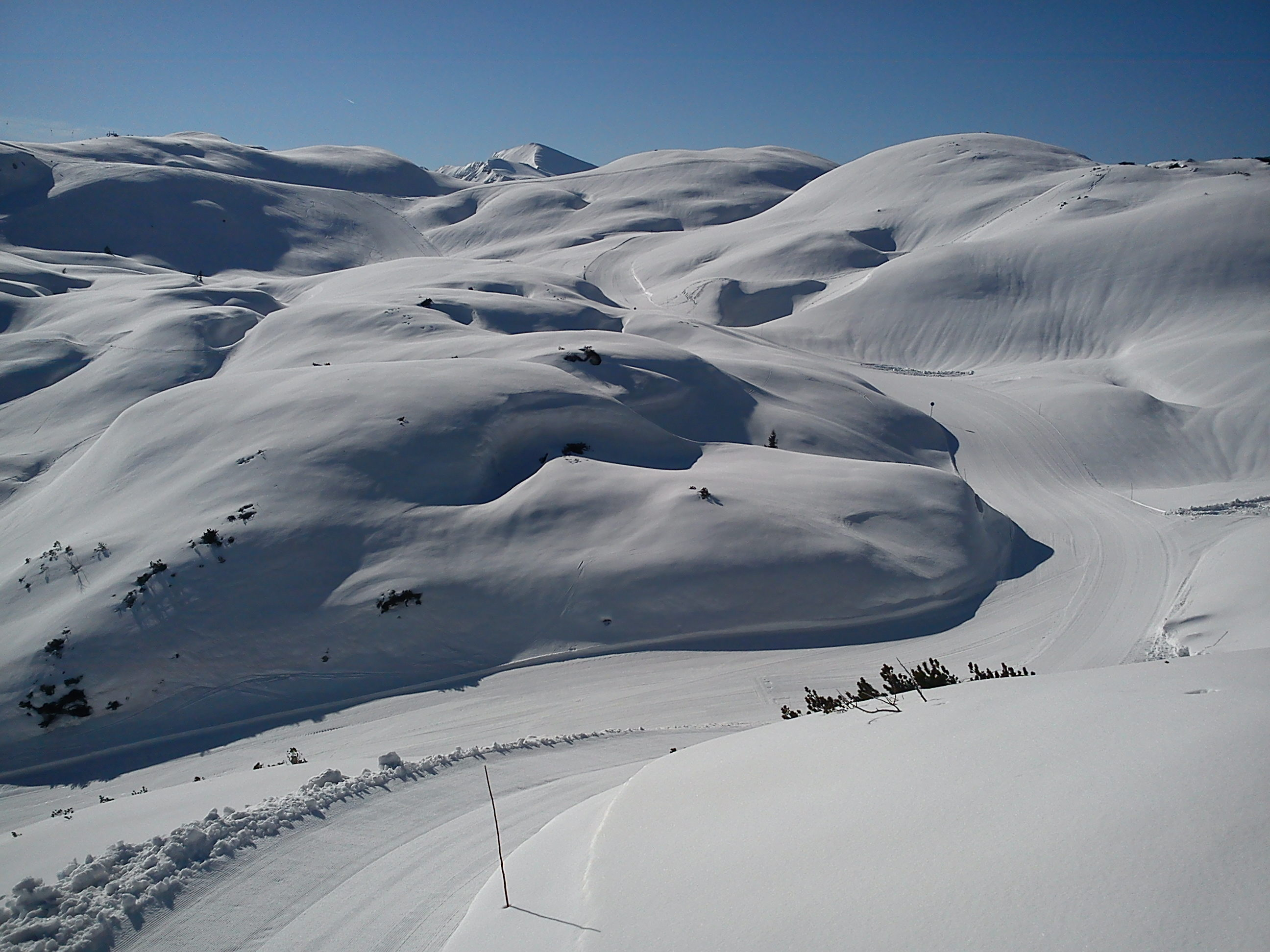
Ski slopes.

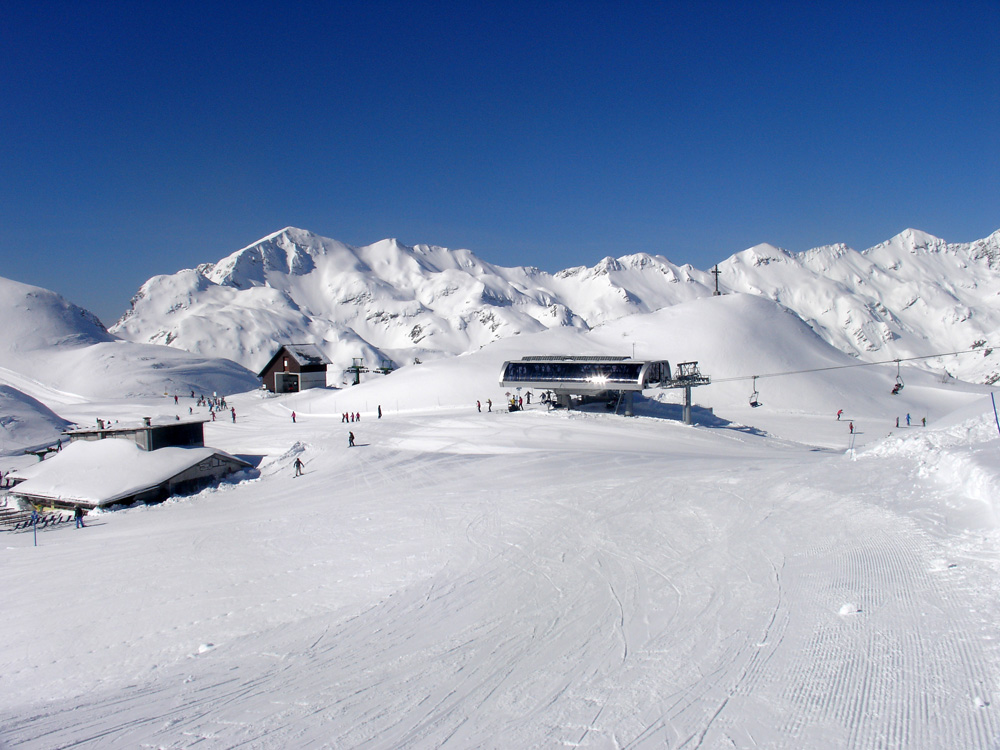
Vogel Ski resort and Mount Vogel in the background.

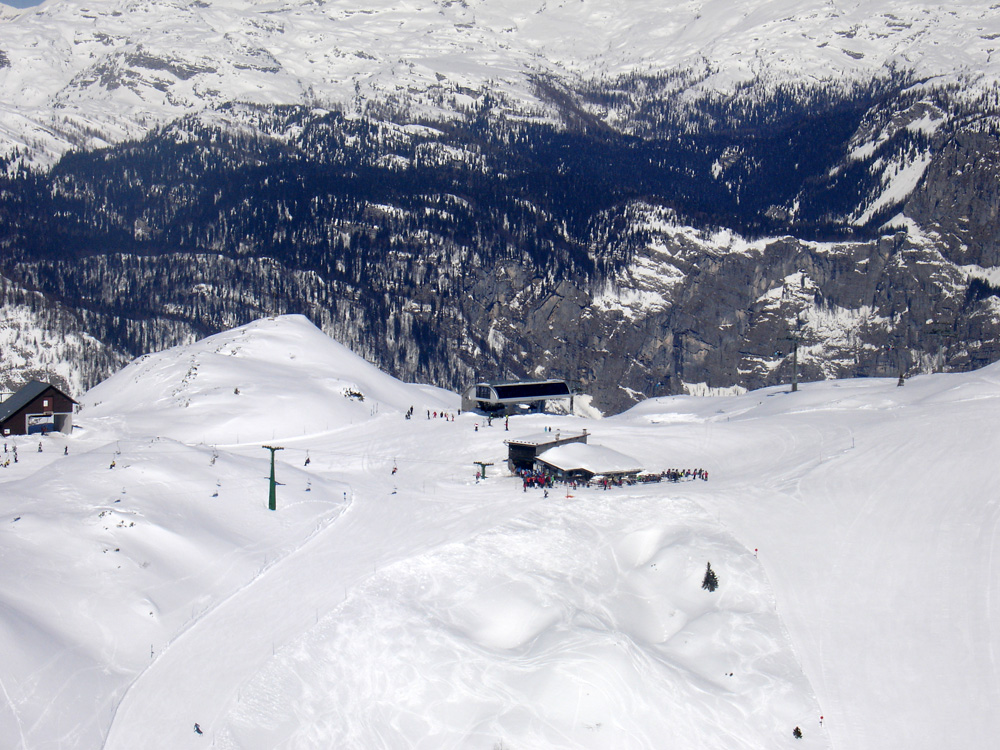
View from the top.

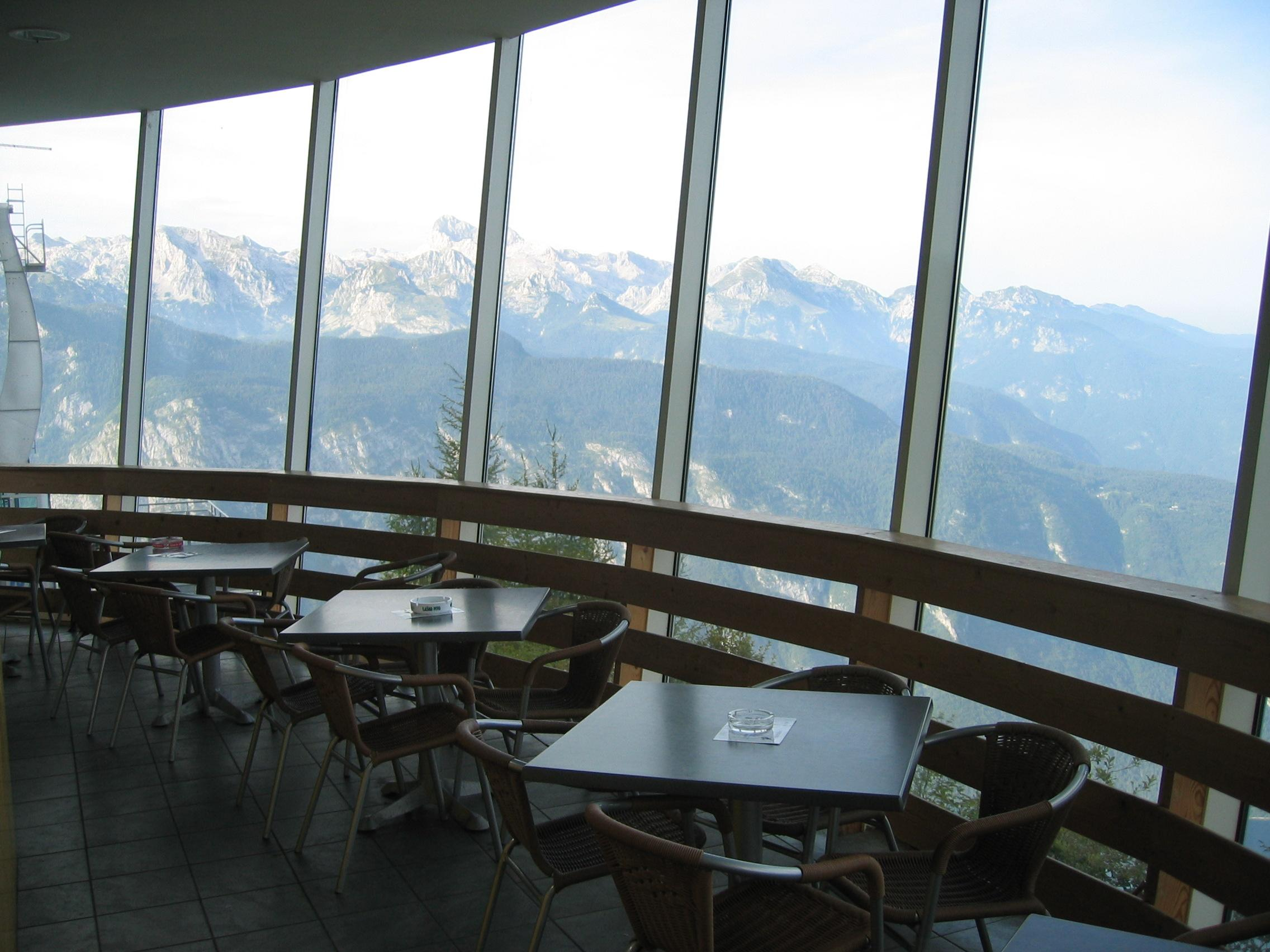
View on the Julian Alps from the upper funifor station.
