= Vogel (mountain) =

Mountain in Slovenia

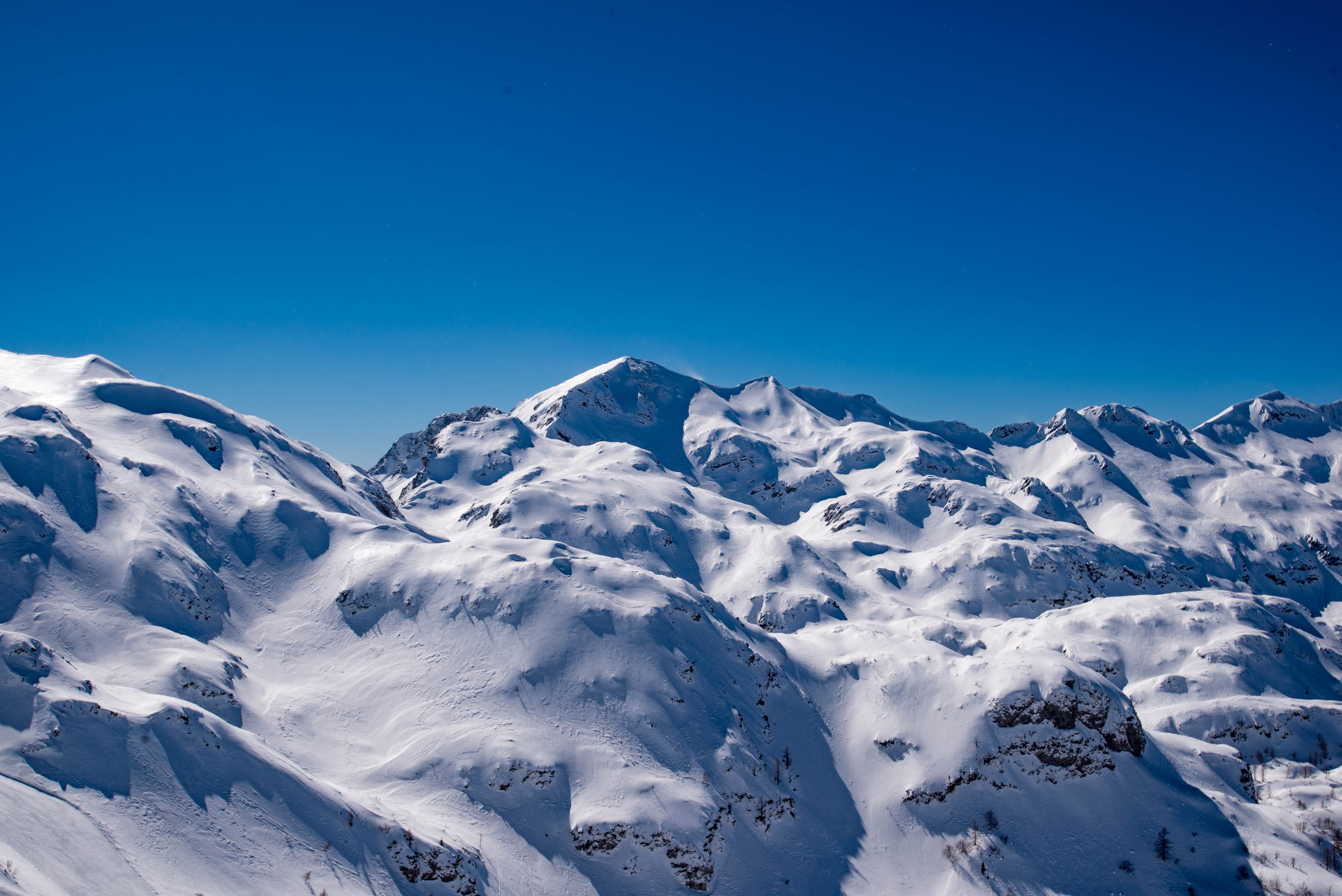

Highest point
- Elevation: 1,922 m (6,306 ft)
- Coordinates: 46°14′18.26″N 13°48′45.02″E

Geography
- Location within Slovenia
- Location: Slovenia
- Parent range: Julian Alps

Vogel is a 1922-meter-high mountain in Slovenia, part of southern Julian Alps within Triglav National Park. A cable car runs from Lake Bohinj up to a height of 1537 meters.

The Vogel Ski Resort is one of the biggest of its kind in Slovenia.

== Routes ==
- 2½h from Ski hotel Vogel
- 2¾h from Planina Kuk
- 3½h Planina Kuk via Globoko
- 3¾h from Planina Storeča raven
- 4½h from Ukanc via planina Zadnji Vogel

== Gallery ==
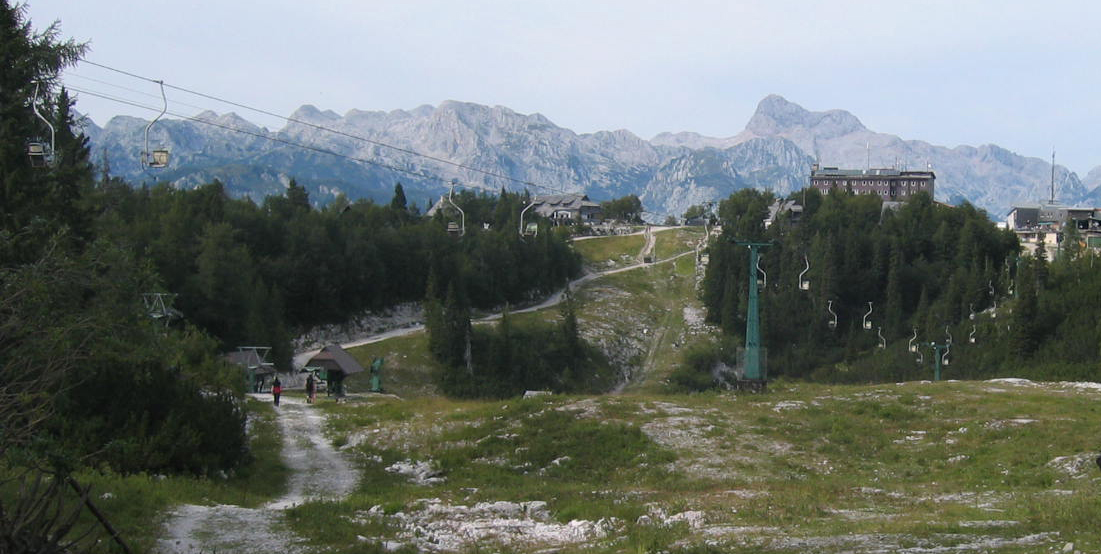
Ski resort Vogel with Triglav in the background

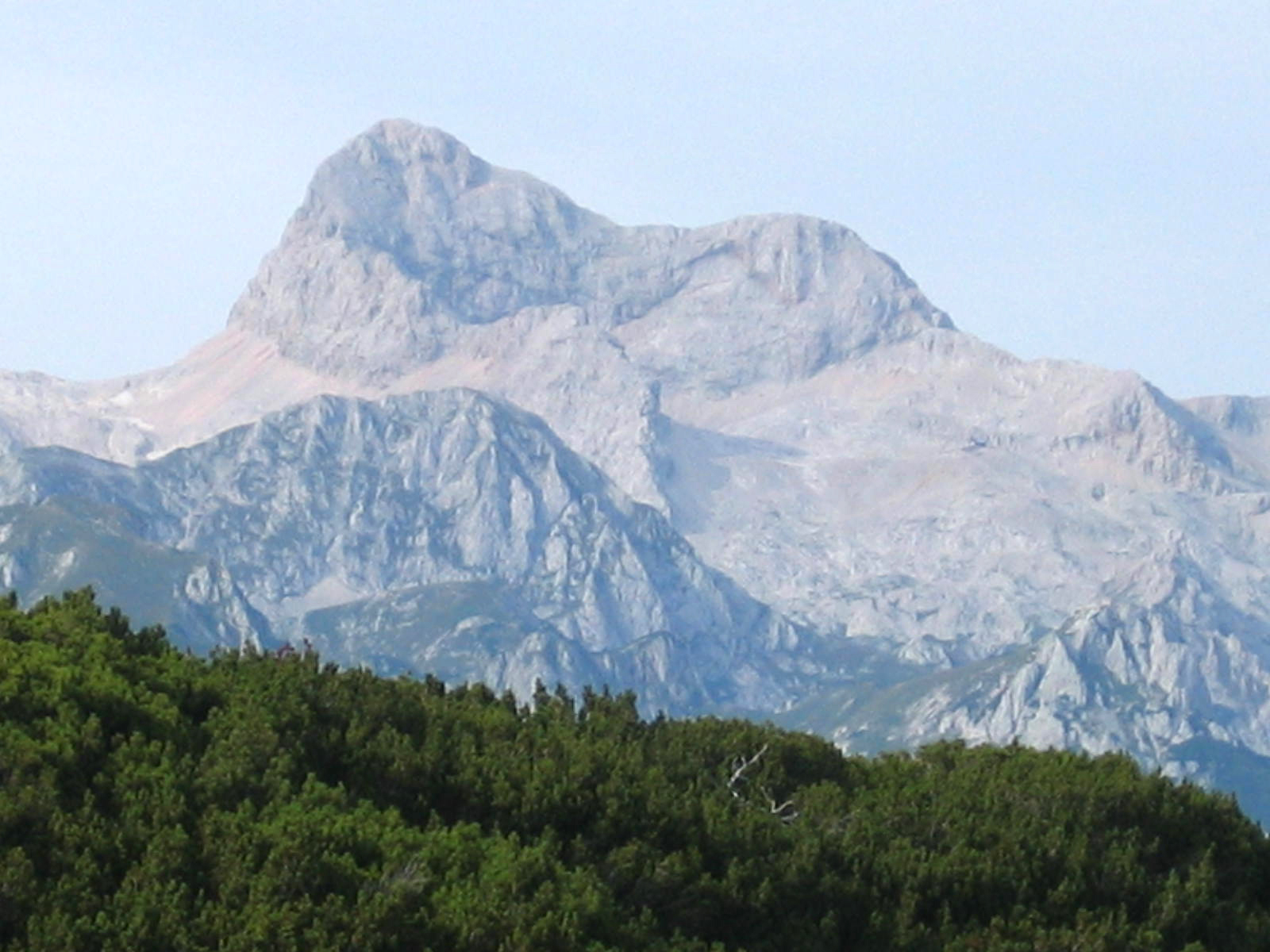
View of Triglav

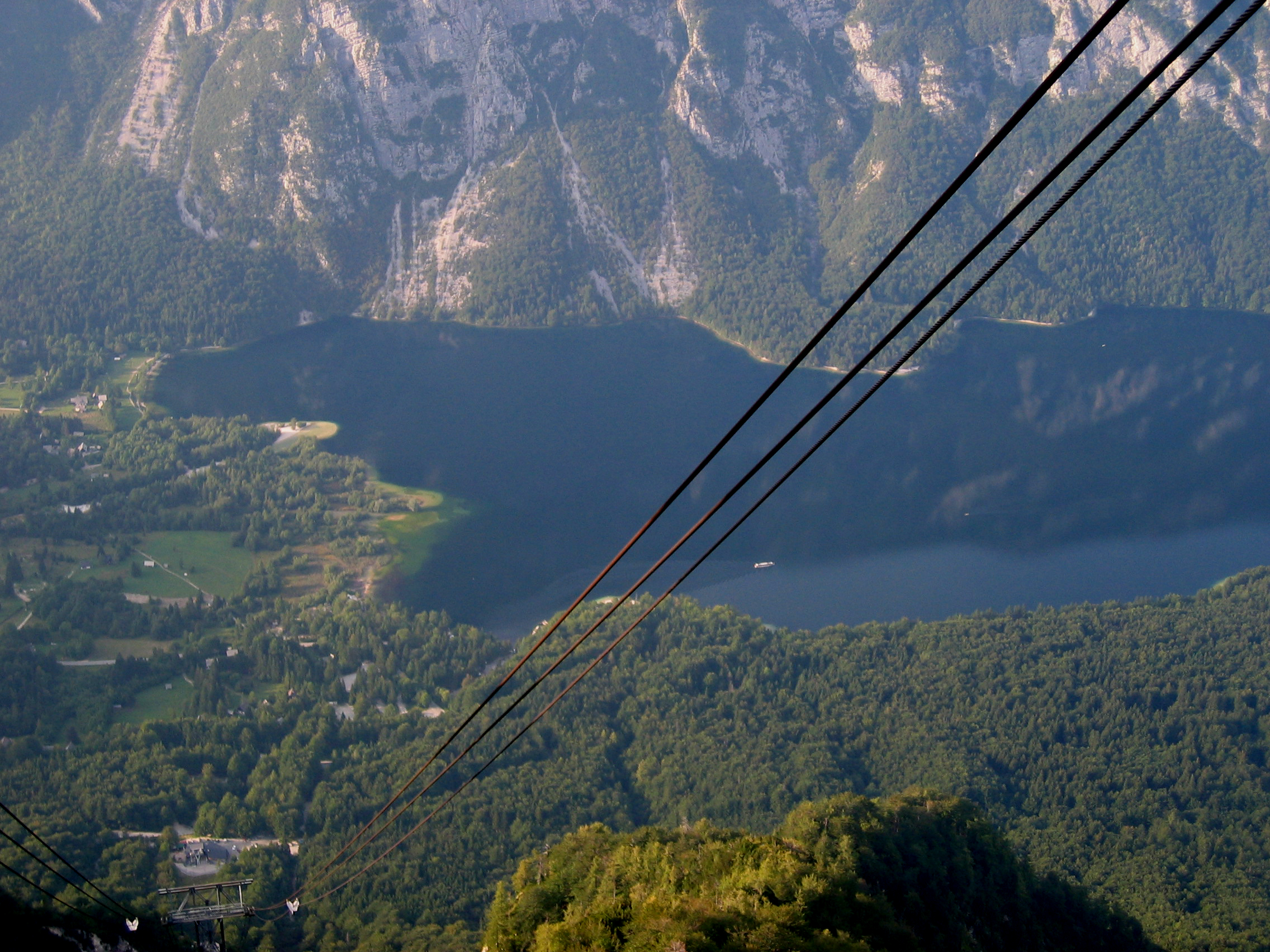
View of Lake Bohinj

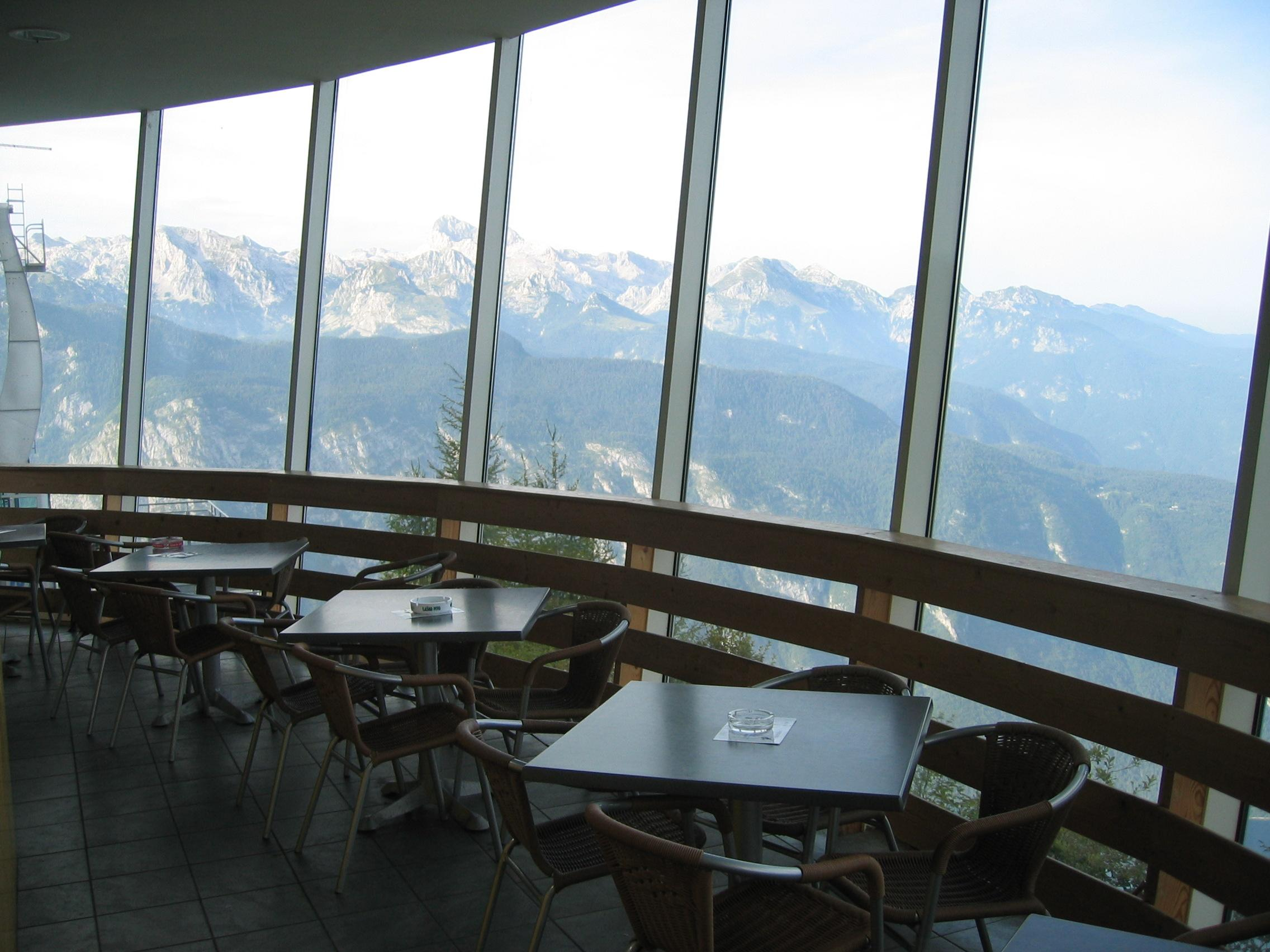
Panoramic restaurant
