= Darboux Island =

Island in Graham Land, Antarctica

Darboux Island (65°25′S 64°15′W) is an island 1 nautical mile (2 km) long rising to 270 metres (900 ft), lying 3 nautical miles (6 km) west of Cape Perez off the west coast of Graham Land. It was discovered by the French Antarctic Expedition, 1903–05, and named by Jean-Baptiste Charcot for Jean Gaston Darboux, the noted French mathematician.

== See also ==
- List of Antarctic and sub-Antarctic islands
