= Saffery Islands =

Island group off Graham Land, Antarctica

Saffery Islands (66°4′S 65°49′W) is a group of islands extending west from Black Head, off the west coast of Graham Land, Antarctica. Charted by the British Graham Land Expedition (BGLE) under Rymill, 1934–37. Named by the United Kingdom Antarctic Place-Names Committee (UK-APC) for J.H. Saffery, Deputy Leader and Flying Manager of the Falkland Islands and Dependencies Aerial Survey Expedition (FIDASE) which photographed part of the area in 1955–57.

== See also ==
- List of Antarctic and sub-Antarctic islands
- Whit Rock
