= Lystad Bay =

Bay in Antarctica

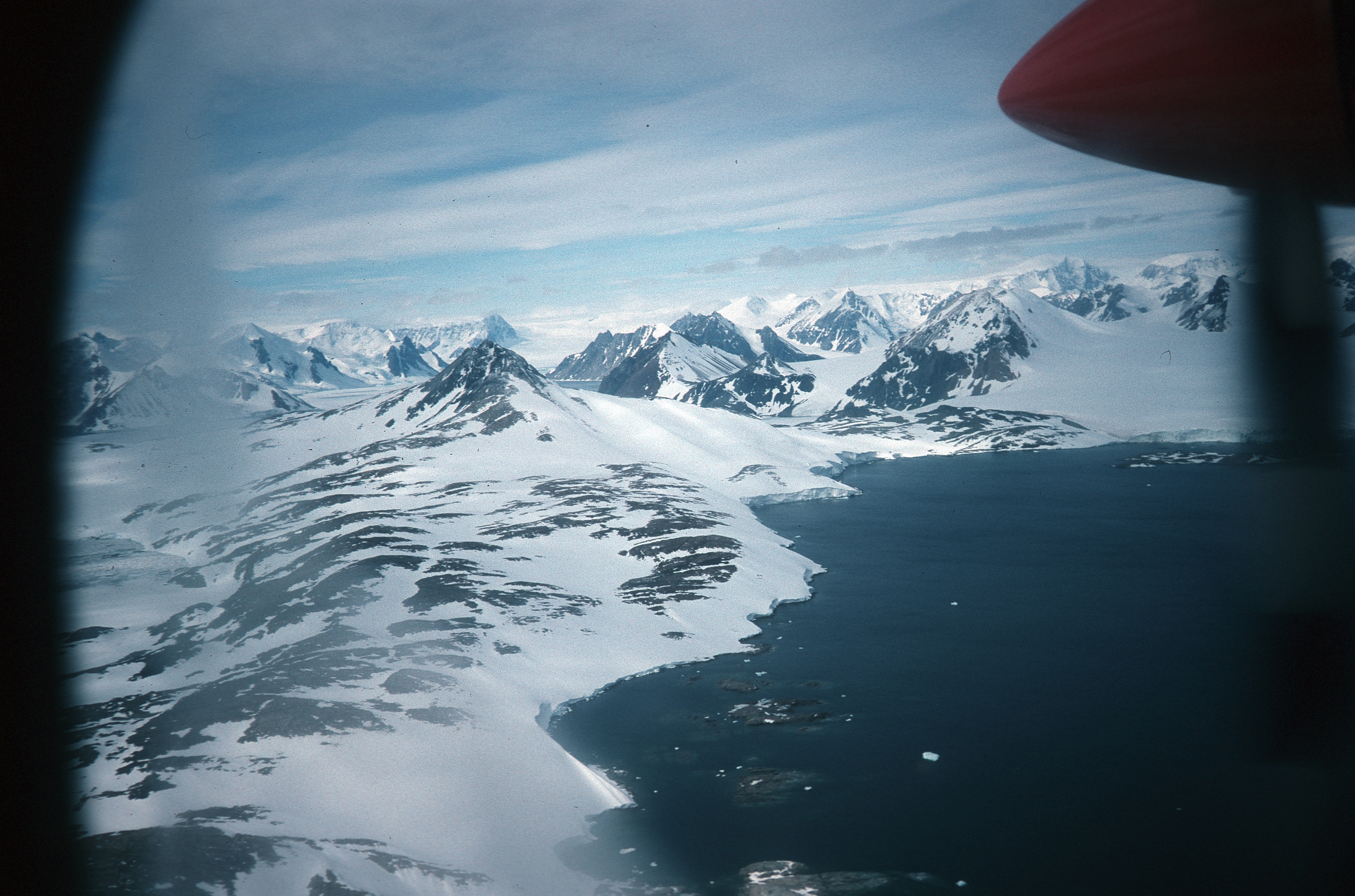
Lystad Bay

Lystad Bay (67°50′S 67°17′W) is a bay 2.5 nautical miles (5 km) wide which indents the west side of Horseshoe Island, in the northeast part of Marguerite Bay, Antarctica. It was first surveyed in 1936–37 by the British Graham Land Expedition under John Rymill, and was visited by the USMS North Star and USS Bear of the United States Antarctic Service in 1940. The name was proposed by the Advisory Committee on Antarctic Names for Captain Isak Lystad of the North Star.
