= John Hugh Saffery =

- Born: 1907
- Died: 1985 (aged 77–78)
- Military career
- Allegiance: United Kingdom
- Branch: Royal Navy; Royal Air Force
- Service years: 1939–1946
- Rank: Squadron Leader
- Unit: No. 1 Gliding School RAF
- Commands: No. 541 (Photo Reconnaissance) Squadron
- Conflicts: World War II
- Awards: Distinguished Service Order; 2 × King's Commendation for Valuable Service in the Air; Mention in despatches Croix de guerre avec palme (Belgium)
- Other work: Survey pilot

Squadron Leader John Hugh Saffery DSO (1907–1985) was an officer of the British Royal Air Force during World War II, who served as flying instructor for glider pilots and then commanded a photo reconnaissance squadron. Post-war, he became a survey pilot for Hunting Aerosurveys Ltd.

== Early life ==
At the age of seven Saffery was taken by his father to Hendon Aerodrome, and from then on his only ambition was to become a pilot. After being educated at St Ronan's School, Hawkhurst, Kent, he attempted to join the Royal Air Force, but was turned down due to a defect in one eye. Undaunted, he then worked at an advertising agency, and in 1926 began taking flying lessons at the London Aeroplane Club. In March 1927 he passed his test for the Royal Aero Club's Aviators' Certificate, and was granted Certificate No. 8096 in May. Saffery then became interested in gliding, and was awarded RAeC Gliding Certificate No. 104 at the London Gliding Club in February 1931. In 1938 Saffery began working for F. Slingsby, builders of gliders and sailplanes.

== World War II ==
Soon after the outbreak of World War II Saffery joined the Royal Naval Volunteer Reserve to serve in the Fleet Air Arm, being commissioned as a temporary sub-lieutenant on 1 November 1939, with seniority from 25 September. However, in May 1940 the British learned of the use of glider-borne troops by the Germans during the invasion of Belgium, at the assault on Fort Eben-Emael, and so on 17 June Winston Churchill ordered the formation of airborne forces. The first step was the formation of the Central Landing Establishment at Ringway Airport, Manchester, in June 1940 where the first attempts at military parachuting and gliding began. Saffery was soon attached to the new unit on the basis of his pre-war gliding experience, being transferred to the Royal Air Force, and appointed Chief Flying Instructor at No. 1 Gliding School based at RAF Thame.

On 11 June 1942 Saffery was awarded the King's Commendation for Valuable Service in the Air.

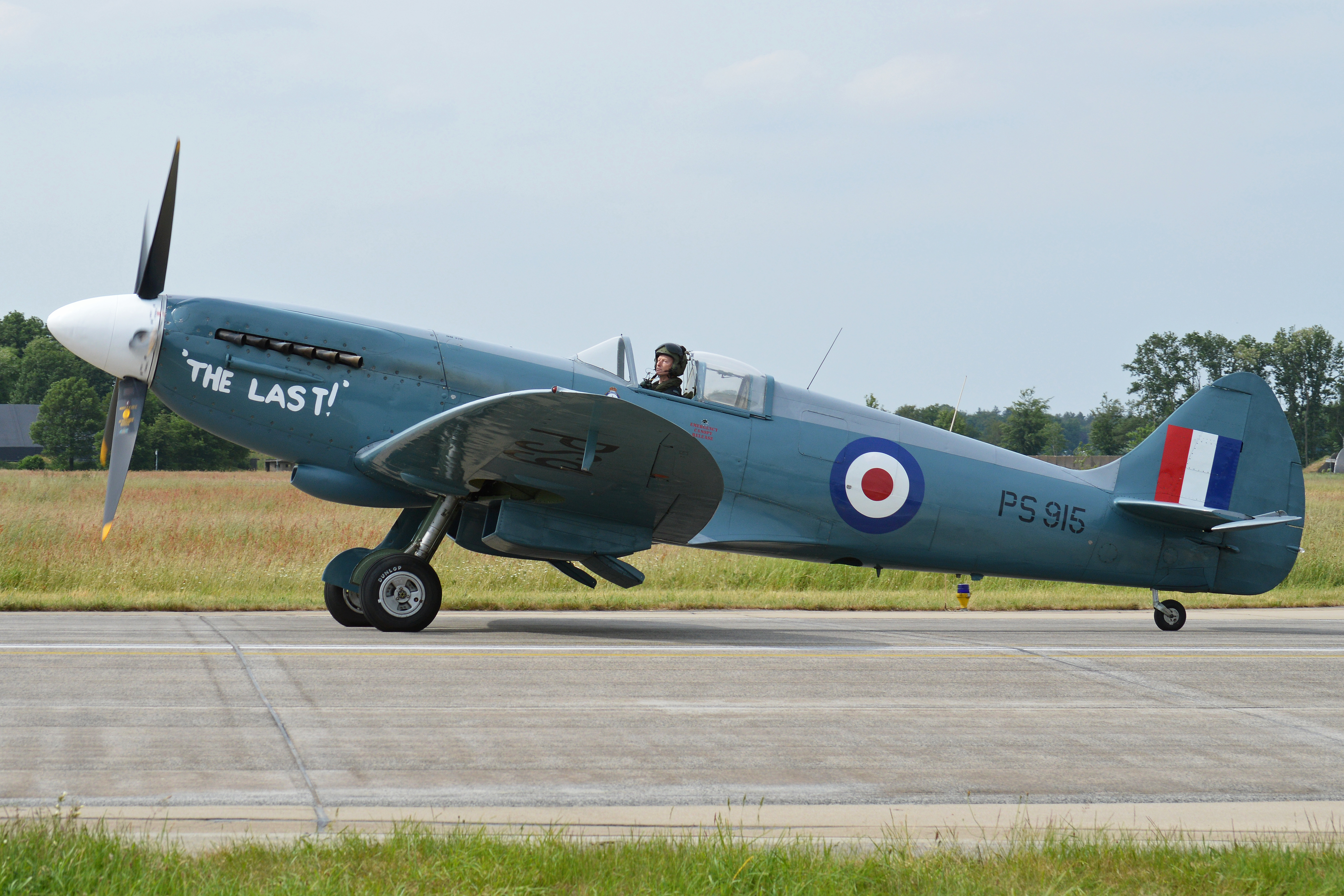
Spitfire PR.XIX PS915 in 2013, formerly of No. 541 (PR) Squadron, then part of the Battle of Britain Memorial Flight. The aircraft is painted PRU blue.

He was promoted from flight lieutenant to squadron leader on 1 July 1943. He took command of a photo reconnaissance training unit, and subsequently of No. 541 (Photo Reconnaissance) Squadron, flying specially adapted Spitfires. Most sorties were flown at altitudes of around 40,000 feet (12,000 m), beyond the reach of the Luftwaffe, but the cockpits were unpressurized, resulting in considerable discomfort to the pilots, who were in the air for several hours. Saffery flew 37 sorties over Germany and France, photographing potential targets for RAF Bomber Command including V-1 flying bomb and V-2 rocket launching sites.

On 1 June 1944 he was awarded the Distinguished Service Order. His citation read:

Squadron Leader John Hugh Saffery (61457), Royal Air Force Volunteer Reserve, No. 541 Squadron.

"An outstanding officer, Squadron Leader Saffery, by his untiring energy, enthusiasm and devotion to duty has set a splendid example to his subordinates. He has taken part in a number of operational sorties to difficult and distant enemy targets. On one recent sortie he remained for over an hour over one of the most heavily defended areas of Germany, despite the most intense enemy opposition. This officer's sorties have been model to all for thoroughness of preparation and skill and resoluteness of execution."

Shortly after D-Day he had to bail out over the English Channel, spending a whole day floating on his life-raft, before being rescued by a passing torpedo boat.

In 1946 Saffery received a number of awards: firstly on 1 January, a mention in despatches, then on 13 June his second King's Commendation for Valuable Service in the Air, and finally on 26 July he was granted permission to the wear the Croix de Guerre (with palm), conferred by the government of Belgium "in recognition of valuable services rendered in connection with the war".

Saffery was finally demobilized in 1946, though he remained on the Emergency List of the Royal Air Force Volunteer Reserve, until eventually relinquishing his commission on 10 February 1954, being permitted to retain the rank of squadron leader.

== Post-war career ==
Saffery joined Hunting Aerosurveys Ltd. as Chief Pilot and later Flying Manager. On 13 January 1950 at Luton Airport Hunting Aerosurveys took delivery of the first Survey Prince aircraft, which was soon on its way to carry out a photographic survey of Southern Persia on behalf of the Anglo-Iranian Oil Company, with Saffery as chief pilot and expedition manager. In November the same year Hunting Aerosurveys won a contract from the Government of Siam for aerial photography and mapping of some 5,800 square miles (15,000 km^{2}) of Central Siam, as well as a large-scale survey for a new railway, with Saffery as chief pilot and expedition manager. From May 1951 Saffery was in charge of an expedition to Kuwait, commissioned by Sheikh Abdullah Al-Salim Al-Sabah, to prepare large-scale photo-mosaics of Kuwait City and the surrounding 95 square miles (250 km^{2}). The following year he was in charge of a survey in the Sudan, providing photographs and mosaics covering an area of 4,000 square miles (10,000 km^{2}), which were then handed over to ecologists employed by Sir Alexander Gibb & Partners, to report to the Sudanese Government on the possibilities of irrigation projects adjacent to the White and Blue Nile. The survey was extended to cover the proposed reservoir at Er Roseires on the Blue Nile.

From 1955 to 1957 Saffery served as the Flying Manager and Deputy Leader of the Falkland Islands and Dependencies Aerial Survey Expedition (FIDASE), carried out by Hunting Aerosurveys on a contract from the Directorate of Colonial Surveys on behalf of the Falkland Islands Government. This involved carrying out an aerial survey of some 45,000 square miles (120,000 km^{2}) of British Antarctica, comprising the South Shetland Islands and the Graham Land peninsula as far as the 68th parallel south, as well as the Falkland Islands themselves, comprising another 5,000 square miles (13,000 km^{2}). Using the 900-ton depot ship Oluf Sven, the expedition created a base of operations on Deception Island, which had the advantage of being ice-free during the summer months (from November to March) enabling the use of two PBY-5A Canso amphibian aircraft. The expedition successfully surveyed 40,000 square miles (100,000 km^{2}), about 70% of the contract area – including all of the South Shetlands Islands, the Palmer Archipelago, the Biscoe Group, and Graham Land down to the 64th parallel. The missing 30% largely comprised the featureless ice-cap of the Graham Land plateau. As well as aerial photography, the expedition also established scaling and triangulation control points on the ground, so that the exact location of features could be fixed.

As a result of their work Saffery, and the pilots and navigators of Hunting Aerosurveys, received the Johnston Memorial Trophy, awarded annually for the most outstanding feat or performance in aerial navigation, for the development of principles of air navigation, or for flights involving the development of the technology of navigation. The award was made on the quayside at Harwich on 13 May 1957 by John Lankester Parker on behalf of the Guild of Air Pilots and Air Navigators.

Following his eventual retirement Saffery spent much of his time in a workshop on Shoreham Aerodrome, designing and building light aircraft. He died in his sleep, aged 77, the day before he was due to attend the 56th Annual Reunion Dinner of the Antarctic Club.
