= Blackhead Bay =

Natural bay in Newfoundland and Labrador, Canada

Coordinates: 48.583°N 53.264°W

Blackhead Bay is a natural bay off the island of Newfoundland in the province of Newfoundland and Labrador, Canada. It is a side bay of Bonavista Bay.
