= Ross Pass =

Mountain pass in South Georgia

Ross Pass (54°32′S 36°15′W) is a narrow but well-defined pass between the southeast end of the Allardyce Range and the northwest end of the Salvesen Range in South Georgia. The pass is 610 m high and provides a sledging route between Ross Glacier and Brogger Glacier. It was first mapped in 1882–83 by the German group of the International Polar Year Investigations who referred to it as "Gletscher-Joch" (meaning glacier yoke). The name Ross Pass, which derives from association with nearby Ross Glacier, was given by the SGS following their survey of 1951–52.
