= Mount Waugh =

Mountain in Graham Land, Antarctica

Mount Waugh (65°31′S 64°7′W) is a mountain, 585 m, standing at the south side of Beascochea Bay 3.5 nautical miles (6 km) northeast of Nunez Point, on the west coast of Graham Land. First charted by the French Antarctic Expedition under Charcot, 1908–10. Named by the United Kingdom Antarctic Place-Names Committee (UK-APC) in 1959 for W.A. Waugh, American biochemist who, with Charles Glen King, first identified the antiscorbutic component from lemon juice, making possible the production of synthetic vitamin C to prevent scurvy, in 1932.
