= Trollhul =

Coordinates: 54°49′S 36°12′W

Trollhul is a small cove 4 nautical miles (7 km) northwest of Cape Disappointment at the mouth of Graae Glacier, along the south coast of South Georgia.

Trollhul was surveyed by the South Georgia Survey in the period 1951–57. The name is well established in local use.

The name is Norwegian and means "troll hollow".
