= Tadpole Island =

Island in Graham Land, Antarctica

- Location within Antarctica Location within Antarctic Peninsula

Geography
- Location: Antarctica
- Coordinates: 65°56′S 65°19′W

Administration
- Administered under the Antarctic Treaty System

Demographics
- Population: Uninhabited

Tadpole Island is an island just north of Ferin Head, off the west coast of Graham Land. Charted by the British Graham Land Expedition (BGLE) under Rymill, 1934–37. The name, given by the United Kingdom Antarctic Place-Names Committee (UK-APC) in 1959, is descriptive of the island's shape when seen from the air.

== See also ==
- List of Antarctic and sub-Antarctic islands
