= Tønsberg Point =

Tønsberg Point (54°10′S 36°39′W) is the east extremity of a low rocky peninsula which projects into Stromness Bay, South Georgia, separating Stromness Harbor on the north from Husvik Harbor on the south. The name was in use as early as 1912 and derives from the Tønsberg Hvalfangeri, a Norwegian whaling company which worked at Husvik Harbor.
