= Extension Reef =

Coordinates: 65°58′S 66°8′W

Extension Reef is a reef which encompasses a large number of small islands and rocks, extending 10 miles (16 km) southwest from the south end of Rabot Island, in the Biscoe Islands. It was first charted and named by the British Graham Land Expedition, 1934–37, under John Rymill.
