= Petter Bay =

Petter Bay (60°43′S 45°10′W) is a bight 0.5 nautical miles (0.9 km) south of Spence Harbor along the east coast of Coronation Island, in the South Orkney Islands. This coast was roughly charted by Captain George Powell and Captain Nathaniel Palmer in December 1821. The name Petters Bay appears on a chart drawn by Captain Petter Sorlle in 1912 and corrected by Hans Borge in 1913. It seems likely that this name was first used by Borge and commemorates Captain Sorlle.
