= Trump Islands (Antarctica) =

Small island group

Trump Islands (66°02.19′S 65°57.53′W) is a small group of islands lying 4 nautical miles (7 km) southwest of Dodman Island, off the west coast of Graham Land, Antarctica. The islands were discovered and named by the British Graham Land Expedition (BGLE), 1934–37, under Rymill.

== See also ==
- List of Antarctic and sub-Antarctic islands
