= Søren Berntsen =

Søren Berntsen (1880–1940) was an important figure in the history of whaling in South Georgia and the South Sandwich Islands. Arriving in the islands with the floating factory ship Bucentaur, Berntsen established the shore station at Husvik in 1910, and became the first manager of it. The station operated until the 1930s.
