= Tent Nunatak =

Tent Nunatak (67°36′S 65°21′W) is a conspicuous pyramidal nunatak marking the south limit of Whirlwind Inlet on the east coast of Graham Land. First seen and photographed from the air by the United States Antarctic Service (USAS), in 1940, and described as a "distinctive tentshaped rock nunatak." It was charted by the Falkland Islands Dependencies Survey (FIDS) in 1947.
