= Lahille Island =

Island in Graham Land, Antarctica

- Location within Antarctica

Geography
- Location: Antarctica
- Coordinates: 65°33′S 64°23′W

Administration
- Administered under the Antarctic Treaty System

Demographics
- Population: Uninhabited

Lahille Island is an island 6 kilometres (3 nmi) long, lying 4 kilometres (2 nmi) west of Nunez Point off the west coast of Graham Land, Antarctica. It was discovered by the French Antarctic Expedition, 1903–05, and charted as a point on the coast which Jean-Baptiste Charcot named after Argentine naturalist Fernando Lahille (1861–1940). Charcot's later expedition, 1908–10, determined the feature to be an island.

== See also ==
- List of Antarctic and sub-Antarctic islands
