= Black Head (Graham Land) =

Black Head (66°06′00″S 65°37′00″W) is a dark headland marking the south side of the entrance to Holtedahl Bay, on the west coast of Graham Land. It was first mapped and given this descriptive name by the British Graham Land Expedition under Rymill, 1934–37.
