= UK Antarctic Place-Names Committee =

One of the naming committees for Antarctica

The UK Antarctic Place-Names Committee (or UK-APC) is a United Kingdom government committee, part of the Foreign and Commonwealth Office, responsible for recommending names of geographical locations within the British Antarctic Territory (BAT) and the South Georgia and the South Sandwich Islands (SGSSI). Such names are formally approved by the Commissioners of the BAT and SGSSI respectively and published in the BAT Gazetteer and the SGSSI Gazetteer maintained by the Committee. The BAT names are also published in the international Composite Gazetteer of Antarctica maintained by SCAR.

The Committee may also consider proposals for new place names for geographical features in areas of Antarctica outside BAT and SGSSI, which are referred to other Antarctic place-naming authorities or decided by the Committee itself if situated in the unclaimed sector of Antarctica.

== Names attributed by the committee ==
- Anvil Crag, named for descriptive features
- Anckorn Nunataks, named after J. F. Anckorn
- Bachstrom Point, named after Johann Bachstrom, author
- Baldred Rock, originally named Bass Rock and renamed in 1954 after Saint Baldred
- Bamber Glacier, named after Jonathan Bamber
- Barrett Buttress, named after Richard G. Barrett, surveyor
- Basilisk Crag, named for descriptive features
- Bergel Rock, named after Alexandra Bergel
- Bernard Rocks, named after Claude Bernard, French physiologist
- Berntsen Ridge, named after Captain Søren Berntsen
- Binary Peaks, originally named Doppelspitz; the new name was recommended in 1971
- Blechnum Peaks, named after the rare fern Blechnum penna-marina, native to the region.
- Blyth Spur, named John Blyth, cook
- Bone Glacier, named after Douglas Bone
- Bonner Beach, named after Nigel Bonner zoologist and Antarctic mammal specialist. Breeding ground for Weddell seals.
- Bordal Rock, named after Harald Bordal, gunner
- Boreas Peak, named after Boreas
- Bothy Bay, named for descriptive features
- Boutan Rocks, named after Louis Marie-Auguste Boutan (1859–1934), French naturalist
- Boyer Rocks, named after Joseph Boyer, French naval officer
- Breccia Crags, named after geographic features
- Bremner Glacier, named after Steven Bremner
- Buddington Peak, named after James W. Buddington
- Burns Bluff, named after Frederick M. Burns, geophysicist
- Burton Cove, named after Robert W. Burton, British Antarctic Survey assistant
- Buzfuz Rock, named after Sergeant Buzfuz, a character in Charles Dickens' The Pickwick Papers
- Cabrial Rock, named after Frank Cabrial, steward
- Camana Rock, named after the Camana sailing vessel
- Canis Heights, named after the constellations of Canis Major and Canis Minor
- Canso Rocks, named after the Canso aircraft
- Capella Rocks, named after the star Capella
- Cape Fothergill, named after Alastair Fothergill
- Cape Zumberge, named after its association with James Zumberge
- Capstan Rocks, named after its resemblance to a capstan
- Catcher Icefall, named for its association with the whaling industry
- Cetacea Rocks, named after the zoological order Cetacea
- Catodon Rocks, named after the sperm whale, Physeter catodon
- Cauldron Pool, named after geographical features
- Chance Rock, named after geographical features
- Chapman Hump, named in conjunction with Chapman Glacier
- Chisel Peak, named for descriptive features
- Copestake Peak, named after Paul Goodall-Copestake, biological assistant
- Corelli Horn, named after Arcangelo Corelli, Italian composer
- Cornice Channel, named for geographical features
- Cornwall Peaks, originally named Cornwall Peak (singular); name changed in 1954
- Corr Dome, named for Hugh Corr
- Cruchley Ice Piedmont, renamed in 1987
- Cuthbertson Snowfield, named after William Cuthbertson, artist
- Davies Heights, named after Robert E.S. Davies, geologist
- Davies Top, named after Anthony G. Davies, medical officer
- Dikstra Buttresses, named after Barry James Dikstra, geophysicist
- Diver Point, named for geographic features
- Dixey Rock, named after David J. Dixey
- Dixon Peak, named after Lieutenant John B. Dixon, Royal Navy
- Donnachie Cliff, named after Thomas Donnachie, radio operator
- Downham Peak, named after Noel Y. Downham, meteorological assistant
- Dreadnought Point, named for descriptive features
- Dudeney Nunataks, named for John Dudeney
- Duparc Rocks, named after Louis Duparc, French naval officer
- Elliott Rock, named after Henry W. Elliott, American naturalist
- Ewer Pass, named after John R. Ewer, meteorological observer
- Fang Buttress, named for descriptive features
- Fantome Rock
- Farman Highland, named after Joseph C. Farman, atmospheric physicist
- The Fid, named for descriptive features
- Fielding Col, named after Harold M. Fielding, surveyor
- Finback Massif, named after the finback whale
- Fishhook Ridge, named for descriptive features
- Flatcap Point, named for descriptive features
- Fleet Point, named after Michael Fleet
- Flett Buttress, named after William R. Flett, geologist
- Förster Cliffs, named after Reinhard Förster, West German geologist
- Foxtail Peak, named for geographic features
- Francis Peak, named for Jane Francis
- Freberg Rocks, named after Hjalmar Freberg, gunner
- Fricker Ice Piedmont, named after Helen Amanda Fricker
- Fringe Rocks, named for geographical location
- Frost Rocks, named after Richard Frost, survey assistant
- Fulmar Bay, named after the Fulmarus glacialoides that nest in the area
- Fulmar Crags
- Gaudin Point, named after Marc Antoine Gaudin, French photographer
- Gazella Peak, named after the Arctocephalus gazella
- Geelan Ice Piedmont, named after Patrick John Michael Geelan
- Gemel Peaks, originally named Twin Peaks and renamed in 1960
- Gerber Peak, named after Friedrich Gerber, Swiss veterinary surgeon
- Gervaize Rocks, named after Charles Gervaize, French naval officer
- Giles Bay, named after Katherine Giles
- Glass Point, named after R.H. Glass
- Gordon Nunataks, named after Arnold L. Gordon, American oceanographer
- Grinder Rock, named for descriptive features
- Hauron Peak, named for French cinematographer Louis Arthur Ducos du Hauron
- Haller Rocks, named after Albrecht von Haller, Swiss physiologist
- Hamer Hill, named after Richard D. Hamer, geologist
- Hampton Bluffs, named after Ian F.G. Hampton, physiologist
- Hardy Rocks, named after James D. Hardy, American physiologist
- Haverly Peak, named after William R. Haverly
- Headland Peak, named after Robert K. Headland, biological assistant
- Hektor Icefall, named for the Hektor Whaling Company
- Henriksen Buttress, named after Henrik N. Henriksen
- Heywood Glacier, named after Karen Heywood
- Highton Glacier, named after John E. Highton
- Hindley Glacier, named after Christopher Hindley
- Hindmarsh Dome, named after Richard Hindmarsh
- Hobbs Point, named after Graham J. Hobbs, geologist
- Homing Head, named for descriptive features
- Hornpipe Heights, named in conjunction with Whistle Pass
- Hoskins Peak, named after Arthur K. Hoskins, geologist
- Hospital Point, originally called Rocky Point and renamed in 1961
- Hübl Peak, named after Artur Freiherr von Hübl, Austrian surveyor
- Huddle Rocks, named for descriptive features
- Humpback Rocks, originally named Knolrokset and renamed in 1954
- Humphries Heights, named after Colonel G.J. Humphries
- Hurst Bay, named after Commander William E. Hurst, Royal Navy
- Husdal, named for the Husvik whaling station
- Hyatt Cove, named after Raymond H. Hyatt
- Hydrurga Rocks, named after Hydrurga leptonyx, the leopard seal
- Jardine Peak, named after D. Jardine, geologist
- Jeffries Bluff, named after Margaret Elsa Jeffries
- Jeffries Peak, named after John Jeffries, American physician
- Kerr Point, named after Adam J. Kerr
- Killermet Cove
- King Glacier, named after John King
- King Dome, named after Edward King
- Kinzl Crests, named after Hans Kinzl, Austrian glaciologist
- Kjellstrøm Rock, named after Johan Kjellstrøm, gunner
- Knuckle Reef, named for geographical features
- Kramer Rocks, named after J.G.H. Kramer, an Austrian army physician
- Kuno Point, named after Yasau Kuno, a Japanese physiologist
- Ladkin Glacier, named for Russell Scott Ladkin
- Landing Cove, named for descriptive features
- Larssen Peak, named after Harald Larssen, manager
- Lawrence Channel, named after Captain Stuart J. Lawrence
- Laxon Bay, named after Seymour Laxon
- Lomas Ridge, named after Simon Andrew Lomas, geologist
- Lorn Rocks, named for descriptive features
- Lyell Lake, named in conjunction with Lyell Glacier, South Georgia
- Mackworth Rock, named after Norman H. Mackworth, British experimental psychologist
- Marker Rock, named for geographical features
- McCollum Peak, named after Elmer V. McCollum, American biochemist
- Menelaus Ridge, named for Menelaus, husband of Helen
- The Menhir, named for geographic features
- Miller Heights, named after Ronald Miller
- Molley Corner, named after William Molley
- Molnar Rocks, named after George W. Molnar, American physiologist
- Morris Glacier, named after Elizabeth M. Morris
- Morton Cliff, named after British Antarctic Survey field assistant Ashley Morton
- Mount Antell, named after Georg Antell
- Mount Back, named after Anthony H. Back
- Mount Berry, named after "Captain" Albert Berry, American parachutist
- Mount Cortés, named after Martín Cortés de Albacar, Spanish author
- Mount Cox, named after Nicholas Cox
- Mount Dow, named after George F. Dow, American whaling historian
- Mount Eastman, named after George Eastman, American entrepreneur
- Mount Fagerli, named after Soren Fagerli
- Mount Fiennes, named after Lady Virginia (Ginny) Twistleton-Fiennes
- Mount Goldring, named after Denis C. Goldring, geologist
- Mount Gunter, named after Edmund Gunter, English mathematician
- Mount Markab, named after the Markab star
- Mount Walker
- Mudge Passage, named after Thomas Mudge, horologist
- Mulvaney Promontory, named after Robert Mulvaney
- Nodule Nunatak, named for descriptive features
- Northtrap Rocks, named for location
- Olsen Rock, named after Soren Olsen, gunner
- Pinnock Nunataks, named after Michael Pinnock
- Platt Cliffs, named after Eric Platt
- Pollux Nunatak, named for its association with Castor Nunatak
- Pudsey Bay, named after Carol Pudsey
- Riley Peak, named after Teal Riley, geologist
- Rigsby Islands, named after George P. Rigsby, geologist
- Rodger Nunataks, named after Alan Rodger
- Ronne Ice Shelf, named for its association with Edith Ronne
- Shostakovich Peninsula, named for Dmitri Shostakovich
- Scud Rock, named for geographic features
- Shanklin Glacier, named after Jonathan Shanklin
- Shull Rocks, named for Clifford G. Shull, American physicist who used neutron diffraction to determine the position of the hydrogen atoms in ice.
- Southtrap Rock, named for geographic features
- Stark Rock, named for descriptive features
- Taylor Buttresses, named after Brian J. Taylor
- Turner Inlet, named after John Turner
- Tolly Nunatak, named after Guðfinna 'Tollý' Aðalgeirsdóttir
- Vertigo Cliffs, named for descriptive features
- Vogel Peak, named after Dr. P. Vogel
- Wollan Island, named after Ernest O. Wollan, American physicist who used neutron diffraction to study the structure of ice.

== See also ==
- SCAR Composite Gazetteer of Antarctica
- Australian Antarctic Names and Medals Committee
