= Elephant (disambiguation) =

An elephant is a large, grey mammal native to Africa and southern Asia.

Elephant may also refer to:

== Arts and entertainment ==
=== Film and television ===
- Elephant (1989 film), directed by Alan Clarke
- Elephant (1993 film), a public information film about seat belt use in the UK
- Elephant (2003 film), directed by Gus Van Sant
- Elephant (2020 film), a Disney nature documentary
- "The Elephant" (Bagpuss), a 1974 children's television episode
- "Elephants", a Series E episode of the television series QI (2007)

=== Music ===
- Elephant (album), a 2003 album by the White Stripes
- L'Éléphant, a movement of The Carnival of the Animals by Saint-Saëns
- "Elephant" (Alexandra Burke song), a 2012 song by Alexandra Burke
- "Elephant" (Margaret song), a 2016 song by Margaret
- "Elephants" (song), a 2008 song by Warpaint
- "L'Elephant", a song from the album Tom Tom Club by Tom Tom Club
- "Elephant", a song from the album 9 by Damien Rice
- "Elephant" (Tame Impala song), a 2012 song by Tame Impala and covered by the Wiggles in 2021
- "Elephants", a song from the album Them Crooked Vultures by Them Crooked Vultures
- "Elephant", a song from the 2012 album Hannah Georgas by Hannah Georgas
- "Elephant", a song from the album Excellent Italian Greyhound by Shellac
- "Elephant", a song by Zzbra from the album Zzbra: Original Motion Picture Soundtrack, 2012
- "The Elephant Song" (song), a 1975 song by Kamahl

=== Other ===
- The Elephant (sculpture), a 1934 sculpture in Szczecin, Poland
- The Elephants (Los Elefantes), a 1948 painting by Salvador Dalí
- Elephant and Other Stories, a 1988 story collection by Raymond Carver

== Places ==
=== Antarctica ===
- Elephant Flats, Signy Island
- Elephant Island, South Shetland Islands
- Elephant Moraine, Victoria Land
- Elephant Point, Livingston Island
- Elephant Ridge, Alexander Island
- Elephant Rocks (Antarctica), Palmer Archipelago

=== Subantarctic ===
- Elephant Cays, Falkland Islands
- Elephant Cove, South Georgia
- Elephant Lagoon, South Georgia
- Elephant Spit, Heard Island

=== United States ===
- Elephant, Pennsylvania, an unincorporated community
- Elephant Arch, a sandstone formation in Utah
- Elephant Butte (Arches National Park)
- Elephant Mountain (Oxford County, Maine)
- Elephant Mountain (Piscataquis County, Maine)
- Elephant Peak, a mountain in Montana
- Elephant Point (Alaska)
- Elephants Tooth, a pillar in Arizona

=== Elsewhere ===
- Mount Elephant, Victoria, Australia
- Dâmrei Mountains (Elephant Mountains), Cambodia
- Elephant and Castle, an area of London, England, informally called "the Elephant"
- The Elephant, a mountain in Milford Sound, New Zealand
- Elephant Rock (disambiguation)

== Buildings ==
- Elephant Building, a high-rise in Bangkok, Thailand
- Elephant Packing House, Fullerton, California
- Edward Gorey House, also known as Elephant House, Cape Cod, Massachusetts
- Elephant Hotel, Somers, New York

== Military uses ==
- Olifant (tank), main battle tank of the South African Army
- Elefant, German WWII tank destroyer
- HMS Elephant, the name of various British Royal Navy ships
- Martinsyde G.100 "Elephant", a British First World War bomber aircraft
- 103 Squadron (Israel) or the Elephants Squadron
- Operation Elephant, part of the World War II Battle for the Kapelsche Veer in the Netherlands

== Business ==
- Elephant.co.uk, a UK motor insurance company
- Elephant Memory Systems, a computer floppy disk manufacturer
- Elephant Field, an oilfield in Libya's Murzuq Basin
- Elephant Gate and Tower, Carlsberg
- Elephant beer, a beer brewed by Carlsberg Brewery of Denmark

== Sports and games ==
- Ivory Coast national football team, nicknamed the Elephants
- Elephant Rally, a motorcycle rally in Germany
- Elephant Gambit, a rarely used chess opening
- Alfil, a fairy chess piece also known as an elephant

== Other uses ==
- Al-Fil ("The Elephant"), the 105th sura of the Qur'an
- Elephant (pharaoh), an ancient Egyptian protodynastic ruler
- Elephant seal, two species of large seals in the genus Mirounga
- Elephant (de Camp book), a science book by L. Sprague de Camp
- Elephant, a digital fat face typeface
- Elephant folio, a book size
- Order of the Elephant, the highest order of Denmark
- The Elephant, a nickname for the 426 cu in Chrysler V8 engine
- White elephant, an idiom for impractical possessions that are expensive and hard to dispose of
- Elephant in the room, an idiom for a large and obvious but unmentioned problem

== See also ==
- HDMS Elefanten, the name of various Royal Danish Navy ships
- ElePHPant, the mascot of the PHP scripting/programming language project
- Elefant (disambiguation)
- Oliphant (disambiguation), derived from an archaic spelling
