= African elephant (disambiguation) =

African elephants are a genus of elephant, Loxodonta.

African Elephant may also refer to:

- African bush elephant, L. africana
- African forest elephant, L. cyclotis
- African Elephant (sculpture), a 1982 steel sculpture by Robert Fowler
- African Elephants (album), a 2009 album by Dead to Me

== See also ==
- Elephant (disambiguation)
