= Lewis Glacier =

Lewis Glacier may refer to:

- Lewis Glacier (Antarctica)
- Lewis Glacier (Oregon), US
- Lewis Glacier (Washington), US
- Lewis Glacier, on Mount Kenya, Kenya

== See also ==
- Rubble Glacier or Louis Glacier, Antarctica
