= Elefant (disambiguation) =

Elefant was a German World War II tank destroyer.

Elefant, the spelling of elephant in several languages, may also refer to:

- Elefant (band), an American indie rock band
- Elefant Records, a Spanish record label
- SLT 50 Elefant, a tractor unit and tank transporter of the modern German Army
- Seeteufel, or Elefant, a prototype German submarine
- Zechariah Elefant (1886–1957), Hungarian rabbi, author, and publisher

== See also ==
- Elephant (disambiguation)
- Oliphant (disambiguation)
