= Supalai Park Towers =

Three Thai high-rise buildings

Supalai Towers
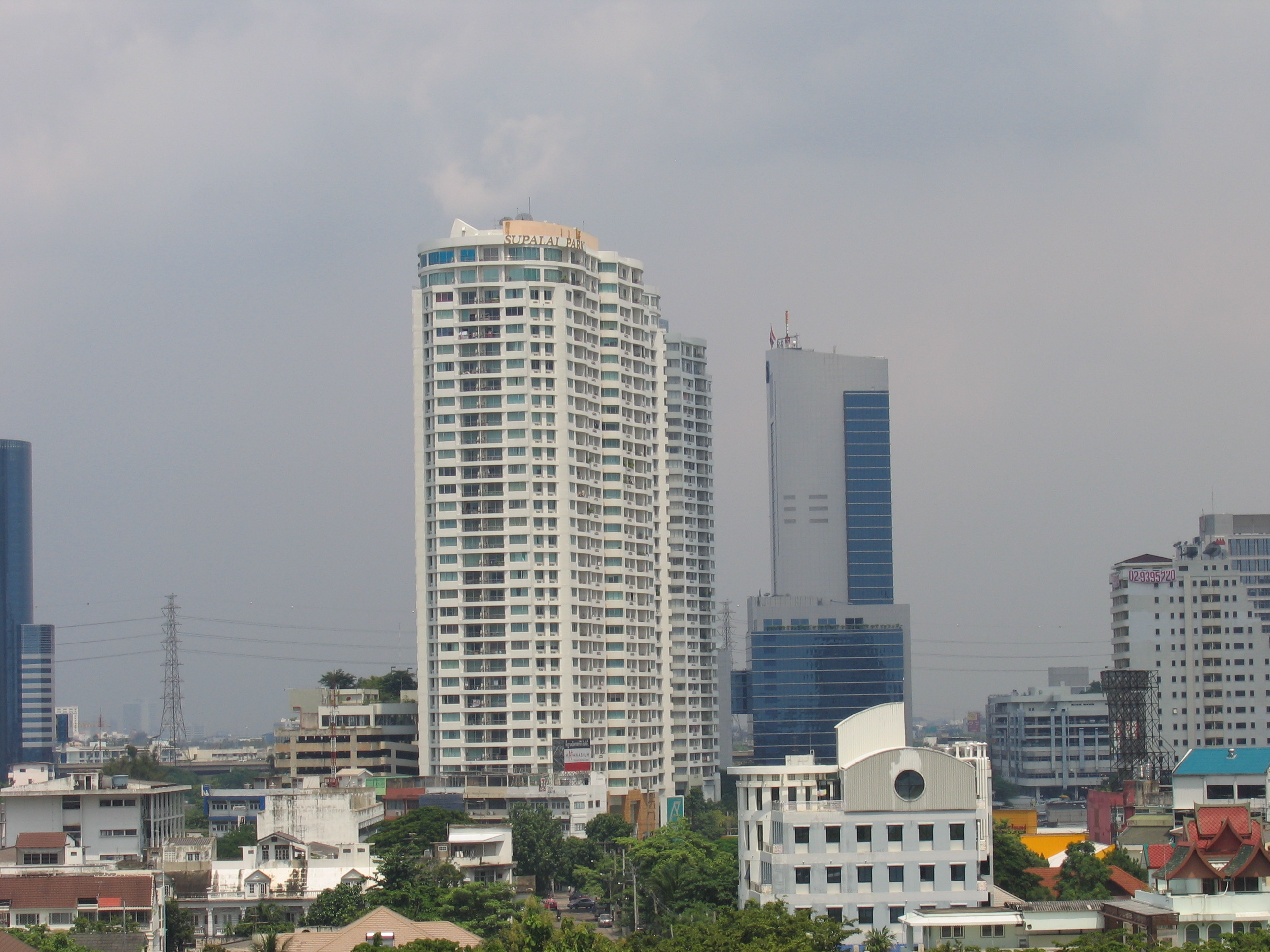
- Supalai Towers
- Interactive map of the Supalai Towers area

General information
- Status: Completed
- Location: Chatuchak, Bangkok, Thailand
- Coordinates: 13.8229°N 100.5643°E
- Completed: 2003

Height
- Top floor: 34

Technical details
- Floor count: 33 floors

Supalai Park Towers are 3 residential high-rise buildings located on Soi Phahonyothin 21, Chatuchak district, Bangkok, Thailand. The three towers have 33 floors and were all completed in 2003. Opposite Supalai Park Towers is the Elephant Building, and next to the towers lies a new co-development project with Grand Canal Land, a Central Pattana subsidiary.

== Transportation ==
- BTS Skytrain (Sukhumvit Line) - Phahonyothin 24 Station
- MRT (Blue Line) - Phahon Yothin Station
