= Oliphant =

Olifant, Oliphant, Olyphant and similar variations may refer to:

== Geography ==
- Oliphant, Ontario, Canada, a community
- Oliphant Islands, South Orkney Islands
- Olifants River (Limpopo), South Africa
- Olifants River (Southern Cape), South Africa
- Olifants River (Western Cape), South Africa
- Olifants Water Management Area, South Africa
- Olyphant, Pennsylvania, a borough in Pennsylvania, United States

== People ==
- Oliphant (surname), a list of notable people with this name
- Oliphant Chuckerbutty (1884–1960), British organist and composer
- Clan Oliphant, a Highland Scottish clan
- Pat Oliphant, U.S. political cartoonist and artist, whose works were frequently signed with only his surname

== Arts, entertainment, and media ==
- Oliphant (band), a Finnish band
- Oliphant (Dungeons & Dragons), an elephant-like monster in the Dungeons & Dragons game
- Oliphaunt or mûmak, a monstrous elephant-like creature in J. R. R. Tolkien's The Lord of the Rings
- Sir Olifaunt, a vicious giant in Geoffrey Chaucer's "Tale of Sir Thopas", in The Canterbury Tales
- Eleanor Oliphant, protagonist of Gail Honeyman's novel Eleanor Oliphant Is Completely Fine (2017)

== Titles ==
- Lord Oliphant, a peerage title in Scotland
- Oliphant baronets, a title in the Baronetage of Nova Scotia

== Vehicles ==
- Olifant (tank), a South African version of the British Centurion tank

== Others ==
- Oliphant v. Suquamish Indian Tribe, a U.S. Supreme Court case deciding that Indian tribal courts have no criminal jurisdiction over non-Indians
- Olifant (instrument), a wind instrument of the Middle Ages, made from elephants' tusks
- D'Oliphant, a Dutch mansion originally built near Nieuwesluis, later moved to Rotterdam
- De Olifant, Burdaard, a windmill in the Netherlands

== See also ==
- Elefant (disambiguation)
- Elephant (disambiguation)
