= Elephant Butte (Arches National Park) =

Hill; highest point in Arches National Park, Utah

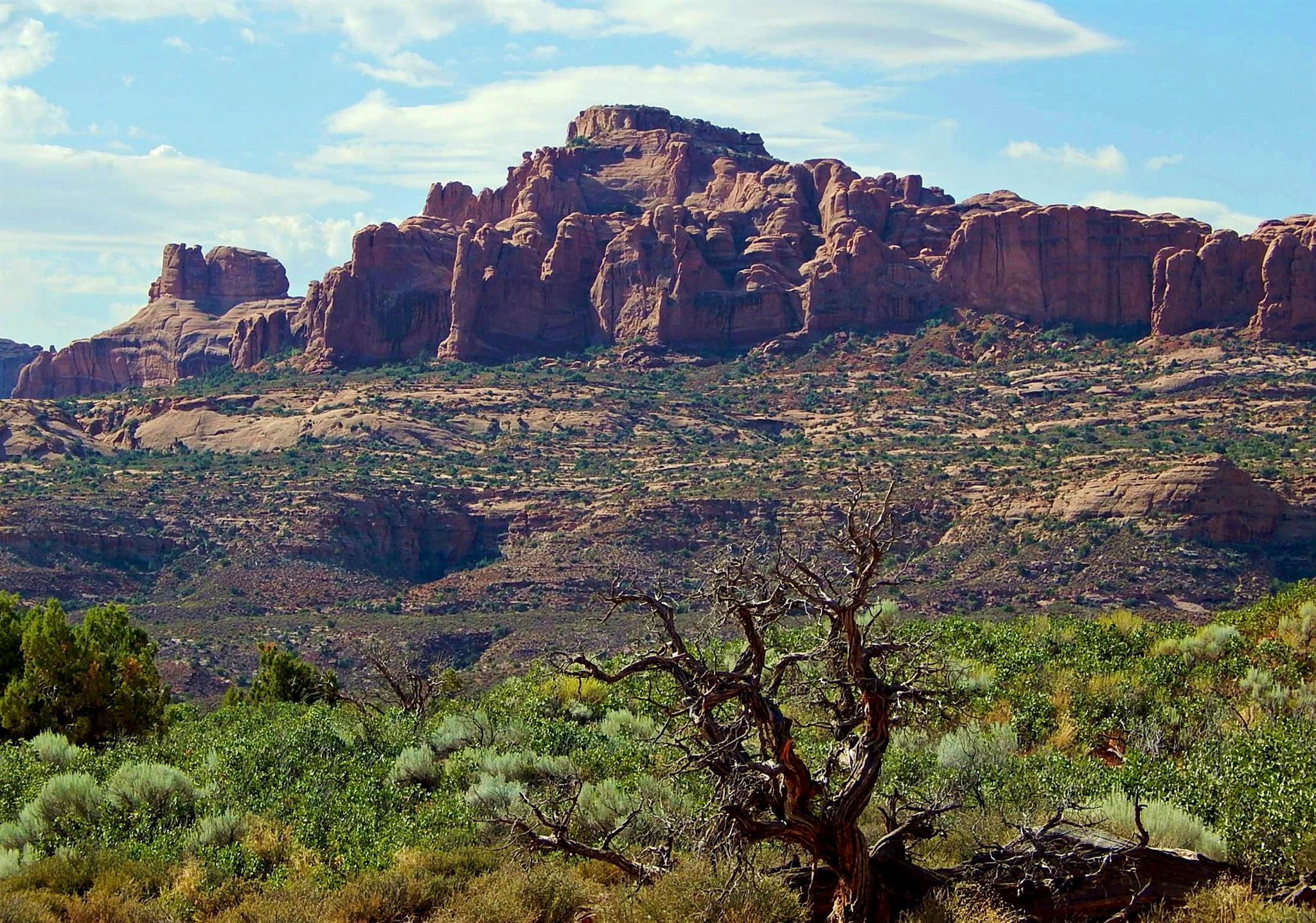
- North aspect, from Panorama Point

Highest point
- Elevation: 5,653 ft (1,723 m)
- Prominence: 823 ft (251 m)
- Parent peak: Dry Mesa (5,780 ft)
- Isolation: 6.05 mi (9.74 km)
- Coordinates: 38°41′45″N 109°32′24″W

Geography
- Location within Utah Location within the United States
- Location: Arches National Park; Grand County, Utah, U.S.
- Parent range: Colorado Plateau
- Topo map: USGS The Windows Section

Geology
- Rock type: Entrada Sandstone

Climbing
- First ascent: 1953
- Easiest route: class 5.3 climbing

Elephant Butte is a 5,653-foot (1,723 m) summit in Grand County, Utah. It is located within Arches National Park, and is the highest point in the park. Like many of the rock formations in the park, Elephant Butte is composed of Entrada Sandstone. Elephant Butte is a flat-topped cap surrounded by numerous towers and fins including Parade of Elephants. Double Arch is also a natural feature of Elephant Butte and was used as a backdrop for the opening scene of Indiana Jones and the Last Crusade. Precipitation runoff from Elephant Butte drains east into the nearby Colorado River. The first ascent was made September 8, 1953, by Alex Cresswell and Fred Ayres.

== Geology ==
Elephant Butte lies above an underground salt bed, causing the formation of the arches, spires, balanced rocks, sandstone fins, and eroded monoliths in the area. The rock is Entrada Sandstone.

== Climate ==
Spring and fall are the most favorable seasons to experience Arches National Park, when highs average 60 to 80 °F (15 to 25 °C) and lows average 30 to 50 °F (0 to 10 °C). Summer temperatures often exceed 100 °F (40 °C). Winters are cold, with highs averaging 30 to 50 °F (0 to 10 °C), and lows averaging 0 to 20 °F (−20 to −5 °C). As part of a high desert region, it can experience wide daily temperature fluctuations. The park receives an average of less than 10 inches (25 cm) of rain annually.

== Gallery ==
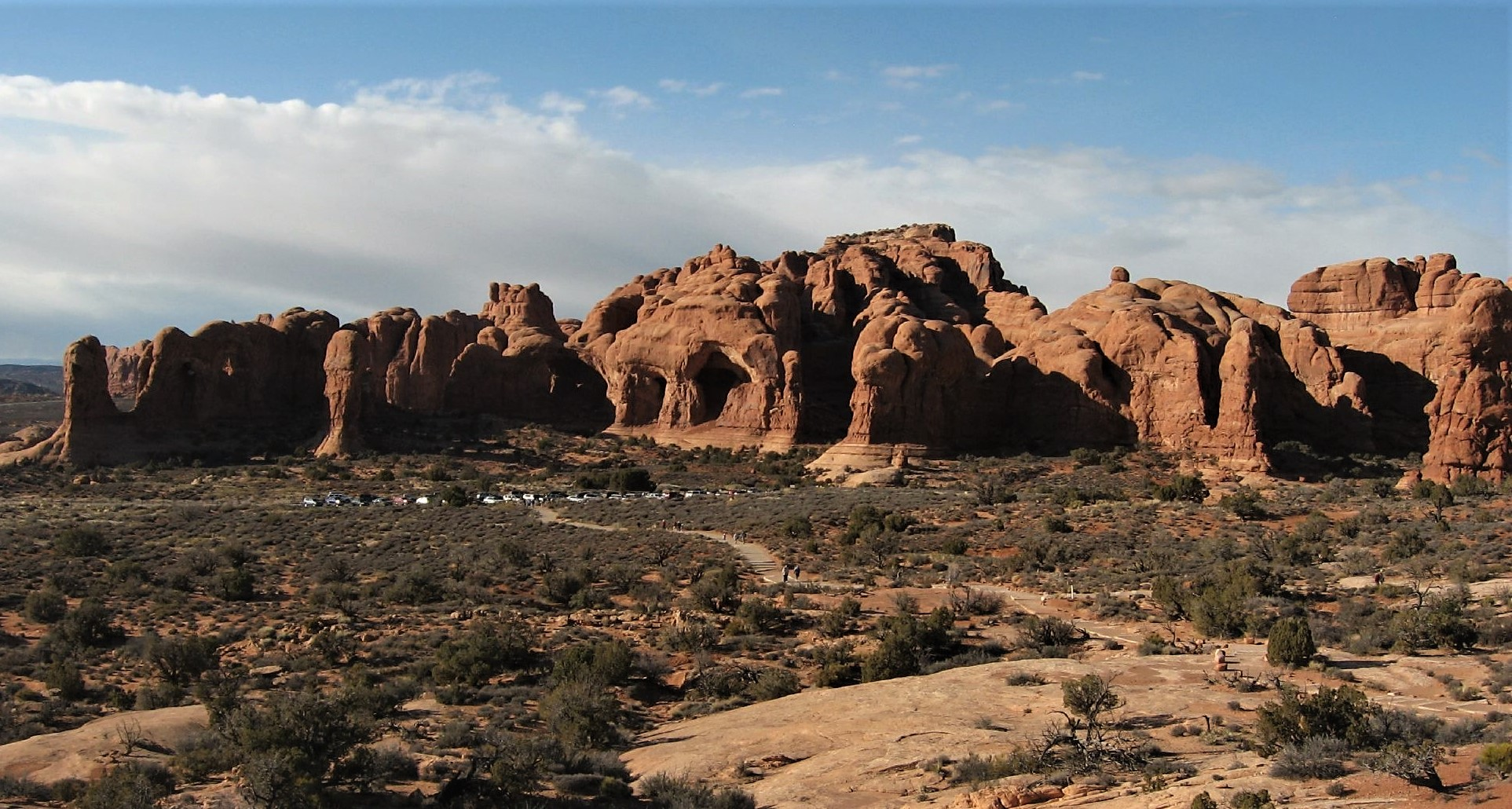
South aspect, seen from Turret Arch

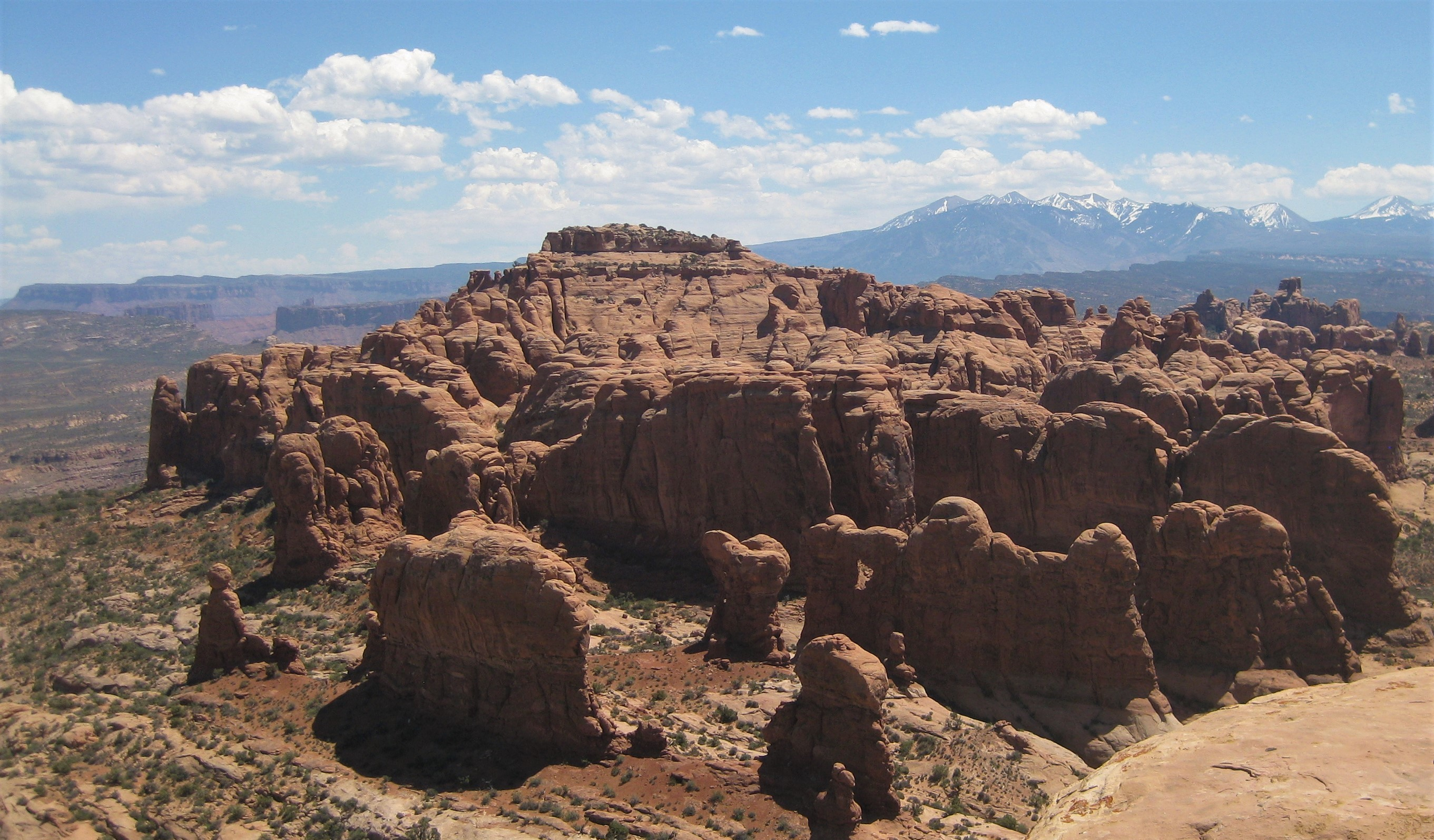
West aspect

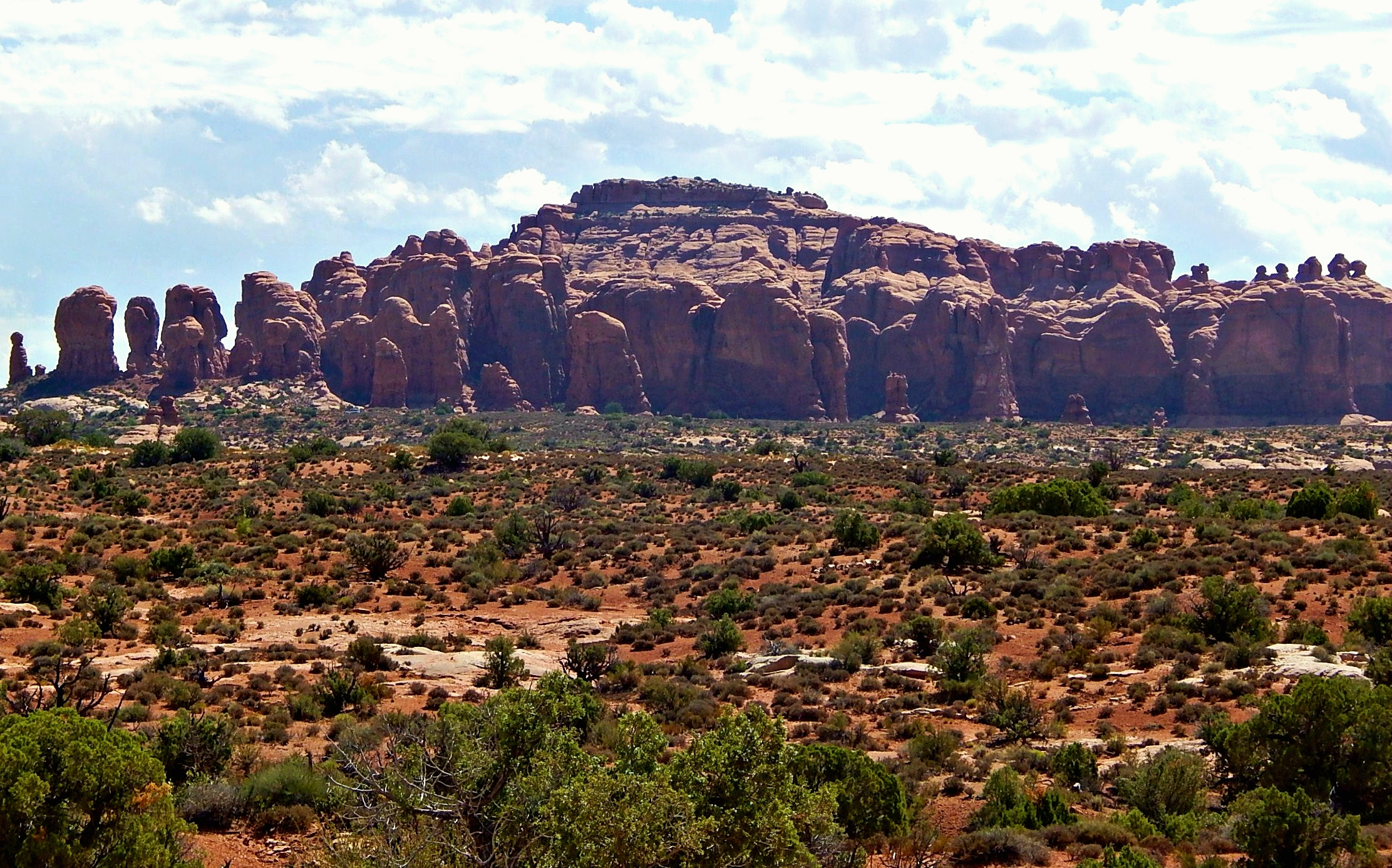
Elephant Butte and Parade of Elephants

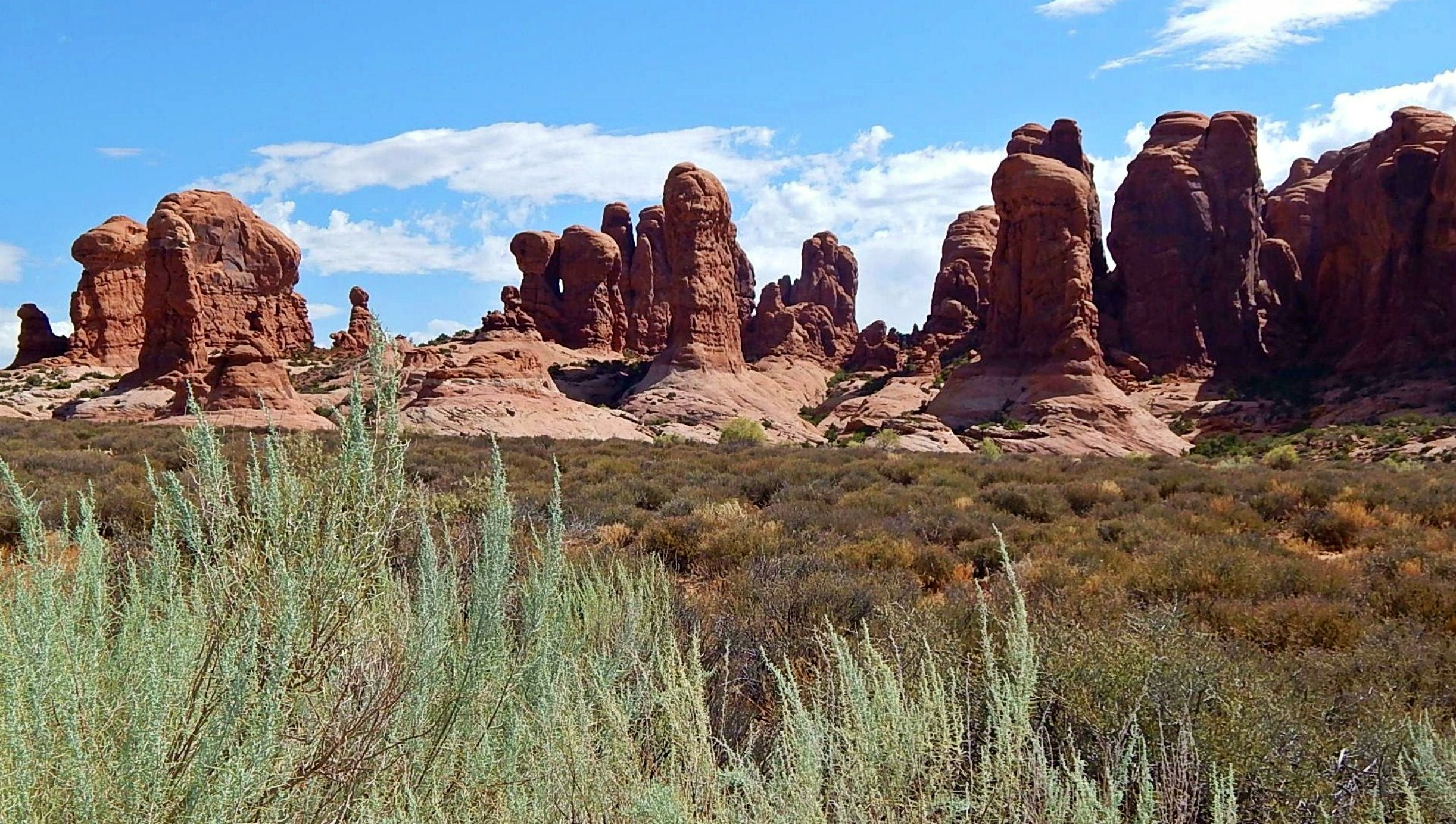
Towers surrounding Elephant Butte

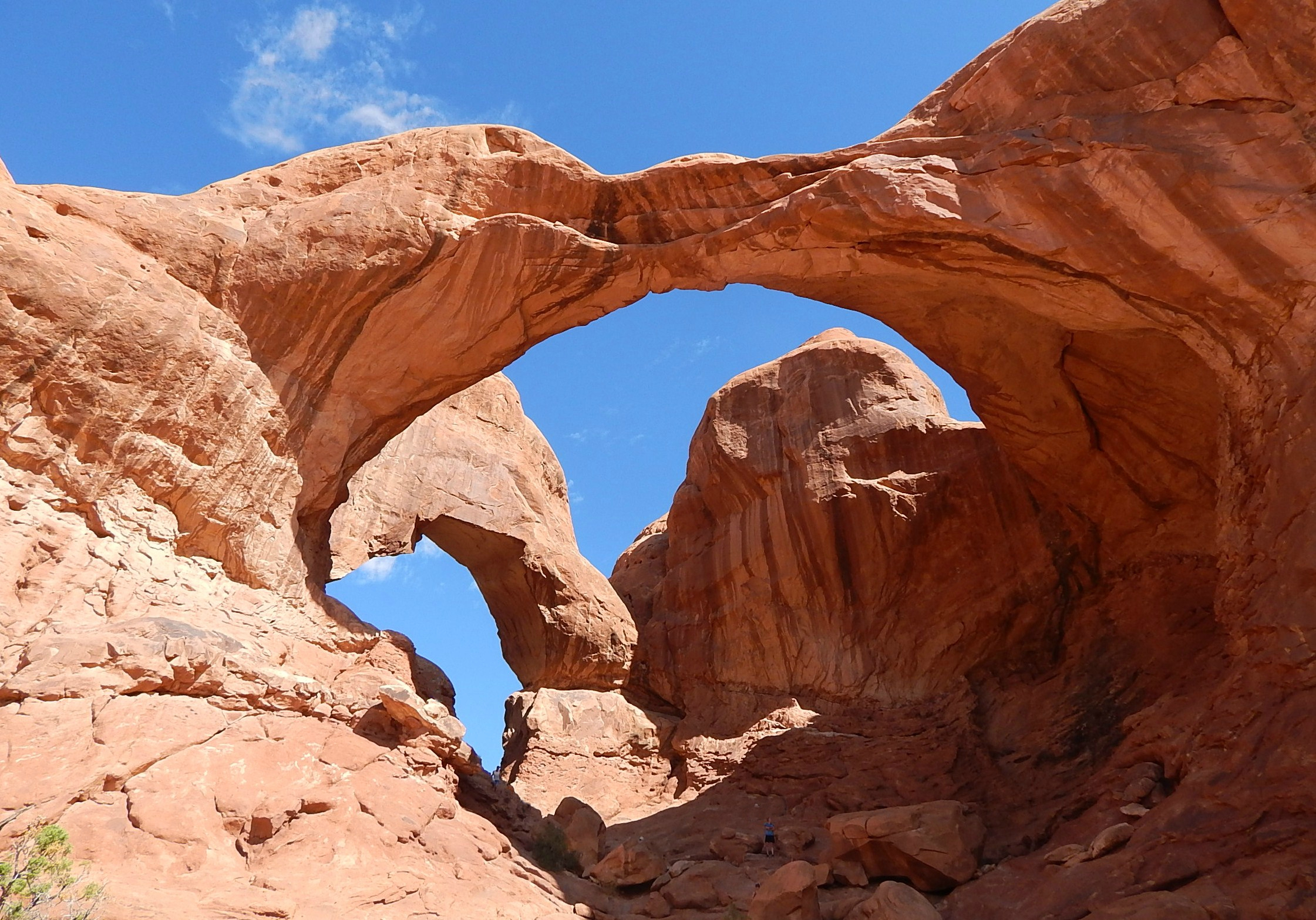
Double Arch structure on Elephant Butte

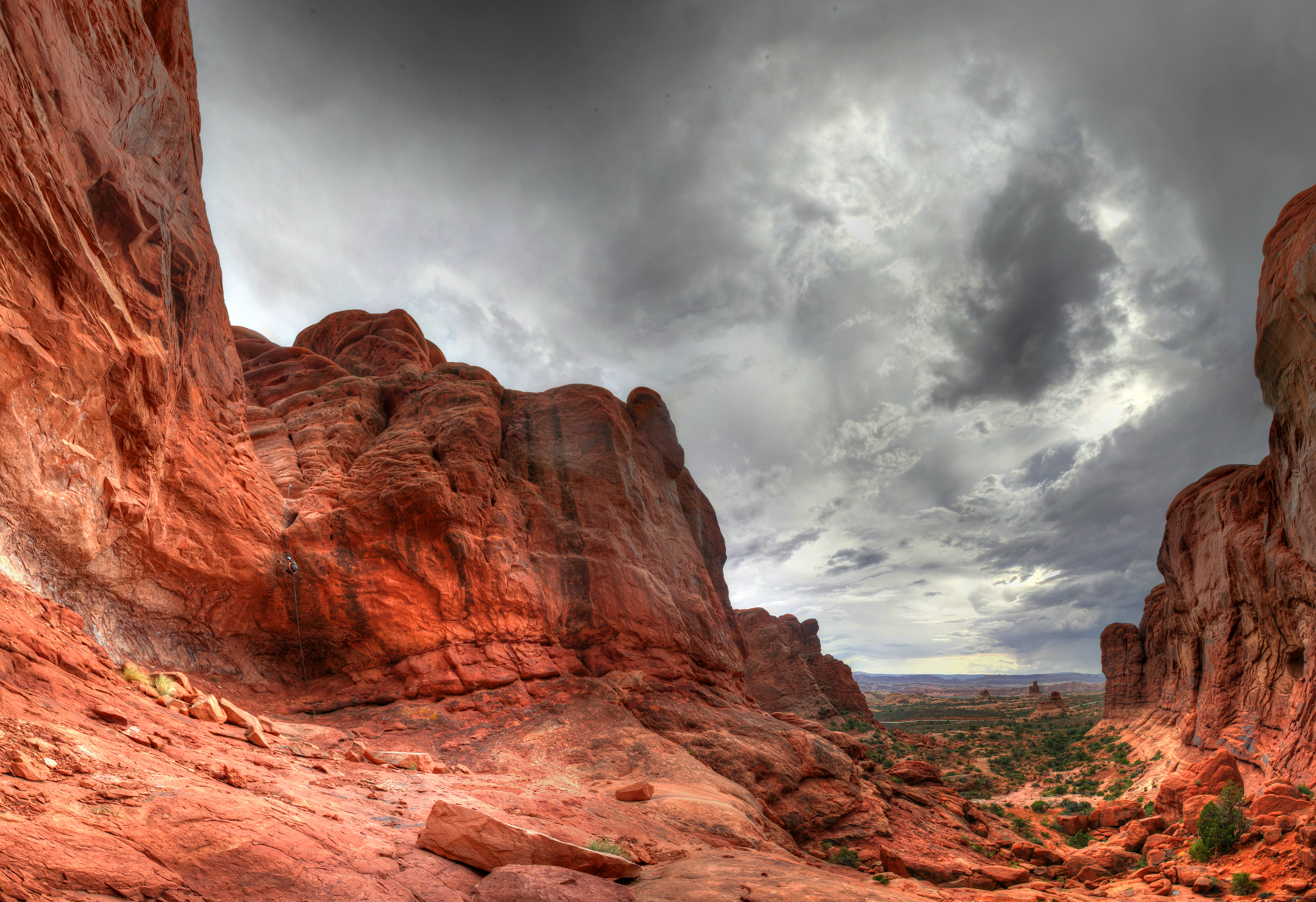
Elephant Butte exit

== See also ==
- List of mountains in Utah
- Geology of Utah
