= Anvil Stacks =

The Anvil Stacks (54°10′S 37°42′W) are two conspicuous sea stacks which lie close south of the entrance to Elephant Cove, off the south coast and near the west end of South Georgia. The name Elephant Bay Islands, derived from nearby Elephant Cove (formerly Elephant Bay), has been used locally for this feature by some South Georgia sealers. The descriptive name Anvil Stacks, a less cumbersome name, was suggested by the South Georgia Survey following their survey in 1951–52.
