= HMS Elephant =

Three ships of the British Royal Navy have been named HMS Elephant, after the elephant. Two other ships were originally given that name, but were subsequently changed.

- HMS Elephant (1705) - the first such named ship was a captured French store-ship purchased in 1705 and hulked 1709.
- HMS Elephant (1776) - a 10-gun storeship purchased 1776 and sold 1779.
- HMS Elephant (1786) - a 74-gun third-rate launched in 1786, reduced to a 58-gun fourth-rate in 1818, and broken up in 1830.
- HMS Minotaur (1863), lead ship in her class of broadside ironclad warships and known as Elephant during construction.
- HMS Hermes (R12) - aircraft carrier laid down in 1945 as HMS Elephant. Ship renamed Hermes before completion.
