= Rubble Glacier =

Glacier in Antarctica

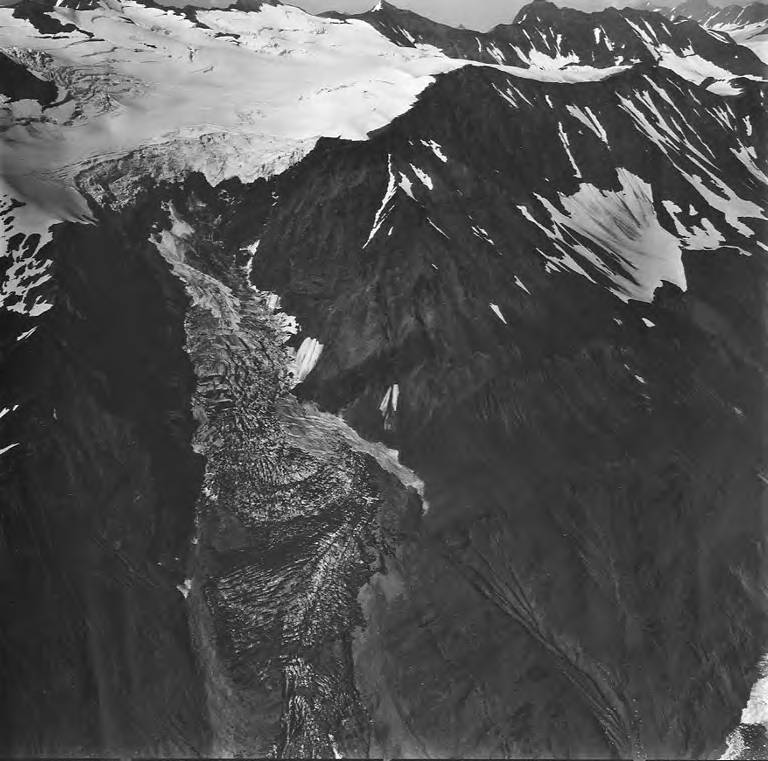
- Rubble Glacier, mountain glaciers with bergschrund on the upper glacier, September 4, 1977
- Interactive map of Rubble Glacier
- Type: Mountain glacier
- Location: Palmer Land, Antarctica
- Coordinates: 71°20′S 68°18′W

Rubble Glacier is an ice-filled valley located in the Palmer Land region of the Antarctic Peninsula. It is surrounded by Giza Peak to the north, the ridge connecting it to Baily Ridge, and Elephant Ridge to the south. Rubble Glacier was previously referred to as "Man-Pack Glacier" in scientific reports from the early 1960s, but is now commonly known as Rubble Glacier or sometimes as "Louis Glacier".
