= HMS Elephant (1776) =

British Navy storeship

History

Great Britain
- Name: HMS Elephant
- Completed: 8 September 1776
- Acquired: 17 July 1776
- Commissioned: July 1776
- In service: 1776–1779
- Out of service: 1779
- Fate: Sold at Greenock, Scotland on 2 December 1779

General characteristics
- Class & type: 10-gun storeship
- Tons burthen: 382 42/94 bm
- Length: 103 ft 3 in (31.5 m) (gun deck); 85 ft 0 in (25.9 m) (keel)
- Beam: 29 ft 1 in (8.9 m)
- Depth of hold: 11 ft 9 in (3.58 m)
- Complement: 40
- Armament: 10 × 4-pounder cannons; 8 × ½-pdr swivel guns

HMS Elephant was a 10-gun storeship of the Royal Navy which saw active service during the American Revolutionary War. Formerly a merchant vessel named Union, she was purchased by Admiralty in 1776 and sent to North America to resupply larger naval vessels in action against American rebels. She was captured by a 20-gun American privateer on 8 May 1779, following a brisk action which killed her captain and five of her crew. Retaken by the British two days later, she was sailed to Scotland where she was sold out of Navy service in December 1779.

== Construction ==
The outbreak of the American Revolutionary War in 1775, and the need to service substantial fleets at sea, strained Royal Navy resources and necessitated the purchase of additional storeships, transports and victualler vessels. As part of this process, on 13 June 1776 the Admiralty instructed the Navy Board to obtain two new ships of around 300 tons burthen, which would resupply naval vessels then operating off the Gulf of St Lawrence in North America. Only one such ship was immediately available – a merchant barque named Union, was offered for sale by shipping agent James Wilkinson, with an asking price was £9 per ton for hull, masts and yards. A Navy Board counter-offer of £6.4s per ton was refused, and on 10 July the vessel was purchased on Wilkinson's terms for £3,438. Seven days later she was brought into Deptford Dockyard where she was renamed Elephant and placed in a dry dock for fitting-out and for copper sheathing of her hull.

As built, Elephant was 103 ft 3 in (31.5 m) long with an 85 ft 0 in (25.9 m) keel, a beam of 29 ft 1 in (8.86 m), and a roomy hold depth of 11 ft 9 in (3.6 m). Her crew quarters were comfortably designed, with a headroom of between 6 ft 10 in (2.1 m) and 7 ft 2 in (2.2 m), and a captain's cabin measuring 13 ft 1 in (4.0 m). The ship as a whole measured 382 44/94 tons burthen; nearly one quarter larger than the Navy Board's specifications in making the purchase.

The merchant vessel Union had been unarmed, so dockyard workers now cut five gunports on each side of her upper deck and filled these with four-pounder cannons. Eight 1/2-pounder swivel guns were also ranged along her sides for use against enemy boarding parties. Her Admiralty-designated complement was 40, including only one commissioned officer – a lieutenant who would serve as captain. The crew comprised four warrant officers – a boatswain, a gunner, a carpenter and a surgeon – and eight petty officers, 22 naval ratings, and six servants and other ranks. (Note: The six servants and other ranks provided for in the ship's complement consisted of five personal servants and a widow's man – a fictitious crew member whose pay would be reallocated to the family of any sailors who died at sea.)

== Naval career ==
Elephant was commissioned into the Royal Navy in July 1776, as a storeship under the command of Lieutenant Benjamin Bechinoe. In 17779 her command was transferred to Lieutenant Robert Long, for service In New York harbour. On 21 April 1779 she set sail from New York for Portsmouth, and had reached Newfoundland Banks by 8 May, when she encountered the 20-gun American privateer General Mifflin. (Note: Other sources describe General Mifflin as having 26 guns.) The equally matched vessels engaged in battle over the next six hours before Elephant was surrendered with the loss of five of her crew, including Lieutenant Long. A further ten men were wounded, and they and the other survivors were taken aboard General Mifflin as prisoners.

A 14-member American prize crew took command of Elephant and set sail for the North American mainland. The voyage was unsuccessful; on 10 May the captured vessel was sighted by the Royal Navy's 74-gun third rate, HMS Hero, and was retaken after a short pursuit. which immediately recaptured her and her crew. The Americans were taken aboard Hero as prisoners and a British crew piloted the recaptured Elephant to Scotland for repairs. She made port in Greenock near Port Glasgow, in June 1779, but was declared surplus to Navy requirements four months later. She was removed from Navy lists in December 1779, and is recorded as having been sold into private hands, at Greenock, for the sum of £1,500.

== Bibliography ==
- Rodger, N. A. M. (1986). The Wooden World: An Anatomy of the Georgian Navy. Annapolis, Maryland: Naval Institute Press. ISBN 0870219871.
- Syrett, David (1988). "The Fitting Out of H. M. Storeship Elephant, July 1776". The Mariner's Mirror. 74 (1). Portsmouth, United Kingdom: Society for Nautical Research. doi:10.1080/00253359.1988.10656181.
- Winfield, Rif (2007). British Warships of the Age of Sail 1714–1792: Design, Construction, Careers and Fates. Barnsley, United Kingdom: Seaforth. ISBN 9781844157006.
