= Elephant Cove =

Elephant Cove (54°9′S 37°41′W) is a small circular cove lying 0.5 nautical miles (1 km) north of Klutschak Point along the south coast and near the west end of South Georgia. The name "Elephant Bay", probably applied by early sealers at South Georgia, was recorded on the chart of the German expedition under Kohl-Larsen, 1928–29, and the chart by Discovery Investigations personnel who mapped South Georgia in this period. Cove is considered a better descriptive term for the feature.

== See also ==
- Anvil Stacks
