= Ong-ard Satrabhandhu =

Thai architect

- องอาจ สาตรพันธุ์
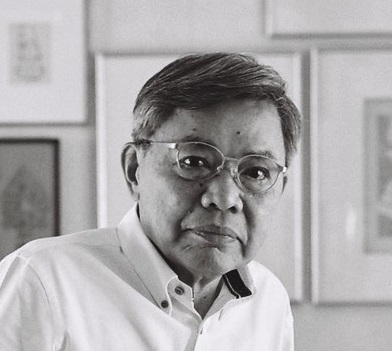
- Born: 8 February 1944 (age 82); Bangkok
- Education: Yale University; Cornell University
- Occupation: Architect
- Awards: Richard H. Driehaus Prize 2020; National Artist of Thailand 2009; The Baird Prize, Cornell 1962; The York Prize, Cornell 1960
- Website: Official website

Ong-ard Satrabhandhu (Thai: องอาจ สาตรพันธุ์) is an architect from Thailand. His style is known for linking the classical and traditional architecture languages of East and West. Currently, he is involved in the planning and architectural design of external envelope of “One Nimman” Urban development project in Chiang Mai, Thailand. Ong-ard Satrabhandhu was awarded the renowned Driehaus Architecture Prize in 2020.

== Career ==
Ong-ard received his B. Arch from Cornell University in 1965 and M. Arch from Yale University in 1967. At Cornell he studied under Colin Rowe.

One of his best known work is Rachamankha.

The book of his work, "A Tradition of Serenity: The Tropical Houses of Ong-ard Satrabhandhu" was published in 2015.

== Gallery ==
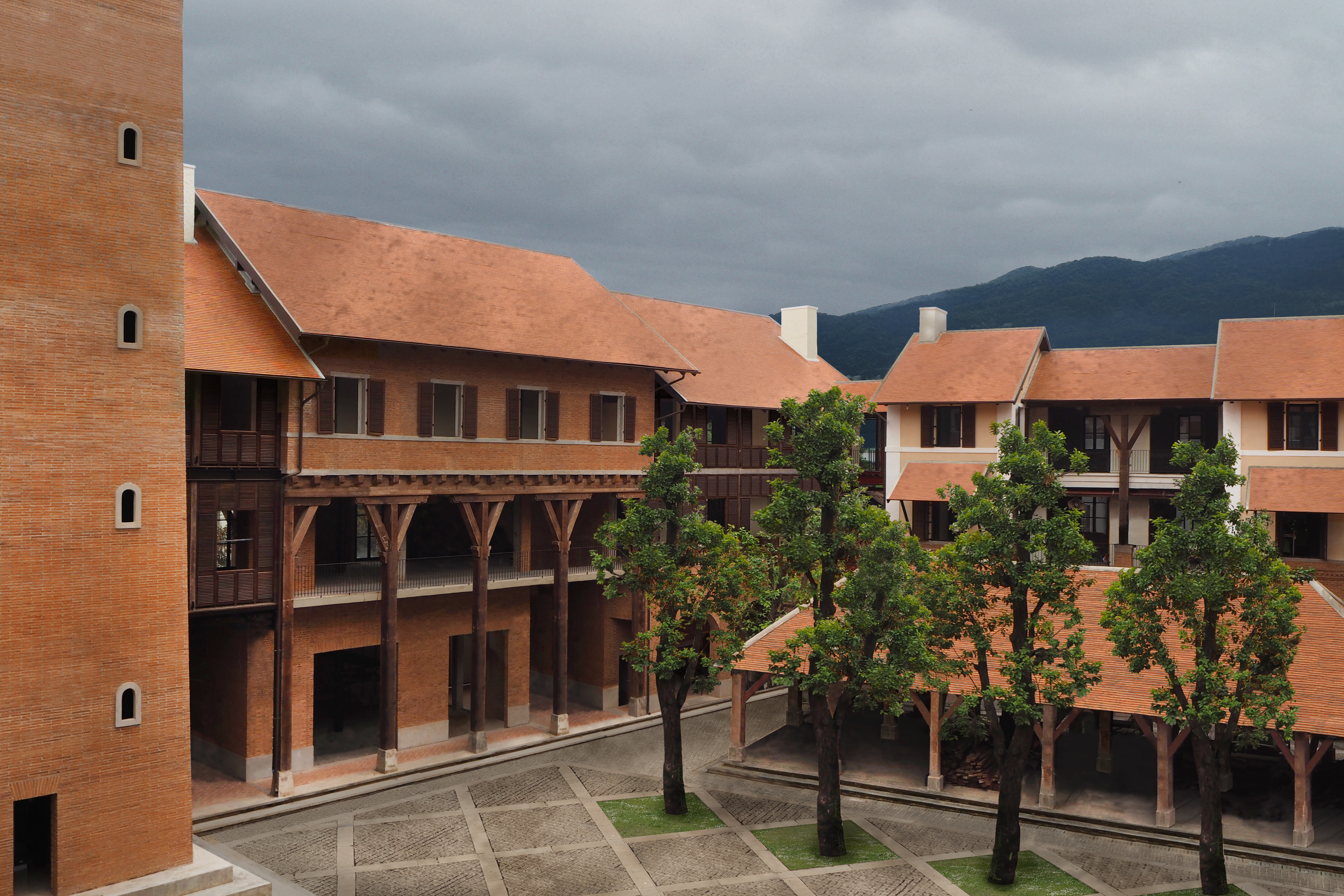
One Nimman, Chiang Mai, Thailand

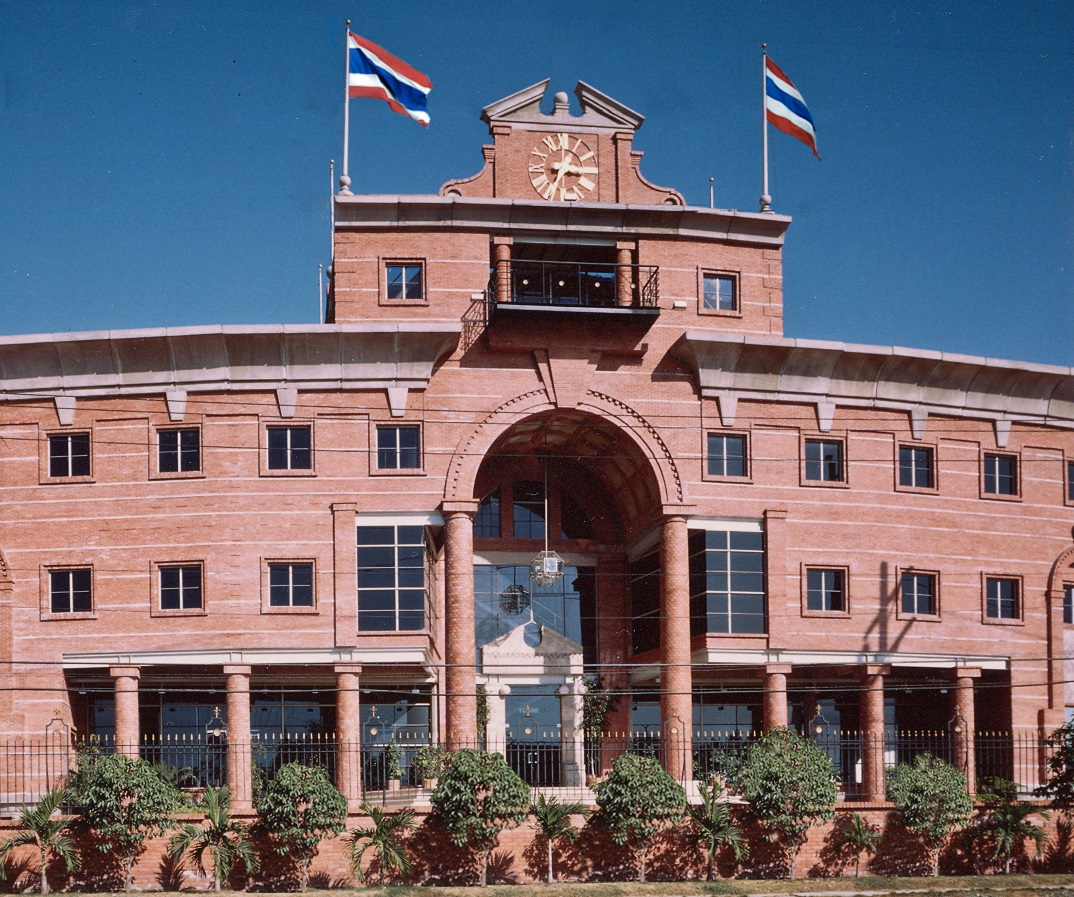
Toshiba Thailand Headquarters, Bangkok, Thailand

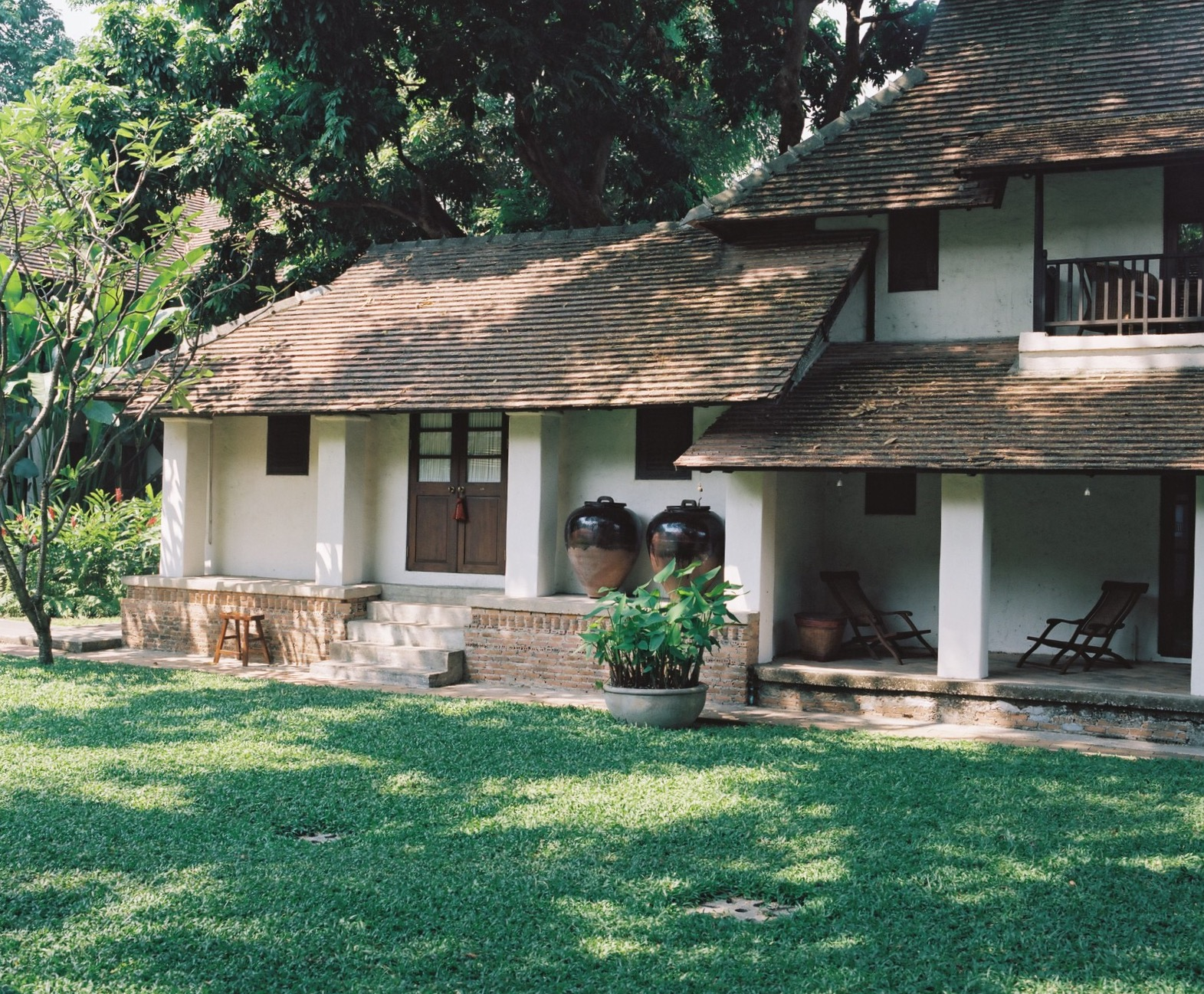
Tamarind Village

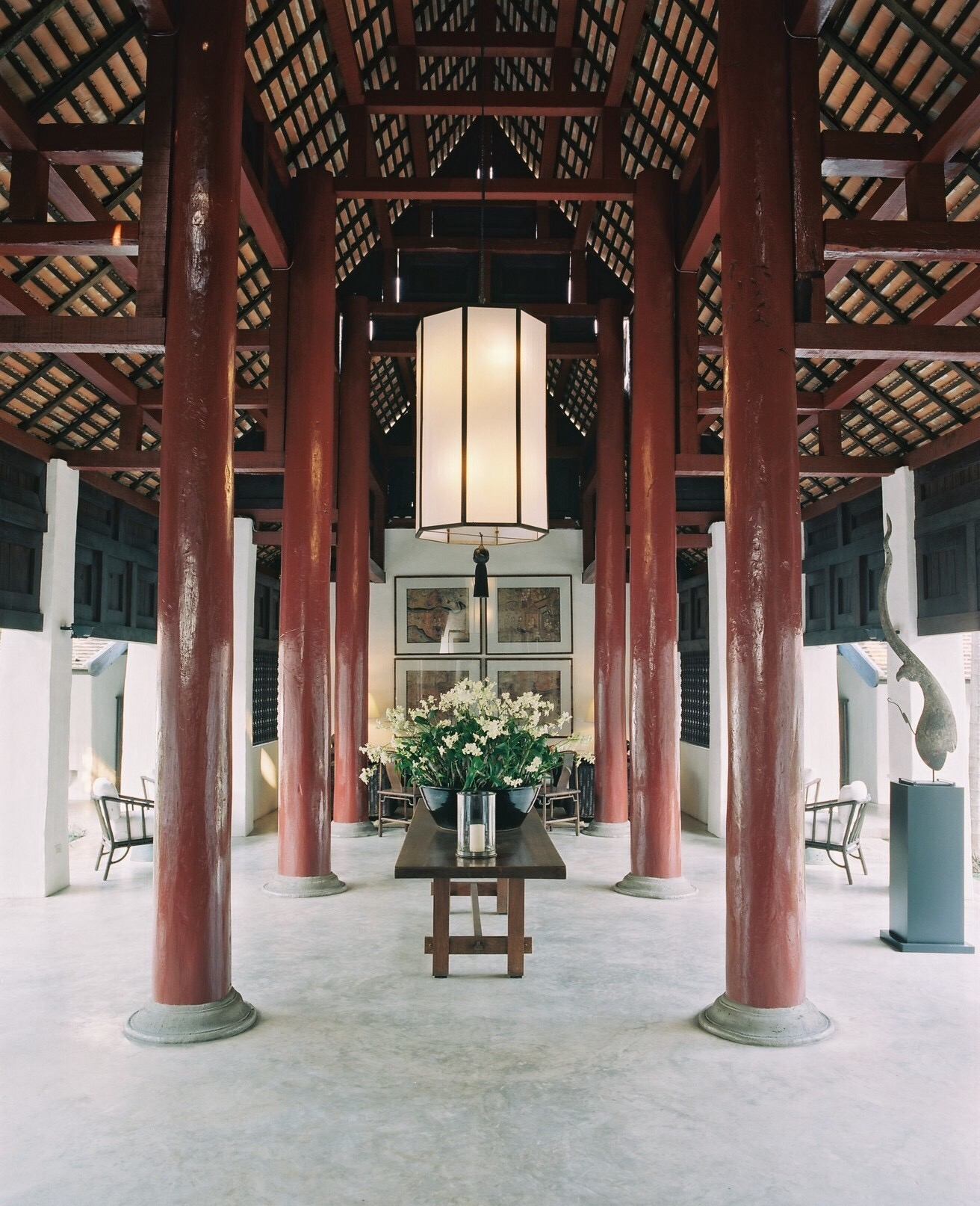
Rachamankha, Chiang Mai, Thailand

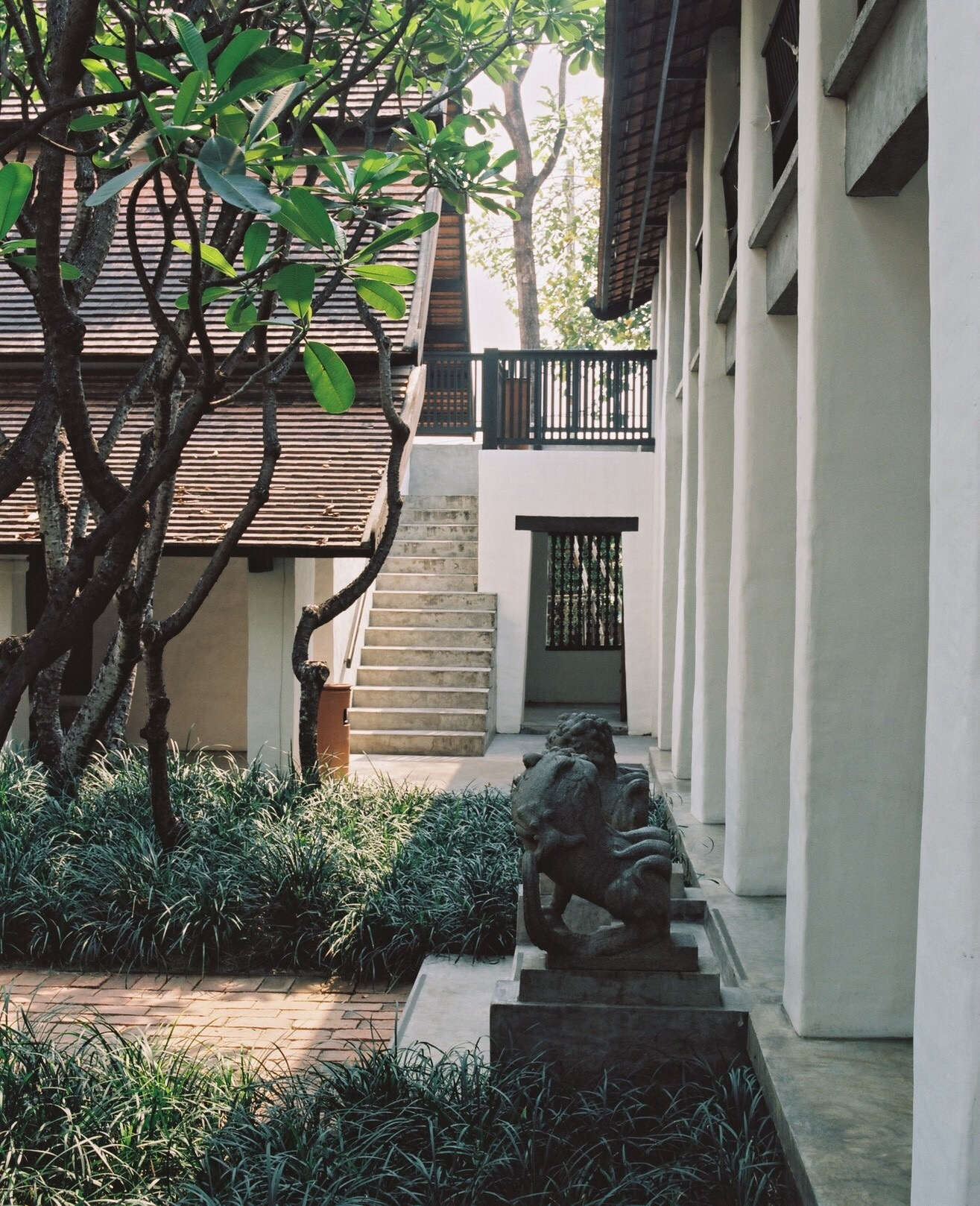
Rachamankha, Chiang Mai, Thailand

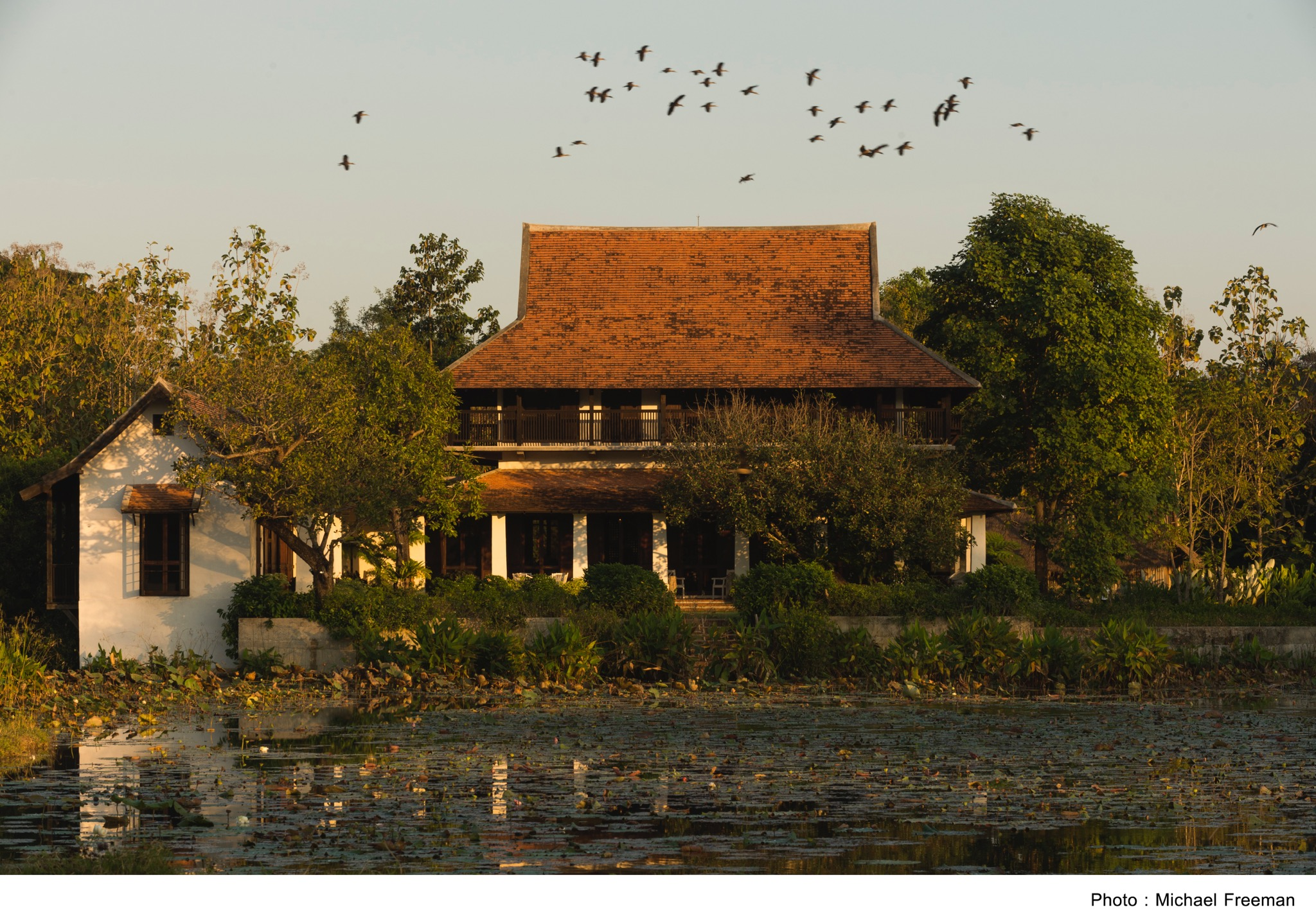
Mae Rim Residence
