= Turret Arch =

Arches National Park free standing arch

- Rock arch
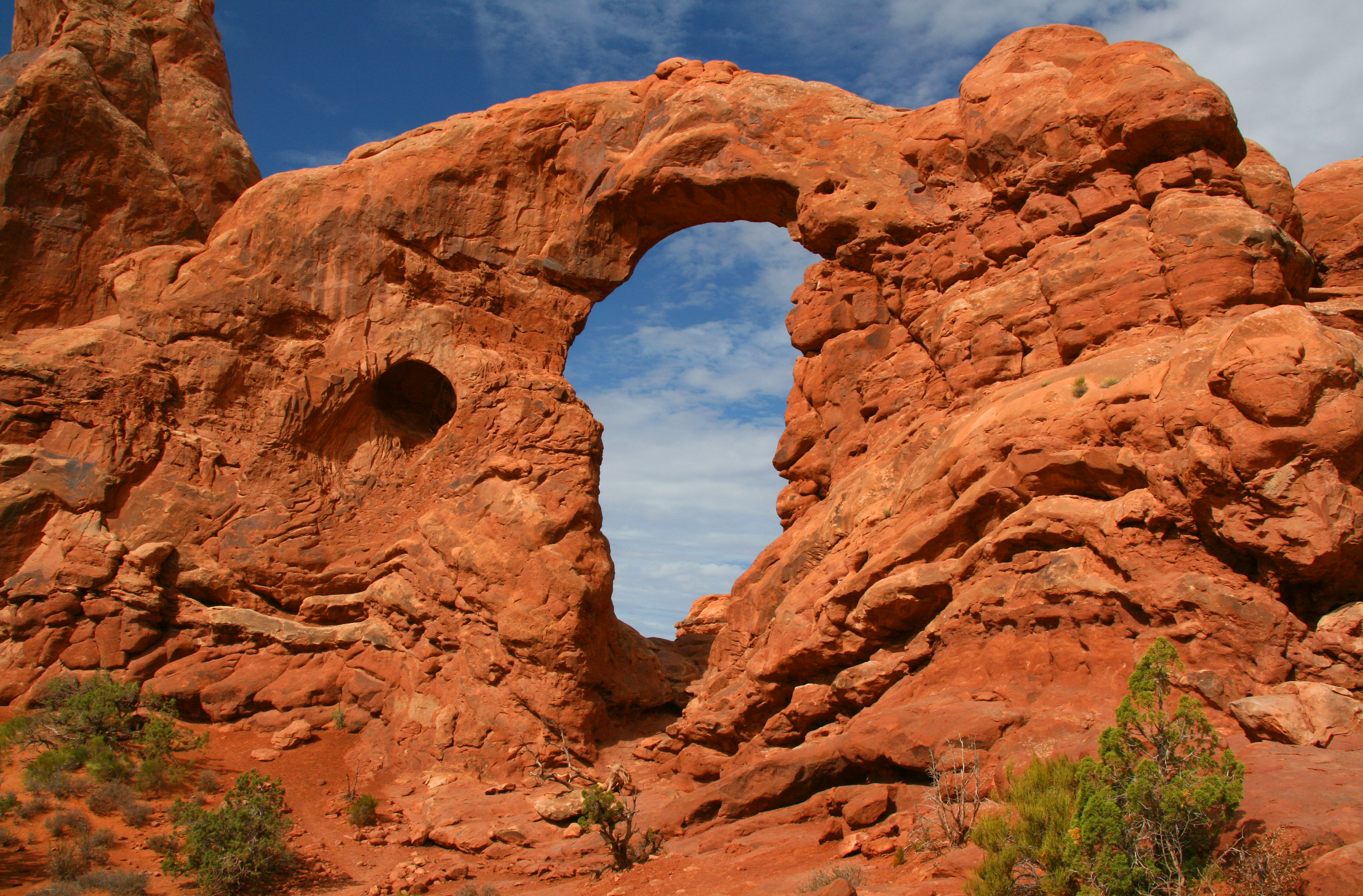
- View of Turret Arch

- Location within Utah
- Coordinates: 38°41′04″N 109°32′06″W
- Location: Arches National Park, Utah, United States

Dimensions
  - Width: 35 ft (11 m)
  - Height: 65 ft (20 m)
- Elevation: 5,325 ft (1,623 m)

Turret Arch is a natural free standing arch in the Windows area of Arches National Park, Utah, United States.

== Background ==
Turret Arch, along with Double Arch, form part of a series of arches in the Windows region of the park. The larger opening has a span of 35 feet and a height of 65 feet, and is the smallest of the three arches in the region. Turret Arch can be reached via The Windows trail, which is approximately a 1.2-mile loop with moderate terrain.

== Geology ==
The arch formed as the result of erosion through weak parts of sandstone fins composed of Jurassic-age Entrada Sandstone.

== Access ==
The arch can be accessed via a one mile trail through the North and South Window Arch and Turret Arch Loop. The trail also gives access to The North and South Window Arches.
