= Elephant Building =

Multi-tower high rise building

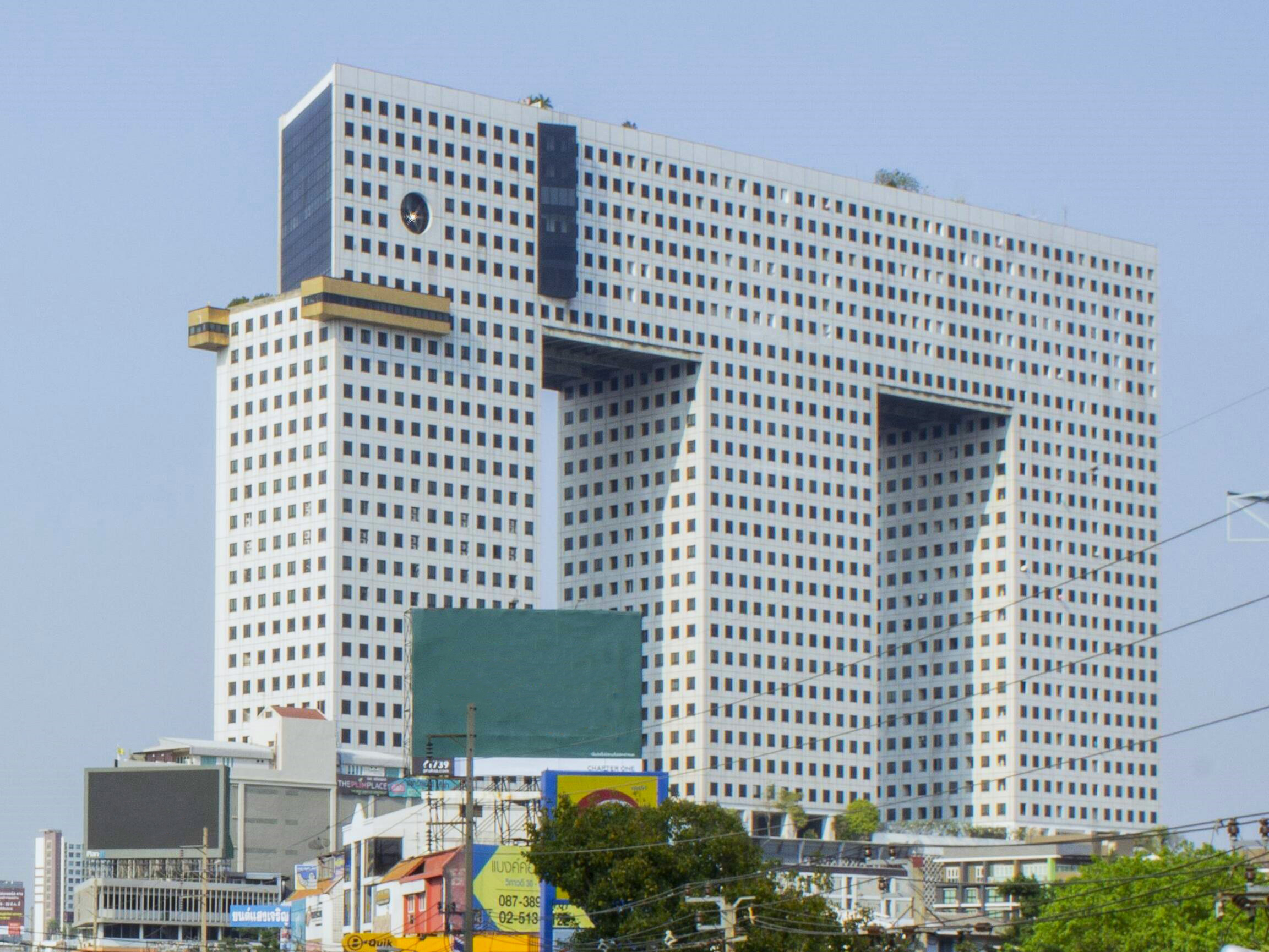

General information
- Status: Completed
- Completed: 1997
- Operator: Arun Chaiseri Group & Elephant Group

Design and construction
- Architect: Ong-at Sattraphan

The Elephant Building or Chang Building (Thai: ตึกช้าง, RTGS: tuek chang, Thai pronunciation: [tɯk̚˨˩.t͡ɕʰaːŋ˦˥]) is a skyscraper at Paholyothin Road and Ratchadaphisek Road in Bangkok, Thailand. It lies in the north Bangkok business district and Chatuchak District. Designed by architect Ong-ard Satrabhandhu and completed in 1997, the structure is shaped like an elephant, a national symbol of Thailand. It consists of three interconnected towers joined by a central section, with features including tusks, eyes and legs incorporated into its architectural design. It houses offices, shops, residential units and other commercial facilities.

== History ==
The elephant form is created by three towers (A, B and C) joined across the top by a horizontal band of residential suites. The elephant's ears are multistory balconies, while its tail runs down the rear of the building and is made up of about 20 stories of smoked-glass enclosed rooms. Inventive window arrangements suggest the eyes, ears and tusks. Developer Arun Chaisaree and architect Ong-ard Satrabhandhu reasoned that, with more than 80 completed skyscrapers in Bangkok, a tower needed something special to get noticed. Few subjects are more special in Thailand than elephants, so they conceived the building as an homage to the country's national animal.

The building is one of the better known buildings in Bangkok as it resembles an elephant. It was a collaboration between Dr Arun Chaisaree (Thai: ดร.อรุณ ชัยเสรี; RTGS: arun chai-seri) and architect Ong-ard Satrabhandhu (Thai: องอาจ สาตรพันธุ์; RTGS: Ong-at Sattraphan) The building has 32 floors and is 102 metres (335 ft) high. It was completed in 1997. The Elephant Building was ranked number four of the "20 World's Iconic Skyscrapers]" by CNNGo in February 2011.
