= HDMS Elefanten =

A number of ships of the Royal Danish Navy have carried the name Elefanten, or Elephanten. The modern translation of the English word "Elephant" in Danish-English dictionaries is "Elefant". The suffix -en is the definite article in Danish.

All the following are listed at The Royal Danish Naval Museum's Skibregister: most but not all have record cards on line at this register. The four ships-of-the-line launched between 1684 and 1773 are spelt Elephanten in the Royal Danish Naval Museum's List of Ships. Elephanten (1703) is recorded as Nye Elefant at the end of "E" on skibregister.

- Elephanten (1559)
- Elephanten (1618)
- Elephanten (1658)
- Den Hvide Elefant (1661) (The White Elephant)
- Elephanten (1678) ex Enhjørning (1676) – sixth rate; captured from the Swedish after the Battle of Öland; later Aurora (1689) and Frøken Elschen (1689)
- Elephanten (1684), ship of the line; later Gamle Elephant (1703)
- Elephanten (1687), frigate
- Elephanten af Danmark (1692), defenceship
- Elefantens Barkas (1711)
- Elephanten (1703), ship of the line, Also known as the New Elephant decommissioned 1728
- Elephanten (1741), ship of the line
- Elephanten (1773), ship of the line
- Elephanten (1802)
