= Elephant Gambit =

Position: a8 black rook, b8 black knight, c8 black bishop, d8 black queen, e8 black king, f8 black bishop, g8 black knight, h8 black rook, a7 black pawn, b7 black pawn, c7 black pawn, f7 black pawn, g7 black pawn, h7 black pawn, d5 black pawn, e5 black pawn, e4 white pawn, f3 white knight, a2 white pawn, b2 white pawn, c2 white pawn, d2 white pawn, f2 white pawn, g2 white pawn, h2 white pawn, a1 white rook, b1 white knight, c1 white bishop, d1 white queen, e1 white king, f1 white bishop, h1 white rook
- Moves: 1.e4 e5 2.Nf3 d5
- ECO: C40
- Parent: King's Knight Opening
- Synonyms: Queen's Pawn Countergambit; Englund Counterattack; Turkish Gambit

The Elephant Gambit (also called the Queen's Pawn Countergambit) is a chess opening beginning with the moves:

1. e4 e5
2. Nf3 d5

White is able to capture either of Black's pawns, either by 3.exd5 or 3.Nxe5, with advantage. Though it sets some traps, Black can end up in a passive position with White having the initiative and more space, so it is considered unsound.

== 3.exd5 ==
Black's responses to 3.exd5 include 3...e4 and 3...Bd6. 3...Qxd5 saves the pawn, but leaves White with a big lead in development after 4.Nc3.

=== 3...e4 ===
After 3...e4 4.Qe2 Nf6 lines might continue:

- 5.d3 Qxd5 6.Nbd2 Be7 7.dxe4 Qe6 and White remains a pawn ahead, although Black's development is somewhat smoother.
- 5.d3 Be7 6.dxe4 0-0 7.Nc3 Re8 8.Bd2 Bb4 9.0-0-0, with advantage for White (Nick de Firmian).
- 5.Nc3 Be7 6.Nxe4:
  - 6...Nxd5 7.d3 0-0 8.Qd1 Bg4 9.Be2 f5 10.Ng3 Nc6 11.c3 with slight advantage for White, as in Salomonsson–H. Sorenson, Malmo 1982 (de Firmian).
  - 6...0-0 7.Nxf6+ Bxf6 8.d4 Re8 9.Be3 with distinct superiority for White (de Firmian).

After 3...e4 4.Qe2, Tal–Lutikov, Tallinn 1964 continued 4...f5 5.d3 Nf6 6.dxe4 fxe4 7.Nc3 Bb4 8.Qb5+ c6 9.Qxb4 exf3 10.Bg5 cxd5 11.0-0-0 Nc6 with advantage for White.

=== 3...Bd6 ===
Position: a8 black rook, b8 black knight, c8 black bishop, d8 black queen, e8 black king, g8 black knight, h8 black rook, a7 black pawn, b7 black pawn, c7 black pawn, f7 black pawn, g7 black pawn, h7 black pawn, d6 black bishop, d5 white pawn, e5 black pawn, f3 white knight, a2 white pawn, b2 white pawn, c2 white pawn, d2 white pawn, f2 white pawn, g2 white pawn, h2 white pawn, a1 white rook, b1 white knight, c1 white bishop, d1 white queen, e1 white king, f1 white bishop, h1 white rook

Elephant Gambit proper: 3.exd5 Bd6

After 3...Bd6 4.d4 e4 5.Ne5 Nf6 6.Nc3 0-0 7.Bc4, according to de Firmian, White enjoys a distinct superiority but no immediate attack.

== 3.Nxe5 ==
After 3.Nxe5:

- Black plays 3...Bd6 4.d4 dxe4 5.Bc4 Bxe5 6.Qh5 Qf6 7.dxe5, which is thought to be slightly better for White.
- In Lob–Eliskases, German CC 1929, Black played 3...dxe4. The game continued 4.Bc4 Qg5 5.Bxf7+ Ke7 6.d4 Qxg2 7.Rf1 Bh3 8.Bc4 Nf6 9.Bf4 and White went on to win.
- 3...Qe7? leads to an advantage for White after 4.d4 f6 5.Nd3 dxe4 6.Nf4 Qf7 7.Nd2 (Bondarevsky–Lilienthal, USSR 1941).

== See also ==
- List of chess openings
