= Seeteufel =

Prototype German amphibious midget submarine

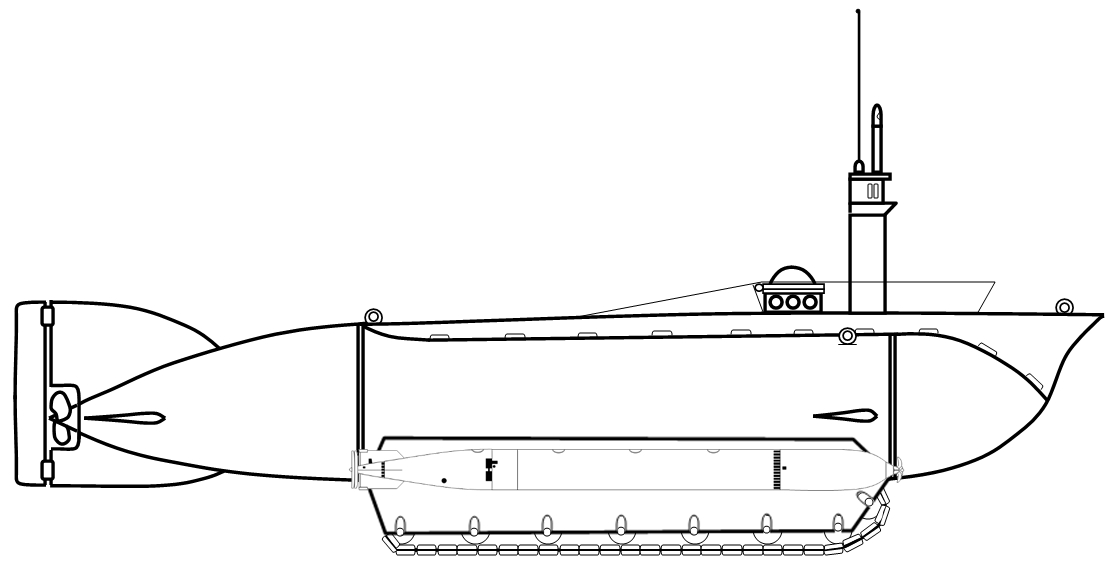
- Profile drawing of a Seeteufel

History

Nazi Germany
- Name: Seeteufel
- Namesake: Sea Devil
- Fate: Demolished, May 1945

General characteristics
- Type: Midget submarine
- Displacement: 35 t (34 long tons) (submerged)
- Length: 14.2 m (47 ft)
- Beam: 2 m (6 ft 7 in)
- Installed power: 80 bhp (60 kW) gasoline engine (surfaced); 25 bhp (19 kW) electric motor (submerged)
- Propulsion: 1 × propeller; 2 × caterpillar tracks
- Speed: 10 knots (19 km/h; 12 mph) (surfaced); 8 knots (15 km/h; 9.2 mph) (submerged)
- Test depth: 21 m (69 ft)
- Complement: 2
- Armament: 2 external G7e torpedoes or 4 mines

Seeteufel (Sea Devil, also known as the Elefant (Elephant)) was a two-man amphibious midget submarine, developed by Nazi Germany during World War II. Only one prototype was built in 1944, although its testing was relatively successful and negotiations began for another series of three to test the necessary changes before beginning series production in 1945. These plans were cancelled at the beginning of that year when the decision was made to concentrate production on designs already being built.

== Background and description ==
The Neger and Marder human torpedoes and the Biber midget submarines were difficult to launch from anywhere other than a harbor. The special preparations required to do so limited their operational flexibility and required additional time and resources. Alois Lödige and several of his colleagues of the Kiel-Eckernförde torpedo testing center developed the concept of putting tracks on a midget submarine to allow it to move on and off a beach under its own power. They designed and built a proof-of-concept vehicle in early 1944 that was tested in March. The one-man Sonderfahrzeug (special vessel) was 9.825 meters (32 ft 2.8 in) long and displaced 16 metric tons (16 long tons) without armament. It mounted a pair of torpedoes low on the hull by the tracks.

The prototype Seeteufel was developed in four months and was ready for testing in July. A two-man crew controlled the 14.2-meter-long (46 ft 7 in) submarine. It had a beam of 2 meters (6 ft 7 in) and displaced 35 metric tons (34 long tons). The submarine was equipped with an 80-brake-horsepower (60 kW) gasoline-fueled Otto engine provided propulsion on both water (at 10 knots (19 km/h; 12 mph) on the surface using a single propeller) and land (at 10 kilometers per hour (6.2 mph)). When submerged, the same 25-brake-horsepower (19 kW) electric motor as used in the Seehund (Seal) midget submarine, gave the vessel a cruising speed of 8 knots (15 km/h; 9.2 mph). The prototype demonstrated a diving depth of 21 meters (69 ft)

The Seeteufel's engine was in the bow, directly underneath the fixed snorkel mast that also contained the periscope, a radio antenna and the magnetic compass. The control room was aft of this with a low-profile conning tower fitted with the entry hatch. The batteries and the fuel tank were in the middle with the AEG electric motor in the stern. The forward diving planes were fixed, but the rudder and aft diving planes were governed by the driver with his aircraft-like control stick. The boat was equipped with a special ballast tank that compensated for the weight of its armament of a pair of standard G7e torpedoes and prevented it from breaking the surface when the torpedoes were fired. It could carry four naval mines in lieu of the torpedoes. On land it could be equipped with flamethrowers or machine guns.

Testing showed that the submarine performed well underwater, but it was considered underpowered on land and the tracks were too narrow. More powerful 250 bhp (190 kW) diesel engines were planned for later models, in addition to wider tracks to spread the load and decrease ground pressure. The prototype was demonstrated to the management of the Borgward factory in Bremen and negotiations began for the production of three preproduction vessels to test the planned changes. The decision by the Oberkommando der Marine (Naval High Command) to focus production on models already being manufactured at the beginning of 1945 caused these plans to be canceled. The prototype was transferred to Lübeck and destroyed at the end of the war.

== Assessment ==
Vizeadmiral (Vice Admiral) Hellmuth Heye, commander of the German Naval Special Forces (German: Kleinkampfverbände, lit. 'Small Combat Units'), stated in 1944:

"I consider the Sea Devil a promising weapon for use in commando raids. It is independent of mother craft and base personnel, can land on foreign shores, commit acts of sabotage, and evade pursuit ashore or afloat. It can be taken to site by a mother ship equipped with a large crane. With an engine of higher output than that of the experimental boat, a speed of 8 to 10 knots can be obtained. Speed and radius of action could be further increased by installation of a closed-cycle engine. Intended for use in coastal waters if weather is not too rough, and on rivers, lakes and artificial lakes..."

== Bibliography ==
- Kemp, Paul (1996). Underwater Warriors. London: Arms & Armour Press. ISBN 1-85409-228-6.
- Mallmann Showell, Jak P. (2002). The German Navy Handbook, 1939–1945. Stroud, UK: Sutton Publishing. ISBN 0-7509-3205-8.
- Moore, John & Compton-Hall, Richard (1987). Submarine Warfare: Today and Tomorrow. Bethesda, Maryland: Adler & Adler. ISBN 0-91756-121-X.
- Prenatt, Jamie & Stille, Mark (2014). Axis Midget Submarines: 1939–45. Oxford, UK: Osprey Publishing. ISBN 978-1-4728-0122-7.
- Rossler, Eberhard (2001). The U-Boat: The Evolution and Technical History of German Submarines. London: Cassell. ISBN 0-304-36120-8.
