= African Elephant (sculpture) =

Sculpture in Houston, Texas, U.S.

- Artist: Robert (Bob) Knight Fowler, Jr.
- Year: 1982
- Medium: Cor-ten steel
- Subject: African elephant
- Dimensions: 3.7 m × 3.0 m × 8.5 m (12 ft × 10 ft × 28 ft)
- Weight: 5 ton
- Location: Houston Zoo, Houston, Texas, United States; 29.7122°N 95.3930°W
- Owner: City of Houston

African Elephant is a life-size Cor-ten steel sculpture by Robert (Bob) Fowler (1931–2010), located at the Houston Zoo's secondary entrance on Cambridge Street, across from the Ben Taub Hospital parking garage. The African elephant appears to be in motion, with its trunk outstretched and one foot raised, and the elephant's powerful musculature is evident with the welded rods used to define its body.

The sculpture was a gift from Isabel and Max Herzstein, and it was dedicated at the main entrance of the zoo in 1982. In 1999, artist Ben Woitena refurbished the piece and the next year the zoo opened its west entrance and the sculpture was moved there.

Fowler's Spoonbills (1966/1967) is at the entrance to the Birdhouse at the Houston Zoo. His Gorilla (1973) was at the Gorilla House but is now in storage.

== See also ==
- Cultural depictions of elephants
