= Elephant (1993 film) =

1993 film about seatbelt use

- Release date: 1993
- Country: United Kingdom

Elephant is the title of a British public information film about the importance of wearing a seatbelt in the rear of a car. It was first broadcast in 1993 and continued until 1998, when it was replaced by the Julie campaign.

The film, shot entirely in black and white (save for a streak of red in the closing shot), shows four friends driving along an ordinary street. The driver and the passenger sitting behind him are not wearing their seatbelts. When the car crashes into another vehicle ahead, computer imagery shows the unrestrained back seat passenger morphing into an elephant to demonstrate that in a collision at 30 miles per hour, a passenger not wearing a seatbelt can be thrown forward at the force of 3 and a half tons, equivalent to an elephant charging directly at the person in front. The weight of the "elephant" forces the driver into the steering wheel as the rear passenger smashes through the windscreen, and the front seat passenger gapes in horror as the camera closes in on the driver's body and the wreckage of the car.

This was the last public information film about seatbelts to use the Clunk Click Every Trip slogan, here abbreviated to an onomatopoeic "Clunk Click" appearing in time with the soundtrack.
