= Elephant Ridge =

Elephant Ridge (71°20′S 68°19′W) is a sharp curved ridge in Antarctica, orientated generally west–east, and extending for about 0.5 nautical miles (1 km), with the highest point at the center rising to 6,999 metres (22,963 ft). The northern slopes are snow and ice free, and the central point is situated about 0.7 nautical miles (1.3 km) south-southeast of Khufu Peak and 0.9 nautical miles (1.7 km) southwest of Giza Peak. Uranus Glacier forms the southern boundary of the feature. Elephant Ridge is referred to as "Man Pack Hill" in scientific reports in the early 1960s, and is locally known descriptively as "The Elephant." The summit resembles an elephant's head, with the ridge forming the trunk.
