= Kostov Island =

One of the South Orkney Islands in the Southern Ocean

- Map of the South Orkney Islands

- Location within Antarctica

Geography
- Location: Antarctica
- Coordinates: 60°42′47″S 45°09′12″W
- Archipelago: South Orkney Islands
- Area: 4 ha (9.9 acres)
- Length: 380 m (1250 ft)
- Width: 210 m (690 ft)

Administration
- Administered under the Antarctic Treaty System

Demographics
- Population: uninhabited

Kostov Island (Bulgarian: Костов остров, romanized: Kostov ostrov, IPA: [ˈkɔstof ˈɔstrof]) is the 380 m long in south-north direction and 210 m wide rocky island with surface area of 4 hectares (9.9 acres) lying in Lewthwaite Strait off the east coast of Coronation Island in the South Orkney Islands, Antarctica. It is "named after Captain Kosyo Kostov, commander of the ocean fishing trawler Afala of the Bulgarian company Ocean Fisheries – Burgas during its fishing trips to Antarctic waters off South Georgia from March to August 1985 and in the 1985/86 season. The Bulgarian fishermen, along with those of the Soviet Union, Poland and East Germany are the pioneers of modern Antarctic fishing industry."

== Location ==
Kostov Island is located at 60°42′47″S 45°09′12″W, which is 1.75 km north-northeast of the southeast extremity of Coronation Island, 2.48 km south of the northeast entrance point of Spence Harbour, and 4.3 km west-southwest of Cape Disappointment on Powell Island. British mapping in 1963.

== Maps ==
- British Antarctic Territory: South Orkney Islands. Scale 1:100000 topographic map. DOS Series 510. Surrey, England: Directorate of Overseas Surveys, 1963
- Antarctic Digital Database (ADD). Scale 1:250000 topographic map of Antarctica. Scientific Committee on Antarctic Research (SCAR). Since 1993, regularly upgraded and updated
