= Southern Powell Island and adjacent islets Specially Protected Area =

Protected Area of Antarctica

Coordinates: 60°42′S 45°01′W

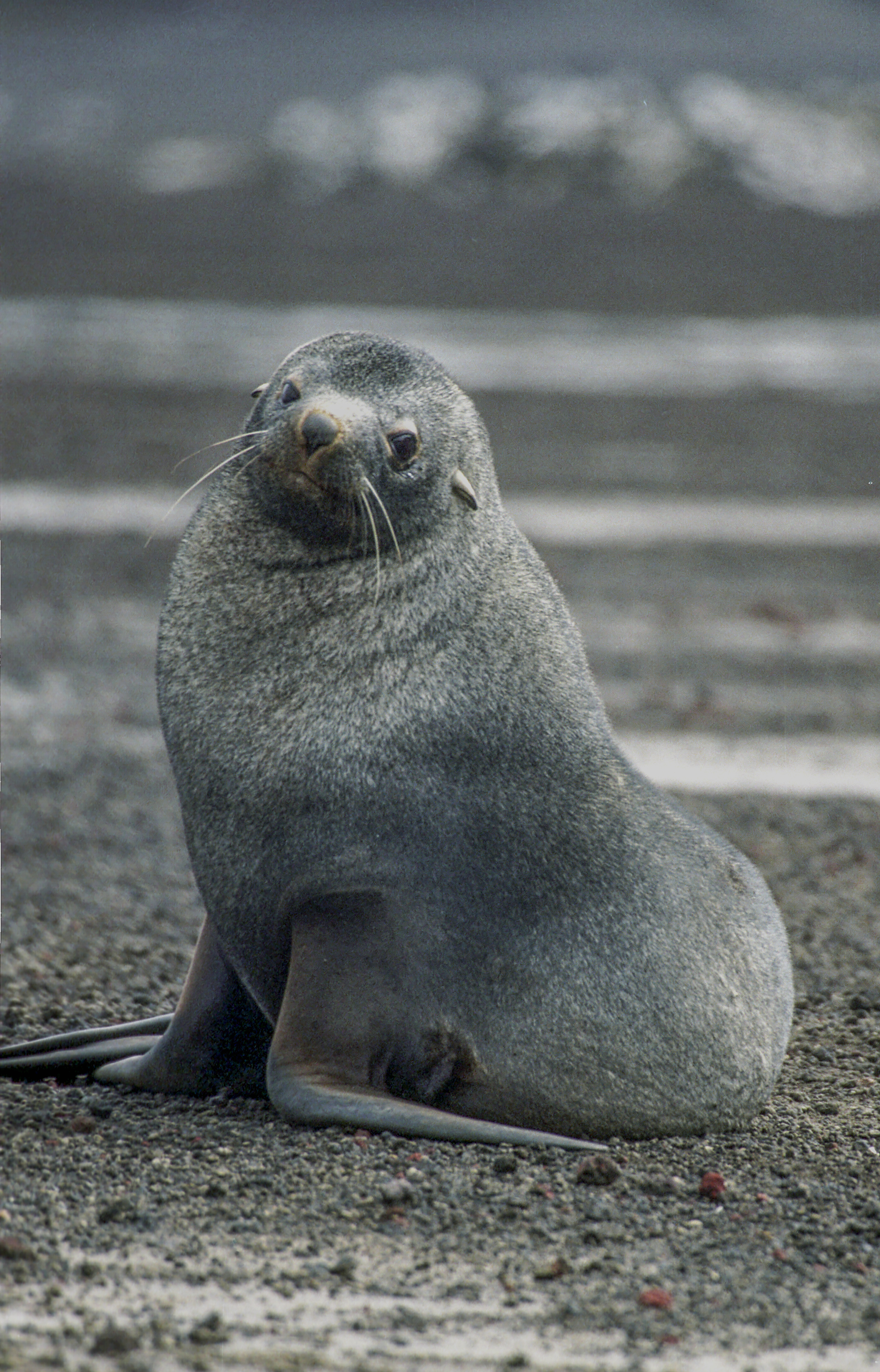
Antarctic fur seals breed at the site

The Southern Powell Island and adjacent islets Specially Protected Area is a 2688 ha site encompassing part of southern Powell Island in the South Orkney Islands of Antarctica. It includes neighbouring Christoffersen, Fredriksen, Michelsen and Grey Islands, along with some other (unnamed) offshore islets. It was designated an Antarctic Specially Protected Area (ASPA 111, formerly SPA 15) because of its biological values as it supports many plants and animals that exemplify the natural ecology of the South Orkney Islands. It is also a breeding site for Antarctic fur seals.

== Important Bird Area ==
The site has been identified as an Important Bird Area (IBA) by BirdLife International because it supports several significant seabird breeding colonies. Birds nesting there include gentoo penguins (8000 pairs), Adélie penguins (16,750 pairs), chinstrap penguins (28,100 pairs) and small numbers of macaroni penguins, as well as southern giant petrels (600 pairs), snow petrels, Cape petrels, imperial shags, kelp gulls, brown skuas and snowy sheathbills.
