= Whale Skerries =

Coordinates: 60°42′S 45°6′W

Whale Skerries is a small group of islands and rocks in Lewthwaite Strait in the South Orkney Islands, lying close west of Cape Disappointment, Powell Island. First charted and named "Hvalskjaer" by Petter Sorlle in 1912–13. The name was later corrected to the plural form, "Hvalskjaerene" (Whale Skerries), by Sorlle. The English form of the name was recommended by the United Kingdom Antarctic Place-Names Committee (UK-APC) in 1954.
