= Angelov Island =

One of the South Orkney Islands in the Southern Ocean

- Map of the South Orkney Islands

- Location within Antarctica

Geography
- Location: Antarctica
- Coordinates: 60°35′35″S 46°05′22″W
- Archipelago: South Orkney Islands
- Area: 17 ha (42 acres)
- Length: 700 m (2300 ft)
- Width: 530 m (1740 ft)

Administration
- Administered under the Antarctic Treaty System

Demographics
- Population: Uninhabited

Angelov Island (Bulgarian: Ангелов остров, romanized: Angelov ostrov, IPA: [ˈaŋɡɛɫof ˈɔstrof]) is a rocky island in the Larsen Islands group on the west side of Coronation Island in the South Orkney Islands, Antarctica. It is 700 m long, in the south-north direction, and 530 m wide, with an area of 17 hectares (42 acres). It is named after Captain Kosyo Angelov (1948-2005), commander of the ocean fishing trawler Argonavt of the Bulgarian company Ocean Fisheries – Burgas during its fishing trip to Antarctic waters off South Georgia and the South Orkney Islands from December 1978 to July 1979. Apart from trawling, the ship carried an onboard scientific team which undertook fisheries research. The Bulgarian fishermen, along with those of the Soviet Union, Poland and East Germany, are pioneers of modern Antarctic fishing industry.

== Location ==
Angelov Island is located at 60°35′35″S 46°05′22″W, which is 3.53 km northwest of Moreton Point, 700 m northwest of Monroe Island, 200 m northwest of Haralambiev Island and 150 m southeast of Nicolas Rocks. British mapping in 1963.

== Maps ==
- British Antarctic Territory: South Orkney Islands. Scale 1:100000 topographic map. DOS Series 510. Surrey, England: Directorate of Overseas Surveys, 1963
- Antarctic Digital Database (ADD). Scale 1:250000 topographic map of Antarctica. Scientific Committee on Antarctic Research (SCAR). Since 1993, regularly upgraded and updated
