= Haralambiev Island =

One of the South Orkney Islands in the Southern Ocean

- Map of the South Orkney Islands

- Location within Antarctica

Geography
- Location: Antarctica
- Coordinates: 60°35′44″S 46°04′38″W
- Archipelago: South Orkney Islands
- Area: 13 ha (32 acres)
- Length: 530 m (1740 ft)
- Width: 300 m (1000 ft)

Administration
- Administered under the Antarctic Treaty System

Demographics
- Population: uninhabited

Haralambiev Island (Bulgarian: Хараламбиев остров, romanized: Haralambiev ostrov, IPA: [xɐrɐˈɫambiɛf ˈɔstrof]) is the 530 m long in southeast-northwest direction and 300 m wide rocky island with surface area of 13 hectares (32 acres) in the Larsen Islands group on the west side of Coronation Island in the South Orkney Islands, Antarctica. It is "named after Captain Hristo Haralambiev (1948–2005), commander of the ocean fishing trawler Aktinia of the Bulgarian company Ocean Fisheries – Burgas during its fishing trip to Antarctic waters off South Georgia and the South Orkney Islands from November 1979 to June 1980. The Bulgarian fishermen, along with those of the Soviet Union, Poland and East Germany are the pioneers of modern Antarctic fishing industry."

== Location ==
Haralambiev Island is located at 60°35′44″S 46°04′38″W, which is 2.8 km northwest of Moreton Point, 160 m northwest of Monroe Island and 200 m southeast of Angelov Island. British mapping in 1963.

== Maps ==
- British Antarctic Territory: South Orkney Islands. Scale 1:100000 topographic map. DOS Series 510. Surrey, England: Directorate of Overseas Surveys, 1963
- Antarctic Digital Database (ADD). Scale 1:250000 topographic map of Antarctica. Scientific Committee on Antarctic Research (SCAR). Since 1993, regularly upgraded and updated
