= Mount Noble =

Mountain in the South Orkney Islands

Mount Noble (60°39′S 45°16′W) is a mountain, 1,165 m, standing at the north side of Roald Glacier 2 nautical miles (3.7 km) west of Gibbon Bay, in the east portion of Coronation Island in the South Orkney Islands. Presumably first sighted by Captain Nathaniel Palmer and Captain George Powell in 1821. The peak was named by James Weddell in 1823 for his friend James Noble (senator) of Edinburgh, orientalist.
