= Cruchley =

Cruchley may refer to:

- George Frederick Cruchley (1797-1880), English map-maker, engraver and publisher
- Murray Cruchley, Canadian actor and radio personality.
- Cruchley Ice Piedmont, ice piedmont in the South Orkney Islands.
