= Washington Strait =

Strait in the South Orkney Islands, Antarctica

Washington Strait (60°43′S 44°56′W) is a passage 3 miles (4.8 km) wide between Fredriksen and Powell Islands on the west and Laurie Island and several smaller islands on the east, in the South Orkney Islands. Discovered in December 1821 on the occasion of the joint cruise by Captain George Powell, a British sealer in the sloop Dove, and Captain Nathaniel Palmer, an American sealer in the sloop James Monroe. Supposedly, it was named for George Washington, first President of the United States.
