= Nicolas Rocks =

Nicolas Rocks (60°34′S 46°6′W) is a group of rocks at the northwest side of the Larsen Islands, lying 2.5 nautical miles (4.6 km) off the west end of Coronation Island in the South Orkney Islands. Discovered by Captain George Powell and Captain Nathaniel Palmer in December 1821. Named "Cape Nicolas" by Powell after the feast day of Saint Nicholas, December 6, the approximate day of discovery. Powell's spelling "Nicolas" has been retained because of long usage, but the term rocks is considered more descriptive of the feature.
