= Powell Basin =

Sea basins in Antarctica

Powell Basin (62°15′S 49°30′W) is an undersea basin between the southern tip of Argentina and Antarctica named for George Powell, captain of an English sealing ship, who discovered Powell Island. Name approved 11/77 (ACUF 177).
