= Roald Glacier =

Glacier in Antarctica

- Location within South Orkney Islands
- Location: South Orkney Islands
- Coordinates: 60°39′S 45°13′W
- Thickness: unknown
- Terminus: Gibbon Bay
- Status: unknown

Roald Glacier (60°39′S 45°13′W) is a glacier which flows from the vicinity of Mount Noble and Mount Sladen eastward into Gibbon Bay, on the east coast of Coronation Island in the South Orkney Islands. Chartered and named by the Norwegian whaling captain Petter Sorle in the period 1912–15. Surveyed in 1948-49 by the Falkland Islands Dependencies Survey (FIDS).

== See also ==
- List of glaciers in the Antarctic
- Glaciology
