= Ellefsen Harbour =

Harbour in South Orkney Islands, discovered in 1821

Ellefsen Harbour (60°44′S 45°3′W) is a harbour lying at the south end of Powell Island between Christoffersen Island and Michelsen Island, in the South Orkney Islands. It was discovered in the course of a joint cruise by Captain George Powell, a British sealer, and Captain Nathaniel Palmer, an American sealer, in December 1821. Shortly afterward, it was briefly occupied by Sam Pointer. The name first appeared on Powell's chart published in 1822.
