= Cape Barlas =

Cape in the South Orkney Islands, Antarctica

Cape Barlas (60°43′S 45°0′W) is a cape marking the north end of Fredriksen Island in the South Orkney Islands. Discovered and roughly charted in the course of the joint cruise by Captain Nathaniel Palmer and Captain George Powell in 1821. Further charted by DI in 1933 and named after William Barlas (1888–1941), British representative at Deception Island and South Shetland Islands for the season 1914–1915, and at South Georgia on various occasions, 1928–1941.
