= Cruchley Ice Piedmont =

Cruchley Ice Piedmont (60°41′S 45°1′W) is an ice piedmont between the east margins of Powell Island and its north–south range of hills, extending 2.5 nautical miles (5 km) northward from the John Peaks, in the South Orkney Islands. It is a new name applied by the UK Antarctic Place-Names Committee in 1987 that historically derives from James Weddell's map of 1825 on which Powell Island is charted as two islands, the southern one being "Cruchley's Island."
