= Sphinx Rock =

Sphinx Rock may refer to

- Sphinx Rock (South Orkney Islands)
- Sphinx Rock (Victoria Land)
