= Spence Harbor =

Spence Harbor (60°41′S 45°9′W) is a small bay 1 nautical mile (1.9 km) south of The Turret, along the east coast of Coronation Island, in the South Orkney Islands. Discovered in December 1821 by Captain George Powell, a British sealer in the sloop Dove, who named the bay, and Captain Nathaniel Palmer, an American sealer in the sloop James Monroe.
