= Cape Disappointment (South Orkney Islands) =

Landform of Powell Island

Cape Disappointment (60°42′S 45°5′W) is a cape midway along the west side of Powell Island, in the South Orkney Islands. The name was originally applied to the southern end of Powell Island by Captain George Powell and Captain Nathaniel Palmer in 1821, reflecting their reluctance to terminate their eastward cruise, necessitated by exhausted provisions and unfavorable winds. In recent years the name has been consistently used for the cape on the west side of the island.
