= Discovery III =

- The sternwheeler Discovery III on the Chena River near Fairbanks, Alaska.

History

United States
- Builder: Nichols Brothers shipyard, Whidbey Island, Washington
- Laid down: 1986
- Launched: May 31, 1987
- Christened: May 9, 1987
- In service: July 4, 1987
- Homeport: Fairbanks, Alaska
- Nickname(s): "D3"
- Status: Active in service

General characteristics
- Displacement: 280 tons
- Length: 156 ft (48 m)
- Beam: 34 ft (10 m)
- Draft: 3 ft (0.91 m)
- Propulsion: (2) 540 hp 12V71 diesel engines by Emerson Diesel powering a hydraulic propulsion system which turns a 20 ft-diameter (6.1 m) paddlewheel.
- Capacity: 900
- Complement: 5-9 (Captain, First Mate, Lead Deckhand, 2-6 Deckhands)

Discovery III, built in 1987, is the third of three Discovery sternwheel riverboats operated by the Riverboat Discovery company. Discovery III is still in use as a tour vessel on the Chena and Tanana rivers near Fairbanks, Alaska.

== History ==
Discovery III came into being in 1987 as a result of increased tour traffic to the Riverboat Discovery. Due to increased passenger numbers, the company frequently had to turn away potential guests due to the limited capacity of Discovery II, their primary tour boat. As a result, in 1986 Captain Jim Binkley and his three sons began planning for the construction of a third sternwheeler for the company, which would be named Discovery III.

Plans for Discovery III were finalized by the fall of 1986, and the Binkley family hired the Nichols Brothers Boat Builders, Inc. to build the superstructure of the boat's hulls and decks. Construction began in the late fall of 1986 at the Nichols Brothers shipyard in Whidbey Island, Washington.

Construction of Discovery III was completed 8 months later, in early May 1987. The boat was christened May 9, 1987, in Langley, Washington, and afterward was taken by barge north to the mouth of the Yukon River at St. Marys, Alaska.

Once in St. Marys, the barge was sunk from underneath Discovery III and she began the trip up the Yukon River to Fairbanks, Alaska. In order to make the journey as quickly as possible, Discovery III was driven up the river almost non-stop, with only occasional landings at villages for fuel and brief tours of the vessel by village residents. After a nine-day journey over 1,000 miles up the Yukon River drainage, the Discovery III arrived in Fairbanks on July 3, 1987. She was put into passenger service the following day, on July 4.

Since 1987, Discovery III has been the primary tour vessel operated by the Riverboat Discovery. She makes twice-daily trips throughout the summer from mid-May to mid-September on the Chena and Tanana Rivers.
