= Michelsen Island =

Geographical feature in Antarctica

Coordinates: 60°44′S 45°2′W

Location of Michelsen Island in the South Orkney Islands.

Michelsen Island is a small island in the South Orkney Islands off Antarctica. It is joined to the southern end of Powell Island by a narrow isthmus of occasionally submerged boulders. The island was first observed and roughly mapped in 1821 by Captains George Powell and Nathaniel Palmer. It was named on a map by Captain Petter Sørlle, a Norwegian whaler who made a running survey of the South Orkney Islands in 1912–13.

== Important Bird Area ==
The island lies within an Antarctic Specially Protected Area (ASPA 111). It is also part of the Southern Powell Island and adjacent islands Important Bird Area, identified as such by BirdLife International because it supports significant seabird breeding colonies.

== See also ==
- Ellefsen Harbour
- List of Antarctic and subantarctic islands
