= Rayner Point =

Rayner Point (60°39′S 45°10′W) is a point marked by a rocky peak forming the north side of the entrance to Gibbon Bay on the east coast of Coronation Island, in the South Orkney Islands. Charted in 1912–13 by Captain Petter Sorlle, a Norwegian whaler. Recharted in 1933 by DI personnel on the Discovery II and named for George W. Rayner, member of the zoological staff of the Discovery Committee.
