= Riverboat Discovery =

Tour company in Fairbanks, Alaska

- Company type: Family business (owned by the Binkley family)
- Industry: Tourism
- Founded: 1950
- Headquarters: Fairbanks, Alaska, United States
- Products: River tours
- Parent: Alaska Riverways, Inc.
- Website: http://www.riverboatdiscovery.com/

The Discovery III docked in Fairbanks, Alaska

The Riverboat Discovery is a tour company in Fairbanks, Alaska, which operates sternwheel riverboats on the Chena and Tanana rivers.

== History ==
The Riverboat Discovery business was founded in 1950 by Jim and Mary Binkley. The Binkleys were approached in 1950 by Alaska tourism entrepreneur Chuck West, who expressed interest in a local river tour in Fairbanks, Alaska, and asked if they could provide such a service. Mary and Jim initially operated a small converted missionary boat, the Godspeed, on tours of the rivers near Fairbanks.

The company's first sternwheeler, Discovery I, was built by Jim Binkley in his backyard in 1955 to accommodate more passengers. Later, more riverboats were added to the Discovery fleet; Discovery II was converted from a freighting steamboat in 1971, and Discovery III was built in 1987 at the Nichols Brothers Boat Builders shipyard on Whidbey Island near Seattle, Washington.

== Timeline ==
1898: Charles M. Binkley comes to Alaska during the Gold Rush, builds boats on the Yukon River.

1940: Jim Binkley goes to work as a deckhand on the Idler, a 62-foot sternwheel riverboat.

1942-1945: Jim Binkley is employed by the Army running freighting riverboats on Alaska's rivers.

1950: Jim and Mary Binkley start a tour business on the Chena and Tanana rivers using the Godspeed, a converted missionary boat.

1955: Jim Binkley builds the Discovery I in his Fairbanks backyard; Discovery Igoes into immediate passenger service.

1956-1960: The Discovery I is renovated during the winter months to accommodate more passengers.

1971: The Discovery II is built on the hull of the freighter Yutana. Discovery II takes over as the Riverboat Discovery's primary tour vessel.

1986-1987: The Discovery III is built in Whidbey Island, Washington. Discovery III goes into passenger service on July 4, 1987, taking over from Discovery II as the company's primary tour vessel.

2000: The Discovery II resumes passenger service after being mothballed for approximately 10 years for renovations.

2004: The Discovery I resumes light-duty operation as a vessel for special tours and charters.

== Present-day operations ==
As of 2025, all three Discovery sternwheelers are still in operation. The Riverboat Discovery operates daily tours and occasional charters with the sternwheelers from mid-May until mid-September. In addition to the sternwheelers, the company also operates a sizeable gift shop and dining hall at the landing from which the boats depart.

== Current fleet ==
Ship	Began Service	Tonnage	Length	Passenger Capacity	Passenger Decks
Discovery I	1955	34 tons	65 feet	150	2
Discovery II	1971	180 tons	116 feet	400	3
Discovery III	1987	280 tons	156 feet	900	4
