= Discovery I =

River boat

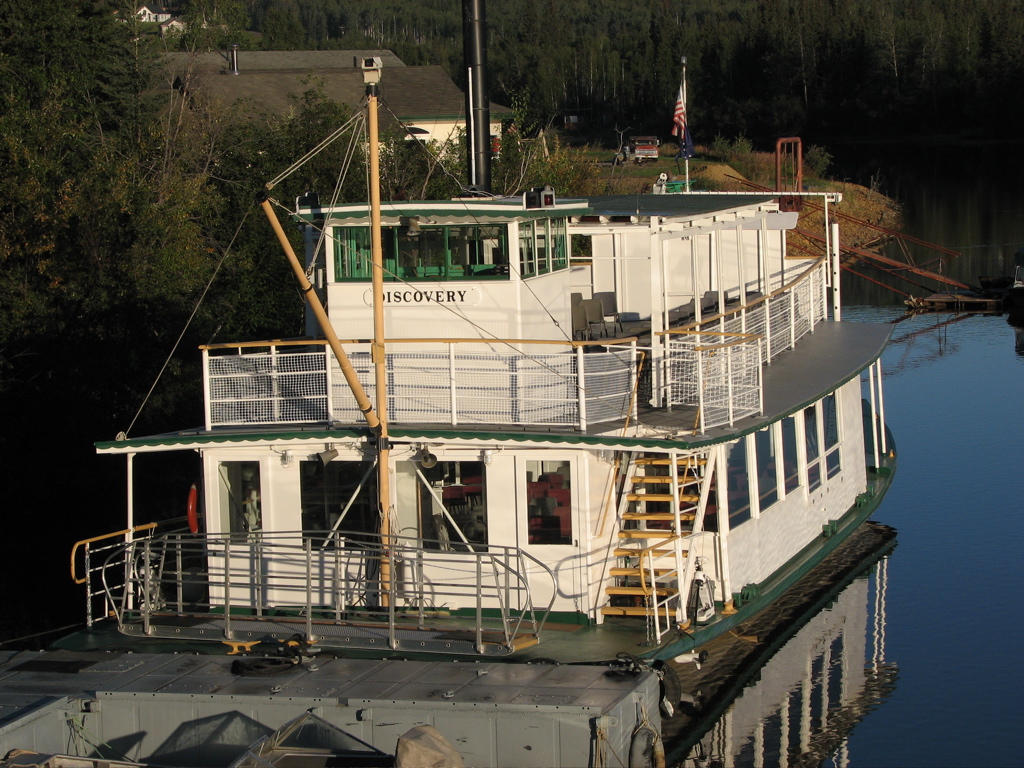
- The Discovery I docked near Fairbanks, Alaska.

History

United States
- Builder: Charles M. "Jim" Binkley Jr., Fairbanks, Alaska
- Laid down: 1954
- Launched: 1955
- Christened: 1955
- In service: 1955
- Home port: Fairbanks, Alaska
- Nickname(s): "D1"
- Status: Still in service

General characteristics
- Displacement: 34 tons
- Length: 65 ft (20 m)
- Beam: 20 ft (6.1 m)
- Draught: 1 ft 8 in (0.51 m)
- Capacity: 150
- Complement: 3 (Captain, First Mate, Deckhand)

The Discovery I is the smallest of three stern-wheel riverboats operated by the Riverboat Discovery in Fairbanks, Alaska. Built in 1955, the Discovery I is a tour vessel on the Chena and Tanana rivers.

== History ==
Discovery I was built by Captain Charles M. ("Jim") Binkley Jr., who had started a tour business on the rivers near Fairbanks, Alaska, in 1950. For the first five years of operation, Binkley used a converted missionary boat, the Godspeed, to conduct the tours. By 1954, Binkley was in need of a larger boat due to increased passenger volume, and made plans to build a stern-wheel riverboat similar to ones he had piloted earlier in his career as a riverboat captain.

After drawing up plans with a local architect, Binkley began construction of Discovery I in his back yard during the winter of 1955. The boat was complete early the next summer, and Captain Binkley put the newly christened Discovery I into immediate use in his tour business.

The initial passenger capacity of Discovery I was 49, but within a few years Binkley had expanded the boat's capacity twice. These expansions raised the number of passengers the vessel could carry to 80, and then to 150.

The Discovery I served as the Riverboat Discovery's main tour boat for 16 years, from its construction in 1955 to the construction of Discovery II in 1971. Binkley planned to expand the capacity of Discovery I beyond 150 through further remodeling, but the Coast Guard hesitated to certify the vessel for more passengers. The decision by the Coast Guard that Discovery I had reached its maximum passenger capacity precipitated the construction of Discovery II.

After Discovery II took over as the primary sternwheeler for the company, Discovery I was kept on in a standby status until the construction of Discovery III in 1987. After the construction of Discovery III, Discovery I 's license was surrendered, and for the next fourteen years, Discovery I was dry-docked. During the tenure of Discovery I 's dry-docking, periodic repairs and maintenance were performed, and in 2000, the Riverboat Discovery company brought her back into the fleet for the company's 50th anniversary.

Since 2000, Discovery I has been maintained by the Riverboat Discovery as a periodic tour vessel. Due to the relatively small capacity of Discovery I, she is no longer used for the company's regular tours, but takes on passengers on a semi-regular basis for special tours and charters.
