= The Turret =

The Turret (60°40′S 45°9′W) is a conspicuous rocky headland, 460 m high, at the south side of the entrance to Gibbon Bay on the east coast of Coronation Island, in the South Orkney Islands. Probably first sighted by Captain George Powell and Captain Nathaniel Palmer who discovered these islands in December 1821. Charted and given this descriptive name by DI personnel on the Discovery II in 1933.
