= Falkland Harbour =

Harbour at Powell Island in the South Orkney Islands

Falkland Harbour (60°44′S 45°3′W) is a harbour along the southwest side of Powell Island in the South Orkney Islands. It was charted by Norwegian whaling captain Petter Sorlle in 1912–13, and named for the floating whale factory Falkland which was badly damaged while entering the harbour in the 1912–13 season.
