= John Peaks =

The John Peaks (60°43′S 45°30′W) are prominent snow-covered peaks, 415 metres (1,360 ft) high, at the southern end of Coronation Island, north of Powell Island and east of Signy Island in the South Orkney Islands. They were probably first sighted by Captain George Powell and Captain Nathaniel Palmer, who discovered these islands in December 1821. The peaks were charted in 1933 by Discovery Investigations personnel on the Discovery II who named them for D.D. John, a member of the zoological staff of the Discovery Committee.
