= Grey Island (South Orkney Islands) =

Island in the Antarctic

Coordinates: 60°45′S 45°2′W

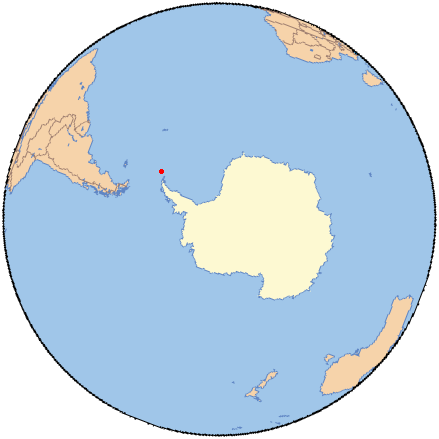
South Orkney Islands.

Grey Island is 1 km (0.62 mi) south of Michelsen Island and 2 km (1.2 mi) west of the southern part of Fredriksen Island, in the South Orkney Islands of Antarctica. It was first charted and named Holmen Graa (Grey Island) on a map by the Norwegian whaler Captain Petter Sorlle, who made a running survey of the South Orkney Islands in 1912–13. The anglicised form appears on the chart by Discovery Investigations personnel on the Discovery II who surveyed the islands in 1933.

== Important Bird Area ==
The island lies within an Antarctic Specially Protected Area (ASPA 111). It is also part of the Southern Powell Island and adjacent islands Important Bird Area (IBA), identified as such by BirdLife International because it supports significant seabird breeding colonies.

== See also ==
- List of Antarctic and subantarctic islands
