= Lewthwaite Strait =

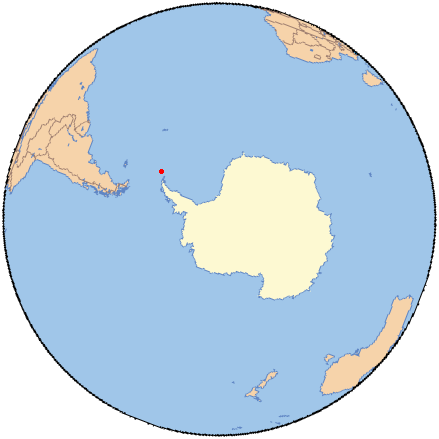
South Orkney Islands.

Lewthwaite Strait (60°42′S 45°7′W) is a passage 2.5 nautical miles (5 km) wide, lying between Coronation Island and Powell Island in the South Orkney Islands, Antarctica. It was discovered in December 1821, on the occasion of the joint cruise of Captain George Powell, a British sealer in the sloop Dove, and Captain Nathaniel Palmer, an American sealer in the sloop James Monroe. Mr. Lewthwaite was a teacher of navigation in Prince's Street, Rotherhithe, London; Captain Powell left the chart and journal of his Antarctic exploration with Lewthwaite before sailing on his last expedition, on which he met his death.
