= Moreton Point =

Headland of Antarctica

Coordinates: 60°37′S 46°2′W

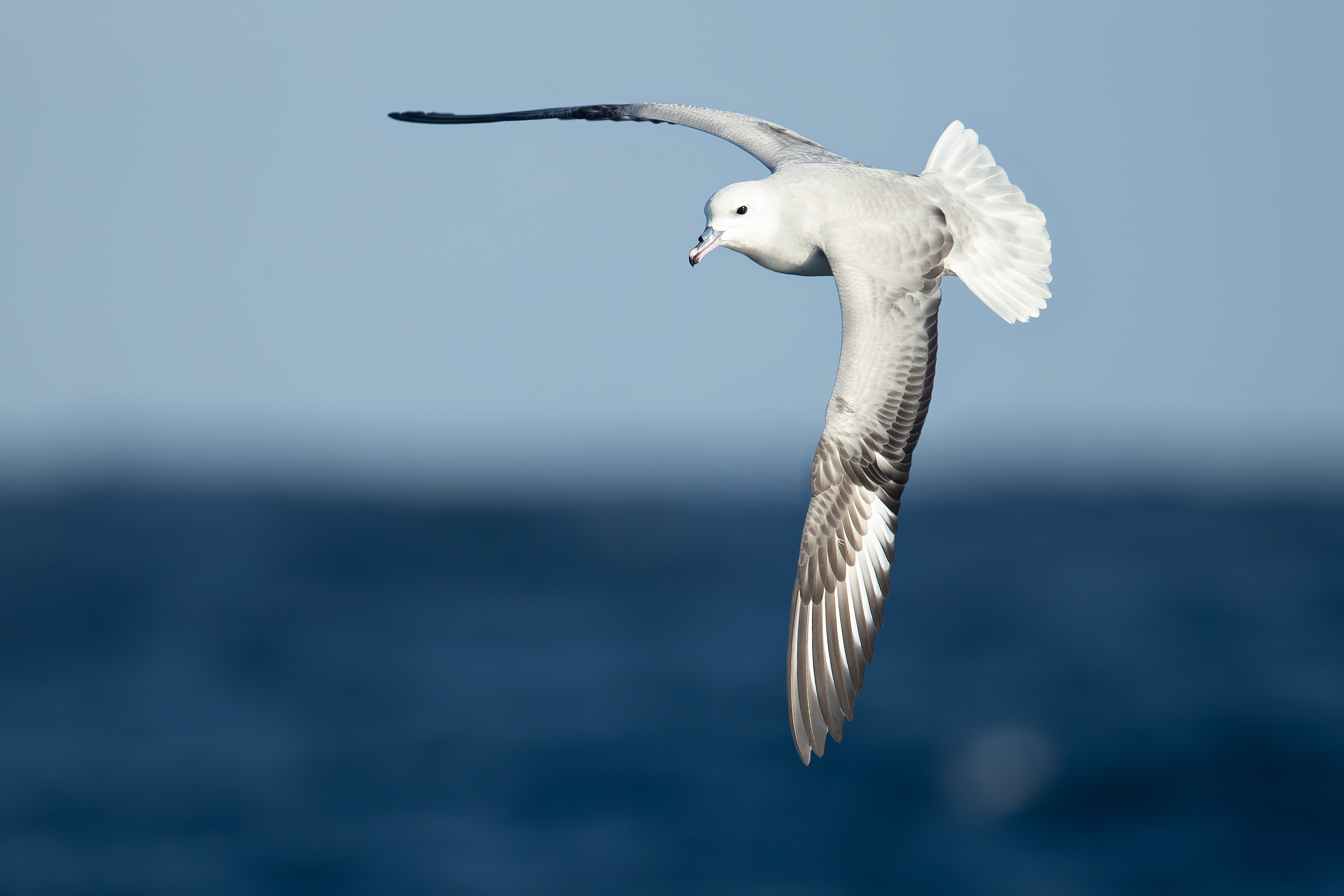
Southern fulmars breed in the IBA

Moreton Point is a point 1 nautical mile (2 km) north of Return Point at the western end of Coronation Island, in the South Orkney Islands off Antarctica. It was roughly charted by Captains George Powell and Nathaniel Palmer in 1821, and was named by Discovery Investigations personnel on the Discovery II who charted the islands in 1933.

== Important Bird Area ==
Moreton Point and an adjacent area of ice-free land, together with the nearby Larsen Islands, have been identified as a 1580 ha Important Bird Area (IBA) by BirdLife International because it supports large breeding colonies of seabirds, including some 125,000 pairs of chinstrap penguins and 125,000 pairs of southern fulmars. Snow petrels also nest there in smaller numbers.
