= Gibbon Bay =

Bay of Antarctica

Coordinates: 60°39′S 45°11′W

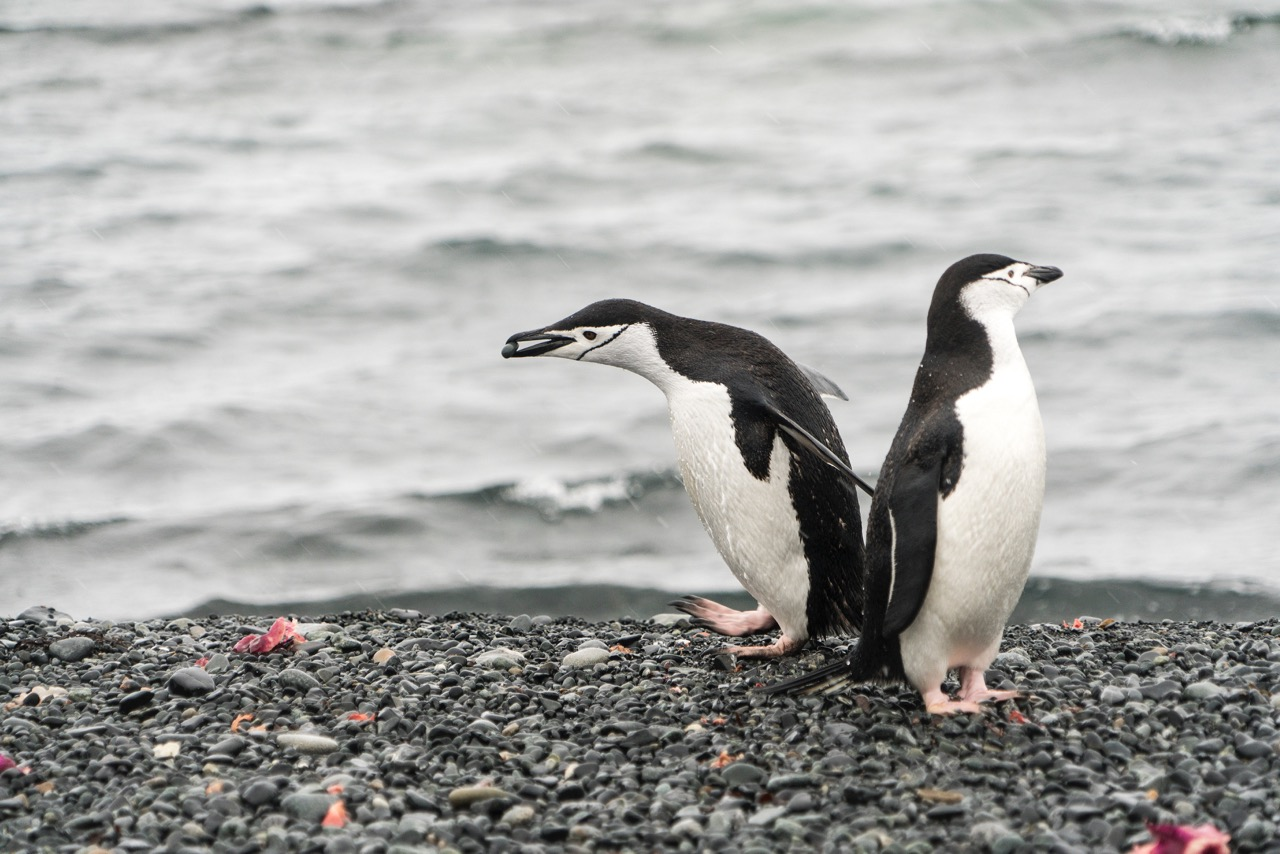
Chinstrap penguins breed in the IBA

Gibbon Bay is a bay 2 km (1.2 mi) long and wide, entered between Rayner Point and The Turret along the east coast of Coronation Island, in the South Orkney Islands of Antarctica. The bay was first seen in December 1821 by Captain George Powell and Captain Nathaniel Palmer, but was more accurately delineated on a 1912 chart by Captain Petter Sorlle. It was recharted in 1933 by Discovery Investigations personnel on the Discovery II and named for the ship's surgeon, Dr G.M. Gibbon.

== Important Bird Area ==
The bay has been identified as an Important Bird Area (IBA) by BirdLife International because it supports a large breeding colony of about 13,000 pairs of chinstrap penguins as well as being a nesting site for snow petrels.
