= Discovery II =

- The Discovery II landing in the Tanana River near Fairbanks, Alaska.

History

United States
- Builder: Charles M. "Jim" Binkley Jr. & Iver Johnson, Fairbanks, Alaska
- Laid down: 1970
- Launched: 1971
- In service: 1971
- Homeport: Fairbanks, Alaska
- Nickname(s): "D2"
- Status: In service
- Notes: The Discovery II was built on the hull of the 'Yutana', a former freight boat.

General characteristics
- Displacement: 180 tons
- Length: 116 ft (35 m)
- Beam: 29 ft (8.8 m)
- Draught: 2 ft 6 in (0.76 m)
- Propulsion: 6-cylinder Detroit diesel 671 powering a 14 ft-diameter (4.3 m) paddlewheel
- Capacity: 396
- Complement: 5-6 (Captain, First Mate, 3-4 deckhands)

Discovery II, built in 1971, is the second of three Discovery sternwheel riverboats operated by the Riverboat Discovery company. Discovery II is still in use as a tour vessel on the Chena and Tanana rivers near Fairbanks, Alaska.

== History ==
Discovery II began its life in 1953 as the Yutana, a freight boat hauling goods on the Yukon and Tanana rivers (hence its name, a combination of the names of the two rivers). Captain Jim Binkley purchased the Yutana in 1967 after its effective freighting life was over, and until 1970 it was drydocked on the Chena River near Fairbanks, Alaska.

In 1971, Jim Binkley was in need of a larger sternwheel riverboat with which to conduct his daily river tours (his first sternwheeler, Discovery I, frequently reached its maximum capacity of 150 passengers), and decided to convert the Yutana into a passenger vessel. Together with his friend Iver Johnson, Jim Binkley renovated the Yutana and rechristened her the Discovery II. She went into service immediately upon the completion of the conversion.

For the following fifteen years, Discovery II was the Riverboat Discovery's primary tour vessel; her passenger capacity was nearly 400, a more than twofold increase over Discovery I. In addition to increased capacity, Discovery II also proved mechanically reliable, embarking on over 5,000 trips without a single mechanical delay. By the mid-1980s, however, a growing tourism industry meant that Discovery II, like Discovery I before it, was becoming too small for the Riverboat Discovery's needs.

The increased number of passengers straining Discovery II 's capacity precipitated the design and construction of the third Riverboat Discovery sternwheeler, Discovery III, in 1986-1987. Discovery III, with a passenger capacity of 900, went into service in July 1987. After Discovery III took over as the Riverboat Discovery's primary tour vessel, the Discovery II went into drydock for repairs and renovation.

After approximately 10 years on the drydock, Discovery II was relicensed and brought back into service in 1999 in preparation for the Riverboat Discovery's fiftieth anniversary, as well as to handle an increased number of passengers serviced by the company. Since then, Discovery II has been used on a regular basis to augment the passenger capacity of Discovery III on regular tours, as well as for special tours and charters.
