= George Frederick Cruchley =

English map-maker, engraver and publisher

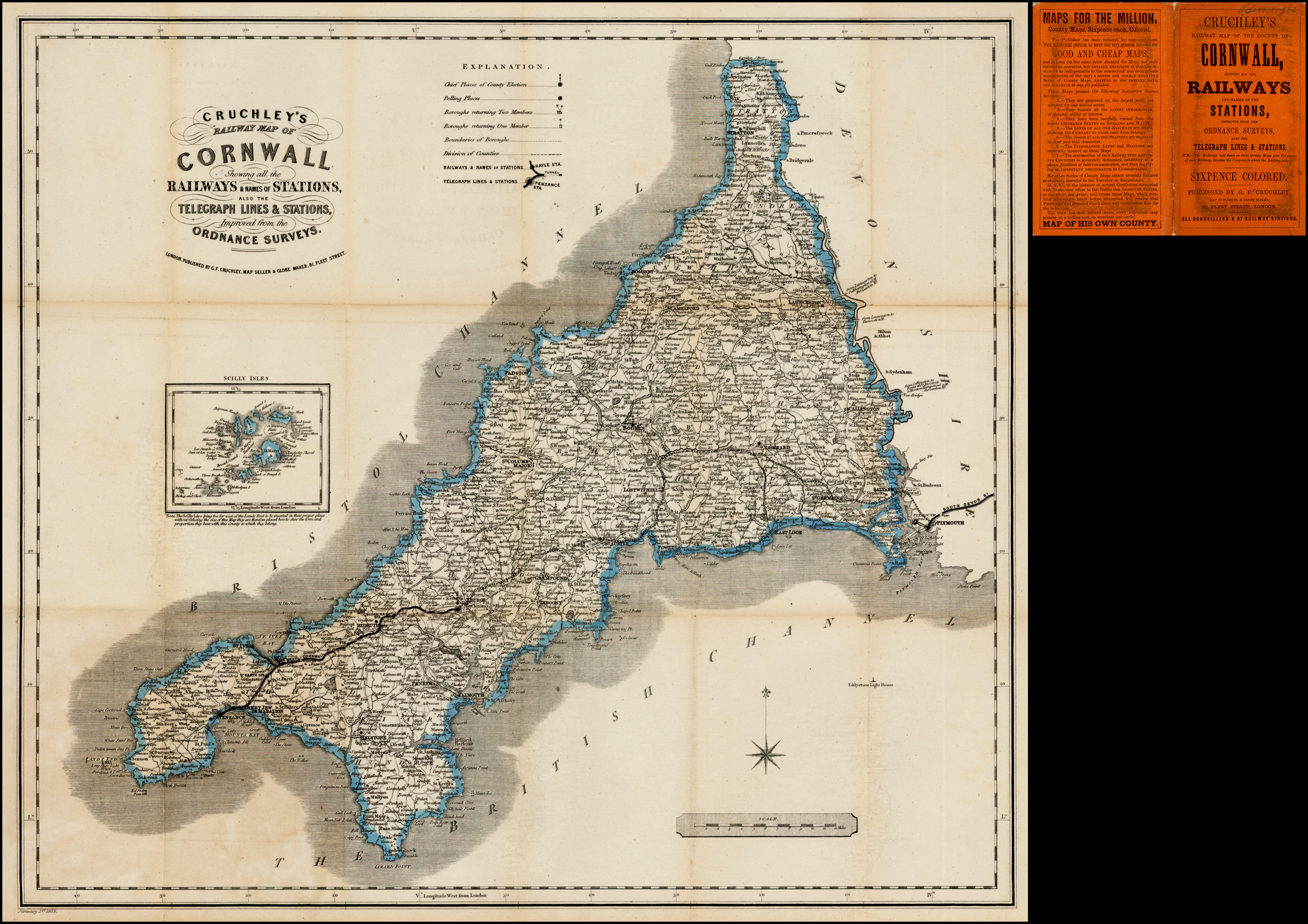
Cruchley's Railway Map of the County of Cornwall &c., c. 1850.

George Frederick Cruchley (1797–1880) was an English map-maker, engraver and publisher based in London.

== Selected publications ==
- London guide: A handbook for strangers &c. London: G.F. Cruchley, 1862.
