= Christoffersen Island =

Island in Antarctica

Coordinates: 60°44′S 45°3′W

Location of Christoffersen Island in the South Orkney Islands.

Christoffersen Island is a small island immediately west of the southern end of Powell Island in the South Orkney Islands of Antarctica. The name appears on a chart by Norwegian whaling captain Petter Sorlle, who made a running survey of these islands in 1912–13.

== Important Bird Area ==
The island lies within an Antarctic Specially Protected Area (ASPA 111). It is also part of the Southern Powell Island and adjacent islands Important Bird Area (IBA), identified as such by BirdLife International because it supports significant seabird breeding colonies. The island has hosted breeding pairs of the gentoo penguin, the Adélie penguin and the southern giant petrel.

== See also ==
- Ellefsen Harbour
- List of Antarctic and subantarctic islands
