= Fredriksen Island =

Island in Antarctica

Coordinates: 60°44′S 44°59′W

Location of Fredriksen Island in the South Orkney Islands.

Fredriksen Island is an island 5 km (3.1 mi) long and 1 km (0.62 mi) wide, lying 1 km south-east of Powell Island in the South Orkney Islands of Antarctica. It was discovered by Captains Nathaniel Palmer and George Powell in the course of their joint cruise in December 1821. It was named by Norwegian whaling captain Petter Sorlle, who made a running survey of the island in the 1912–13 summer.

== Important Bird Area ==
The island lies within an Antarctic Specially Protected Area (ASPA 111). It is also part of the Southern Powell Island and adjacent islands Important Bird Area (IBA), identified as such by BirdLife International because it supports significant seabird breeding colonies.

== See also ==
- Cape Barlas
- List of Antarctic and subantarctic islands
