= Larsen Islands =

Islands of Antarctica

Coordinates: 60°36′S 46°04′W

Location of the Larsen Islands

The Larsen Islands are a small group of islands north-west of Moreton Point, the western extremity of Coronation Island, in the South Orkney Islands of Antarctica. They were discovered by Captains George Powell and Nathaniel Palmer on the occasion of their joint cruise in December 1821. The islands were named on Petter Sørlle's chart, based upon his survey of the South Orkney Islands in 1912–1913, in honour of Carl Anton Larsen.

The islands were recharted in 1933 by Discovery Investigations (DI) personnel on the Discovery II, who used the name Larsen Islands for the group and named the largest island Larsen Island. This scheme was found to be confusing, so Larsen Island was renamed in 1954 by the UK Antarctic Place-names Committee (UK-APC) for the sloop James Monroe, which was commanded by Captain Palmer at the time of discovery and anchored in this vicinity in December 1821.

== Monroe Island ==
The largest island of the group, Monroe Island, lies about 10 km from Coronation. Veitch Point is a point situated centrally along the northeast end of the island. Sphinx Rock lies immediately off the southwest end of Monroe Island. Both features were charted and named by DI personnel.

== Important Bird Area ==
The Larsen Islands, together with neighbouring Moreton Point and an adjacent area of ice-free land to the west, have been identified as a 1580 ha Important Bird Area (IBA) by BirdLife International because it supports large breeding colonies of seabirds, including some 125,000 pairs of chinstrap penguins and 125,000 pairs of southern fulmars. Snow petrels also nest there in smaller numbers.

== See also ==
- List of Antarctic and Subantarctic islands
