= Powell Island =

One of the South Orkney Islands of Antarctica

- Location of Powell Island in the South Orkney Islands

- Location within Antarctica

Geography
- Location: Antarctica
- Coordinates: 60.683°S 45.033°W
- Archipelago: South Orkney Islands
- Length: 13 km (8.1 mi)
- Width: 4 km (2.5 mi)

Administration
- Administered under the Antarctic Treaty System

Demographics
- Population: Uninhabited

Powell Island is a narrow island 13 km (8.1 mi) long and 4 km (2.5 mi) wide, lying between Coronation and Laurie Islands in the central part of the South Orkney Islands of Antarctica. Its southern end lies 7 km east of the south-western extremity of Coronation Island, between Lewthwaite Strait and Washington Strait. A steep-sided rocky ridge forms the western part of the island; to the east of it lies a broad icy piedmont which is visibly supported in the east by a few low-lying rock outcrops.,

== History ==
The island was discovered in the course of the joint cruise by Captains George Powell and Nathaniel Palmer in December 1821. It was correctly charted, though unnamed, on Powell's map published in 1822; it was subsequently named for Powell on an Admiralty chart of 1839.

== Birds ==
An area including part of southern Powell Island (south of John Peaks on Coronation Island), along with neighbouring Christoffersen, Fredriksen, Michelsen and Grey Islands, with some other (unnamed) islands lying offshore, has been identified as a 2688 ha Important Bird Area (IBA) by BirdLife International as it supports several significant seabird breeding colonies. The boundary of the IBA is defined by the boundary of Antarctic Specially Protected Area (ASPA) 111.

== See also ==
- Ellefsen Harbour
- Falkland Harbour
- List of Antarctic and subantarctic islands
