= George Powell (sealer) =

English sealer, explorer and amateur naturalist

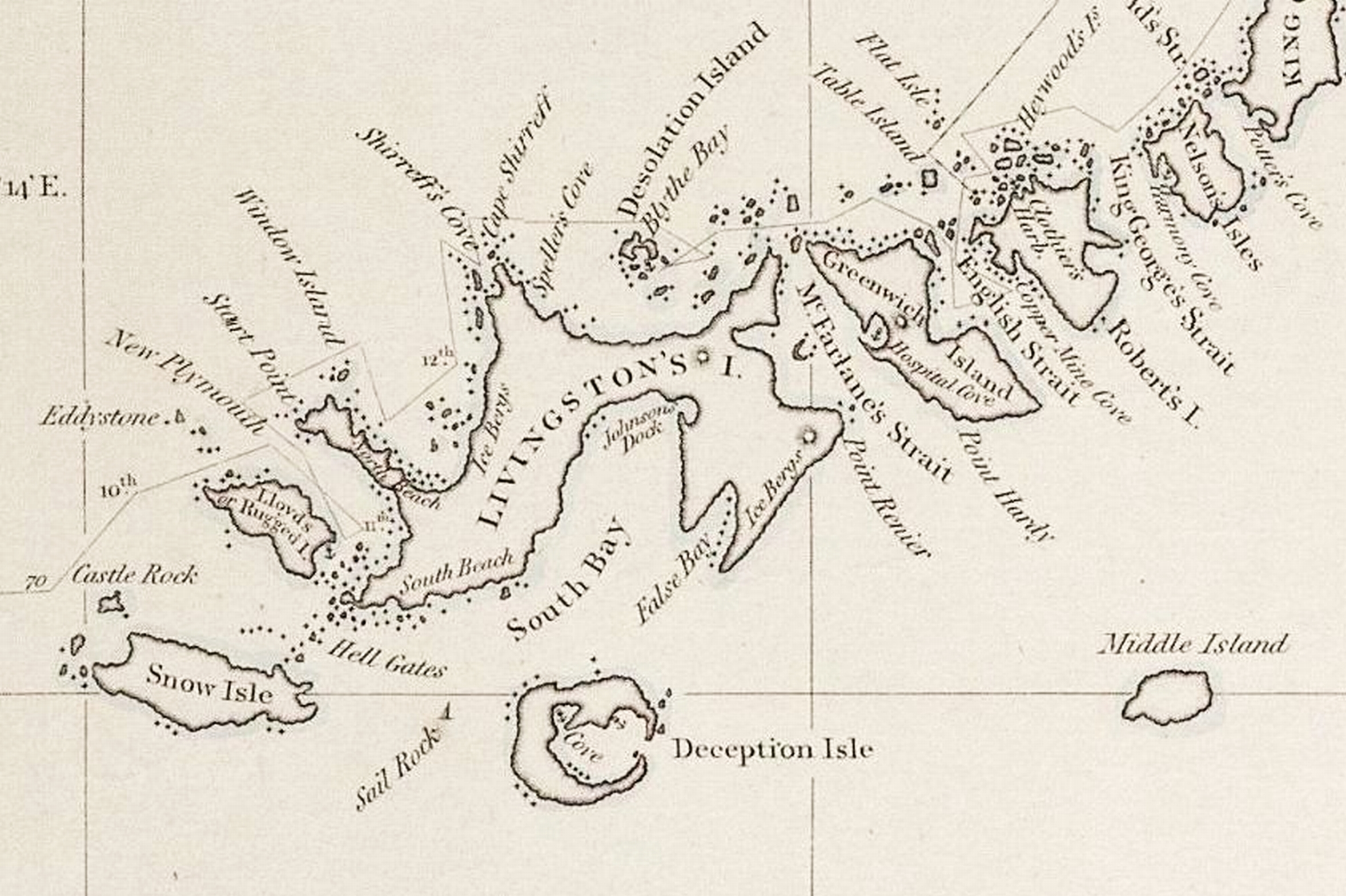
Fragment of George Powell's 1822 chart; the track is that of his sloop Dove in November 1821

George Powell (1794–1824) was an English sealer, explorer and amateur naturalist. He captained three sealing expeditions to the Antarctic Ocean between 1818 and 1822.

Powell was born in London. During his first expedition, in 1818 and 1819, he captained the sloop Dove and visited South Georgia and Kerguelen Islands. His second expedition, captaining Eliza, lasted from 1819 until 1821, during which time he visited the Falkland Islands and the South Shetland Islands.

In 1821 and 1822 he took both Dove, which he captained, and Eliza, captained by John Wright, on another sealing expedition to the South Shetland Islands, for which he produced a very fine chart based on his own observations of the north coast of the group and the observations of others for the southern coast. On 6 December 1821, he co-discovered the South Orkney Islands along with American Nathaniel Palmer, claiming them in the name of King George IV.

Powell's chart of the South Shetlands, published in 1822, also drew on information from other captains, possibly including Andrew MacFarlane, who is possibly the first to land on continental Antarctica. William James Mills associates the name with MacFarlane, while noting that Nathaniel Palmer explored the strait in November 1820.

Both Powell Island and Powell Basin are named after him. He died in Tonga.
