= Tommy Turtle =

British Army soldier (1950–2020)

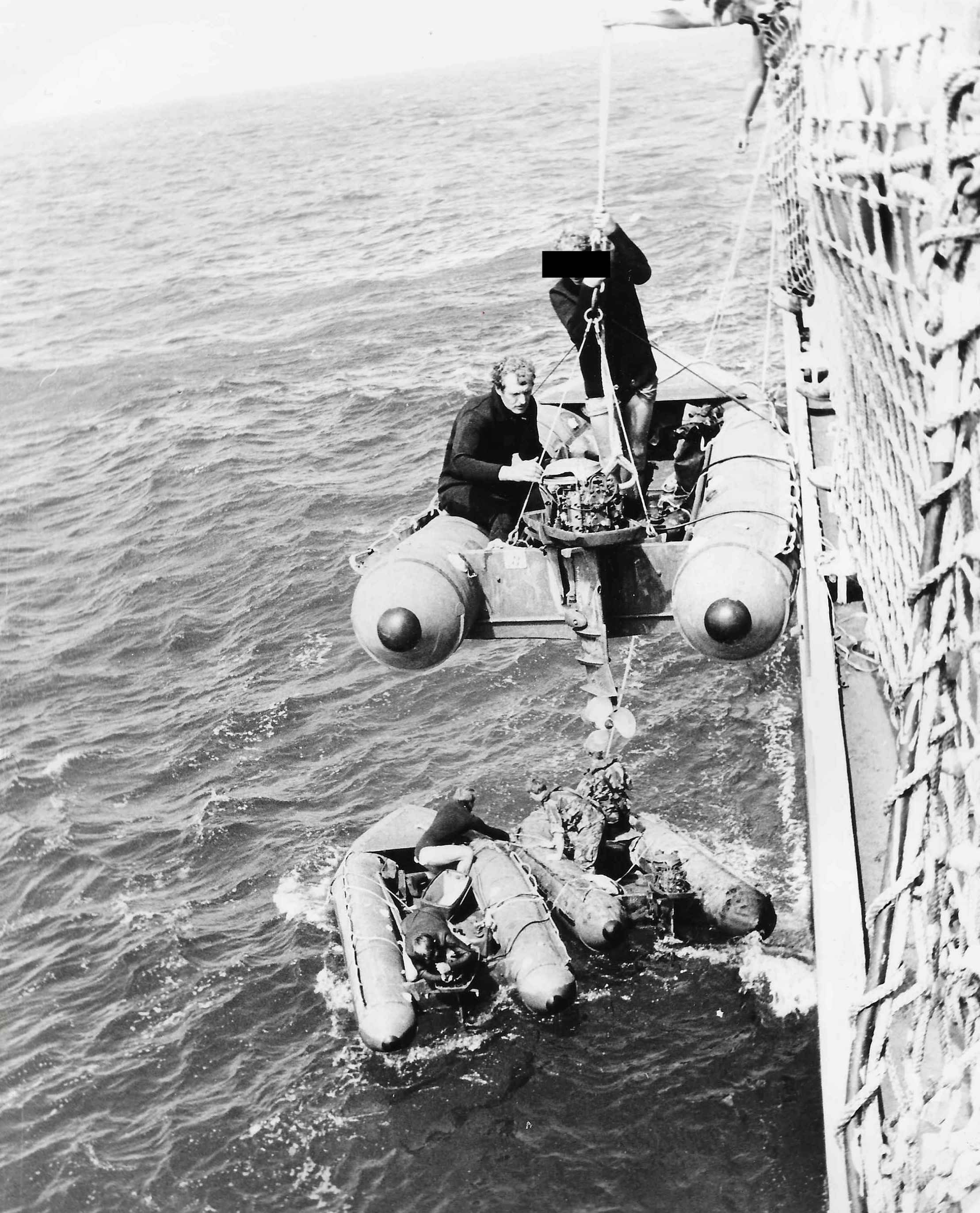
Tommy Turtle (left) with Geminis

Thomas James Turtle BEM (24 December 1950 – 29 December 2020), known as Touché or Tommy Turtle, was a British Army soldier originally from Ireland who took part in many special forces campaigns, including the Falklands War and the Bosnian War.

After serving in the Royal Irish Rangers and the Special Air Service, he became an officer of the Royal Irish Regiment.

== Early life ==
The eldest of the five children of James Turtle, a Protestant from Northern Ireland, and his wife Mary Turtle, a Roman Catholic from south of the border, Tommy Turtle was brought up mostly in the Republic of Ireland and left school at the age of fourteen. He worked in a woollen mill and had other jobs, then when he was sixteen he was accepted into the reserves of the Irish Army. Shortly after that, he joined the Royal Irish Rangers.

== British Army ==
In his early years in the British Army, Turtle served in West Germany, Gibraltar, and the Middle East. Unusually, he graduated from the Parachute Regiment Battle School at Brecon, although not a member of the regiment, and in 1977 was accepted into the Special Air Service (SAS).

With the SAS, in 1982 Turtle took part in several actions of the Falklands War. He was by then a corporal.

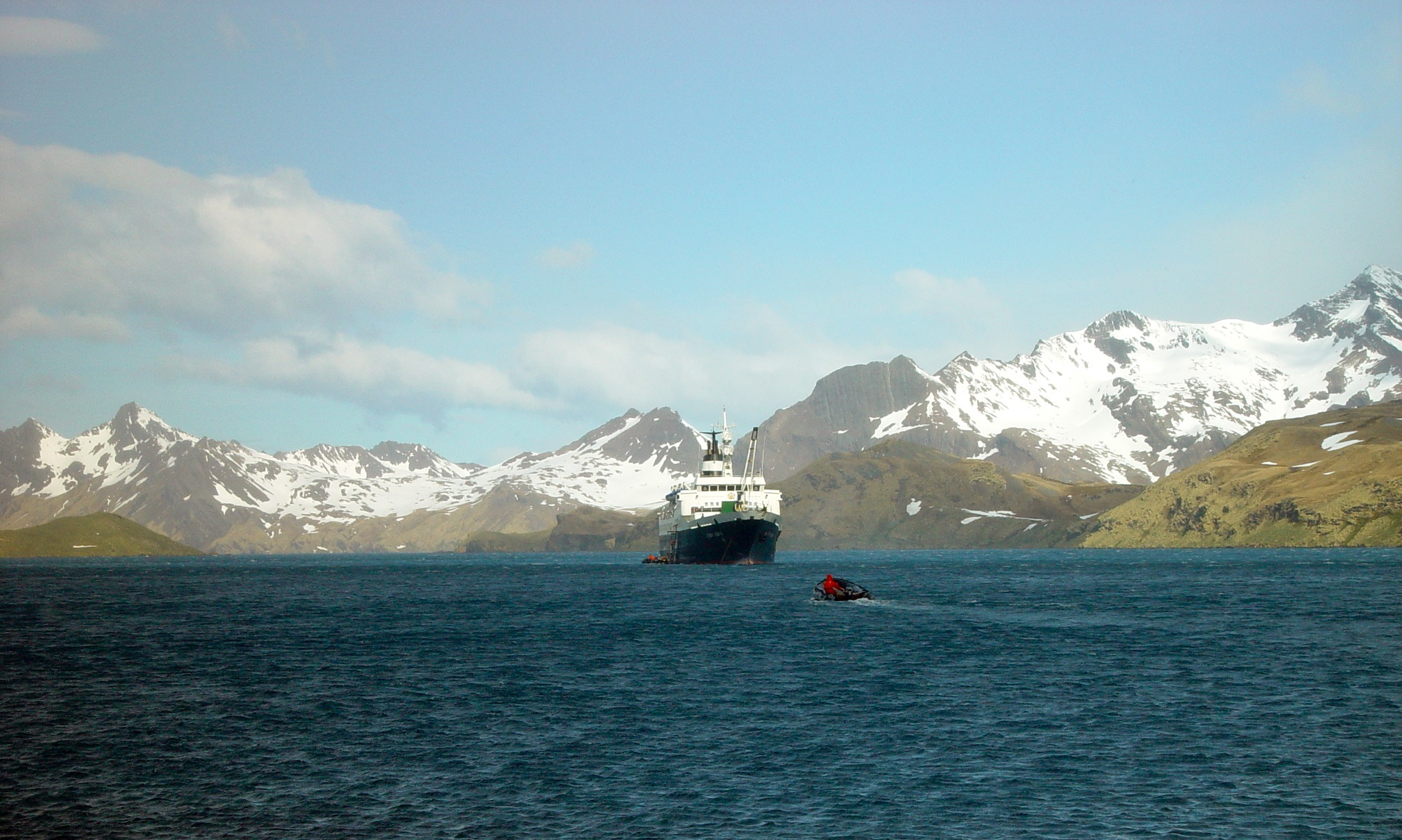
Stromness Bay, South Georgia

On the night of 22 April, with 17 Troop of 22 SAS, D Squadron, Turtle took part in the reconnaissance phase of Operation Paraquet, a combined action to recover South Georgia. Among other deployments, five Gemini rigid inflatable boats from HMS Antrim were used to get soldiers of Turtle's Troop onto Grass Island. Three of the boat engines failed, and after Antrim had left the scene the wind got up to Gale Force 9. After towing one boat to shore, Turtle went back to search for the three others. The next day, the men had to climb a cliff in sub-zero temperatures, before setting up an observation post. They reported no Argentine activity, then signalled an SOS to HMS Endurance, which was steaming into Stromness Bay, to be airlifted out the next day by the ship's Westland Wasp helicopter. After that, 17 Troop called itself "The South Georgia Boating Club".

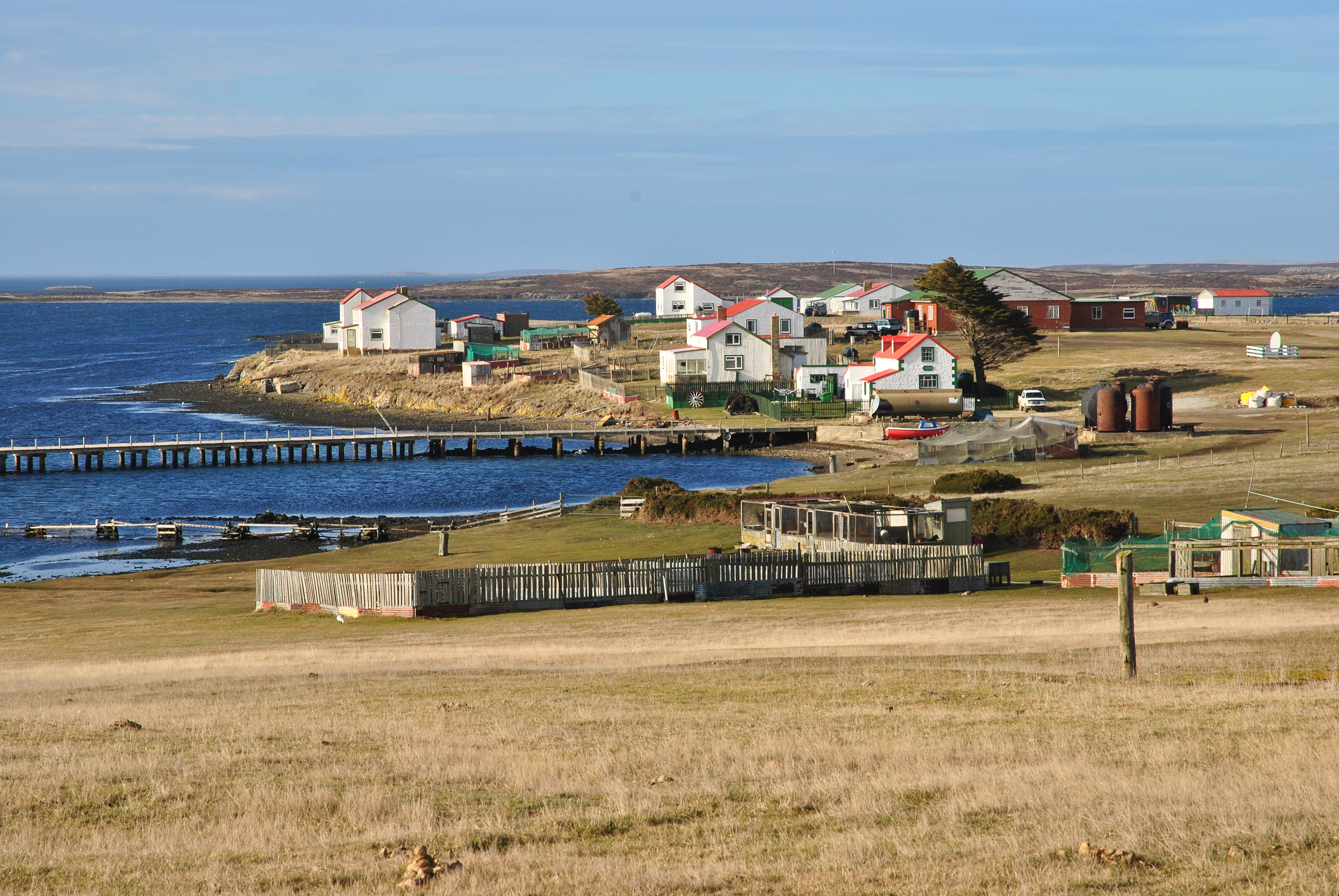
Goose Green, Falkland Islands

During the early hours of 12 May, with eight members of D Squadron, using two-man canvas canoes, Turtle went behind enemy lines to reconnoitre an airfield on Pebble Island, before his squadron attacked it on 15 May to destroy aircraft, radar, and an ammunition dump, with supporting gunfire from HMS Glamorgan. He went on to take part in a raid on Goose Green at the time of the main British forces landings, a gunfight on Bluff Cove Peak, routing Argentine Special Forces, and an SAS attack on Cortley Ridge in boats, just before the Argentine surrender.

After the Falklands, Turtle joined 21 SAS (Volunteers) as an instructor, before returning to a long Royal Irish Rangers posting in Northern Ireland, where in June 1983 he was an Acting Sergeant and was mentioned in despatches for gallant and distinguished service between November 1982 and January 1983. In October 1988, while serving as a staff sergeant in the Royal Irish Rangers, he was awarded the British Empire Medal (Military Division) for meritorious service in Northern Ireland. In 1990, he became a warrant officer at the International Long-Range Reconnaissance Patrol School of the British Army of the Rhine. On 31 May 1992, he was commissioned as a second lieutenant into the newly merged Royal Irish Regiment, with four years’ added seniority, and the same day was promoted to lieutenant. This was first gazetted in June as a commission into the Parachute Regiment, and re-gazetted in July. In 1995, he returned to the SAS to serve in Bosnia, where he had an advisory role and was at the side of the US General Bill Nash at his evening briefings. His later appointments were in the Directorate of Special Forces, and he served again in the Middle East before retiring to civilian life in 2005.

== Private life ==
In the summer of 1980, at Hereford, the headquarters of the SAS, Turtle married Margaret McQuillan. They had two sons, Thomas and James, and four grandchildren, William, Freddie, Archie and Matilda. He died of cancer on 29 December 2020, aged 70. An obituary said of him that he was "a tall, strongly built Irishman possessed of good looks, charm, a gentle brogue and a genial but resolute disposition."
