= Grass Island =

Grass Island can refer to

- Grass Island, Hong Kong
- Grass Island (Canada)
- Grass Island, South Georgia
- Grass Island (Hawaii), a small island located in Midway Atoll
