= Operation Paraquet =

British military operation to recapture South Georgia in April 1982

- Part of the Falklands War
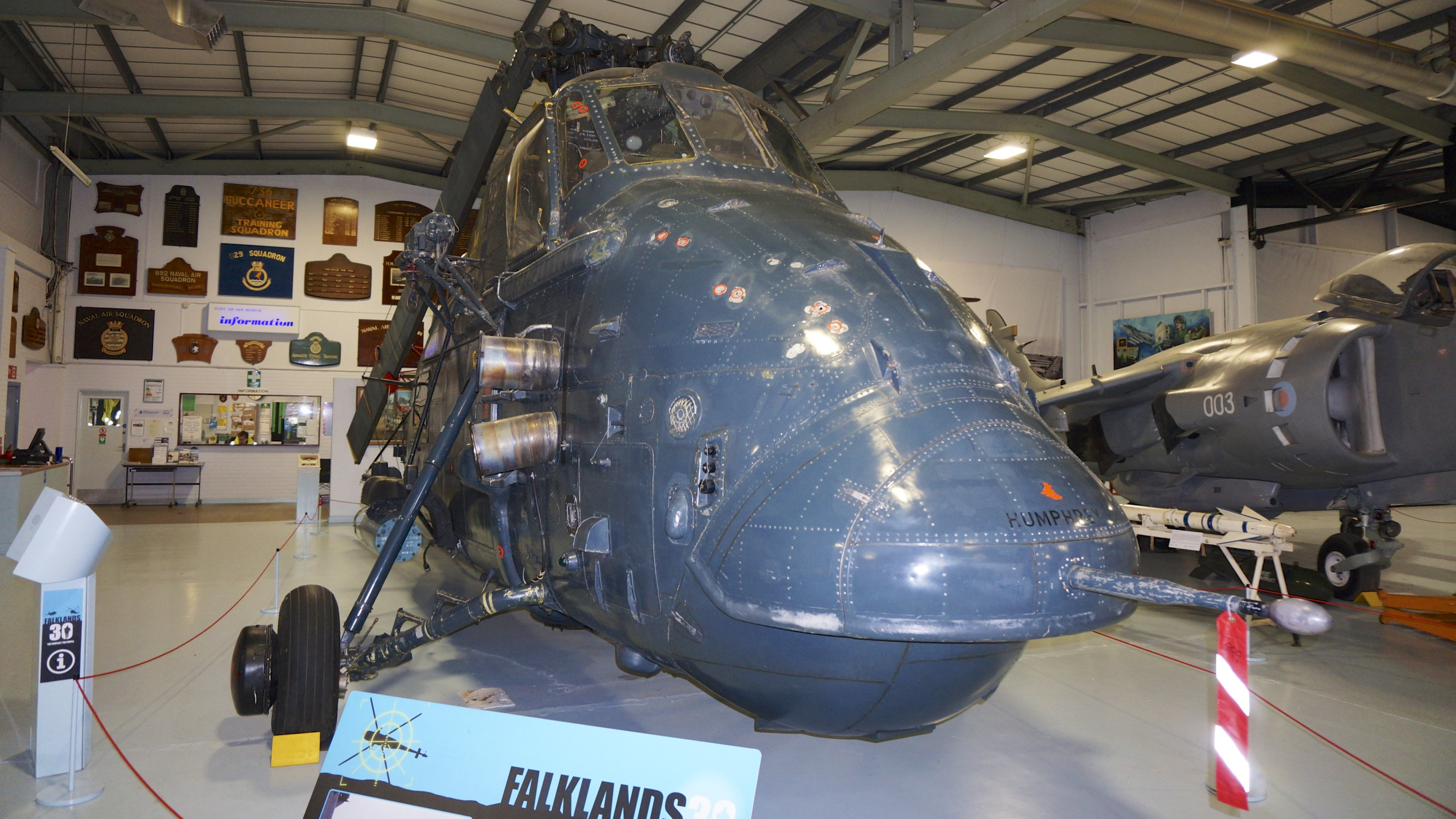
- Antrim's Wessex HAS3, nicknamed "Humphrey", preserved at the Fleet Air Arm Museum, played a crucial role in the operation
Date	25 April 1982
Location	South Georgia Island
Result	British victory
Territorial changes	South Georgia liberated from Argentine Occupation by Royal Marines

Belligerents
United Kingdom: Locals	Argentina

Commanders and leaders
(United Kingdom) Brian Young; (United Kingdom) Guy Sheridan	(Argentina) Luis Lagos (POW); (Argentina) Horacio Bicain (POW); (Argentina) Alfredo Astiz (POW)

Units involved
(United Kingdom) Royal Navy: Royal Marines; SAS	(Argentina) Argentine Navy: Argentine Marines

Strength
1 destroyer; 2 frigates; 1 submarine; 1 patrol ship; 8 helicopters; 250 ground troops	1 submarine; 90 ground troops

Casualties and losses
2 helicopters	1 submarine; 1 killed; 1 wounded; 155 captured

Operation Paraquet was the code name for the British military operation to recapture the island of South Georgia from Argentine military control in April 1982 at the start of the Falklands War.

The operation, a subsidiary of the main Operation Corporate—recapture of the Falkland Islands from Argentina—was successful, leading to the island being restored to British control on 25 April 1982.

Officially named "Operation Paraquet", an alternative spelling of parakeet, it was known among British troops as "Paraquat", after the industrial weedkiller.

== Background ==
Prompted by the British war cabinet who needed a demonstration of political resolve, the operation was ordered by Admiral John Fieldhouse at Northwood Headquarters and planned by staff at 3 Commando Brigade. Major General Jeremy Moore of the Royal Marines was told to provide a Commando company group for a secret mission. Originally selecting 45 Commando who had recently completed jungle warfare training, the final selection was 42 Commando who had recently been on a winter deployment to Norway. The second-in-command of 42 Commando, Major Guy Sheridan, an experienced mountaineer, was selected to be Landing Force Commander. M Company of 42 Commando, commanded by Captain Chris Nunn, was augmented by specialists from the Reconnaissance Troop, the Support Company, signals and medics; a total of 132 men.

Sheridan requested the support of the Royal Marine Mountain and Arctic Warfare Cadre, but was instead given 19 (Mountain) Troop from D Squadron Special Air Service (SAS) from Ascension Island. In the event, the whole of D Squadron comprising not only the Mountain Troop, but also 16 (Mobility) Troop, 18 (Air) Troop and 17 (Boat) Troop along with the Squadron HQ all joined the force at Ascension. Finally, 2 Troop, Special Boat Squadron (2 SBS) and, as requested by Sheridan, two Naval Gunfire Forward Observation Parties (NGFOs) also joined the task group.

The already crowded accommodations in available ships became difficult with the inclusion of additional troops. The task group sailed from Ascension on 11 April, pausing to redistribute the SAS troops between ships on 13 April. The final disposition was that M Company were on the tanker RFA Tidespring, 2 SBS, and the Mountain and Boat Troops SAS on the frigate, HMS Plymouth, with the rest of D Squadron on HMS Antrim. Finally, 6 SBS were embarked in the submarine HMS Conqueror. This group, known as CTG 317.9 or Task Force South Georgia, was commanded by Captain Brian Young of Antrim.

The task group met with HMS Endurance on 14 April and on the following day, received written orders (dropped by an RAF Nimrod aircraft) for the operation from Admiral Fieldhouse dated 12 April and giving a landing date of 21 April.

British ships involved in Operation Paraquet (South Georgia, April 1982)
Ship	Type	Role / Action
Antrim	County-class destroyer	Flagship of the task group, rescued stranded SAS on Fortuna Glacier, coordinated Wessex, Lynx and Wasp helicopter strikes on Santa Fe, and provided the landing force that accepted the Argentine surrender.
Plymouth	Rothesay-class frigate	Delivered naval bombardment demonstration that prompted Argentine surrender, ships Wasp fired AS.12 missiles at Santa Fe .
Brilliant	Type 22 frigate	Lynx helicopter to attack the Santa Fe, providing anti-submarine warfare support.
Endurance	Ice patrol ship	Deployed Wasp helicopter to engage Santa Fe, landed FOO ashore to coordinate naval gunfire support.
Tidespring	Tide-class oiler	Held the main expected landing force of M Company, 42 Commando, later evacuated POW' and civilians.
Conqueror	Nuclear submarine	Conducted early reconnaissance and provided deterrence in the area before the landing.

== Reconnaissance phase ==
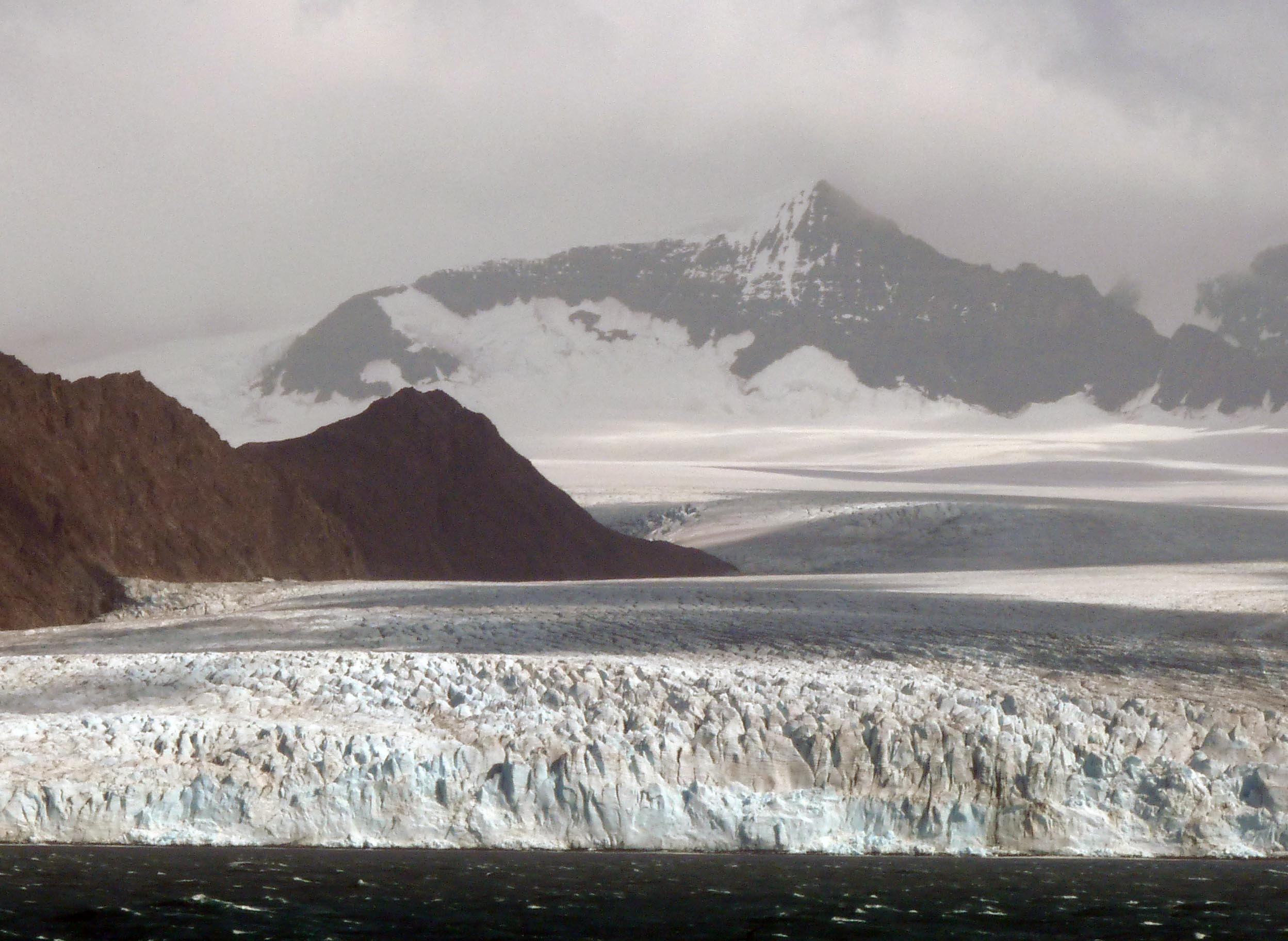
Fortuna Glacier, South Georgia

Conqueror was first on the scene, arriving off South Georgia on 18 April and carrying out a survey of key areas of the coast. She then withdrew to the northwest of the island to guard against any potential threats from the Argentine navy.

For the British, the first order of business was to carry out reconnaissance of Argentinian positions, whose forces and dispositions were unknown, though there was no evidence to suggest they had been reinforced since the initial occupation of the island on 3 April. The plan called for insertion of three SBS patrols at Hound Bay, who would then travel by land and Gemini inflatable boat across Cumberland East Bay and set up an observation post at Brown Mountain overlooking Grytviken. The SAS plan was more ambitious, and called for a helicopter insertion of Mountain Troop, D squadron, on Fortuna Glacier, 8 miles west of Stromness. From there the unit would travel across the glacier, and reconnoitre Leith, Husvik, Stromness and East Fortuna bay. The SAS chose Fortuna glacier as the point of entry as it was sufficiently far from expected enemy positions so as to preclude detection, and the Argentines would not expect an attack from that direction. This choice was opposed by officers who had knowledge of local conditions, such as Captain Nick Barker of Endurance and members of the British Antarctic Survey (BAS), who felt that the difficulties of travelling on the glacier were being underestimated. However, Major Cedric Delves, officer commanding D squadron, overruled their objections, and as the SAS had strong political backing within the British government, the plan was eventually put into action.

On 20 April, an RAF Victor based on Ascension carried out a radar reconnaissance of 150,000 square miles of South Atlantic, including South Georgia, remaining in flight for 14 hours and 45 minutes. On the same day, the Task Force arrived at its destination, and Endurance moved into Saint Andrews Bay to make contact with isolated BAS field parties.

On the next day, the 15 men of Mountain troop, led by Captain Gavin Hamilton, were airlifted onto Fortuna glacier by two Wessex helicopters. They were immediately confronted with extreme conditions including 100 mph winds and freezing temperatures. Deep crevasses slowed the advance, and when the men attempted to set up camp and wait out the storm, their tents were swept away by the wind. Finally, after 15 hours on the glacier, Captain Hamilton requested evacuation, with the message "Unable to move. Environmental casualties imminent." Three Wessex helicopters were dispatched from the Task Force: two Wessex Mk5s from Tidespring and one Mk3 from Antrim. After one failed attempt, they managed to locate and embark the stranded SAS men, but in whiteout conditions, one pilot became disorientated and his aircraft crashed. The passengers were loaded onto the two remaining helicopters, but soon afterwards one of these hit a ridge and crashed, though once again without fatalities but resulting in a number of injured. The last Wessex, Antrim′s Mk3, after having offloaded its troops on board the destroyer returned to the glacier and after two failed attempts managed to retrieve the downed SAS and aircrew, though their equipment had to be abandoned. The pilot, Lieutenant Commander Ian Stanley, managed to nurse his overloaded aircraft back to Antrim and make an emergency landing on her flight deck, for which he was later awarded the Distinguished Service Order.

Meanwhile, the SBS insertion fared little better. On 22 April, four men of 2 SBS were landed from Endurance by Wasp helicopter at Hound Bay, where the local BAS team informed them that no Argentines were in the area. On the next day, an attempt to insert reinforcements by helicopter was foiled by strong winds, and Endurance had to approach within 800 yards of the coast in order to land the remaining SBS in Gemini inflatable boats. After having spent a night at Dartmouth Point, the troop moved on foot through Sörling Valley to the foot of Nordenskjöld Glacier. Here a Wasp helicopter airlifted in two Geminis, but one was found to have been damaged during transport. The remaining boat was used to ferry half of the unit across Cumberland Bay East, but the crossing was thwarted by strong headwinds and accumulating drift ice from the nearby glacier. With the weather deteriorating, the mission was called off, but the SBS had to wait another day to be evacuated.

On 22 April, Young's Task Force was joined by the tanker RFA Brambleleaf, which had travelled past the Cape of Good Hope and originally arrived in the TEZ on 19 April, meeting HMS Endurance, before leaving again to wait to rendezvous with the other ships in the Task Force. The tanker had suffered heavy damage in a severe storm, and it was decided to transfer as much fuel as possible onto Tidespring, under cover of Plymouth, before she could begin her journey back to the UK for repairs. The long process began on the same day, but was momentarily interrupted when the three ships were spotted by an Argentine C-130 flying a maritime reconnaissance mission. The fuel transfer from Brambleleaf to Tidespring ended prematurely due to the suspected presence of Argentine submarine Santa Fe in the area.

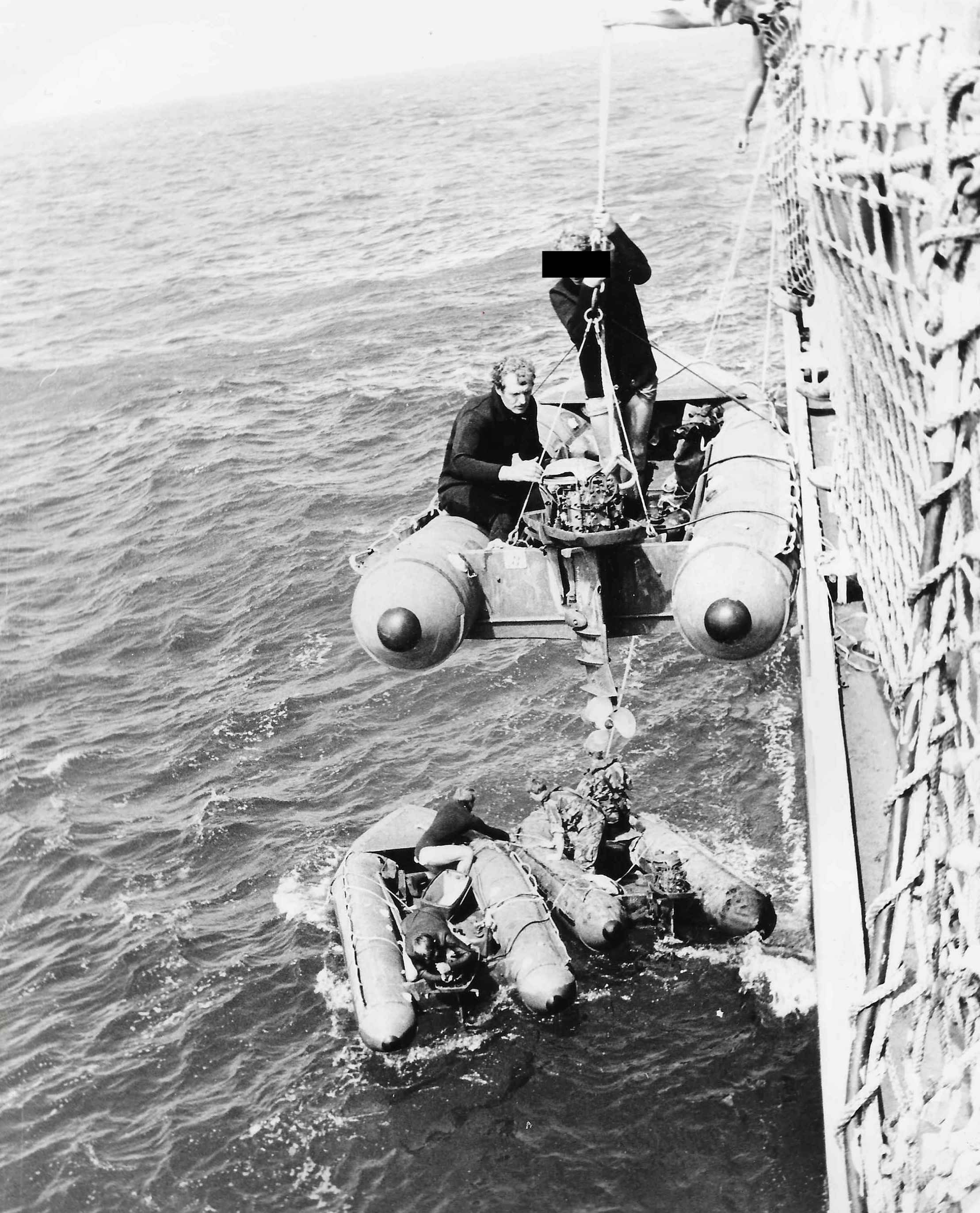
The Gemini boats

Despite earlier setbacks, Young remained committed to completing his intelligence-gathering mission, and on the night of 22/23 April Antrim entered Stromness Bay in order to insert another SAS force. This time, Boat Troop, D squadron, led by Captain Tim Burls, were to be inserted in five Gemini boats. The attempt almost ended in disaster when two boats' engines refused to start and they were swept out to sea by an unexpected gale. One boat was rescued the following morning by Antrim's Wessex, while the other managed to restart their engine and reach the shore on the Busen Peninsula. After towing another boat to shore, Tommy Turtle went back to search for the others. The three remaining Geminis reached their intended objective on Grass Island, where an observation post was set up, after the men of 17 Troop had scaled a cliff in freezing conditions. They reported no Argentine activity in the Stromness area and signalled an SOS to HMS Endurance, which the next day was able to airlift them out by her Westland Wasp. After this operation, 17 Troop took to calling itself "The South Georgia Boating Club".

== Attack on Santa Fe ==
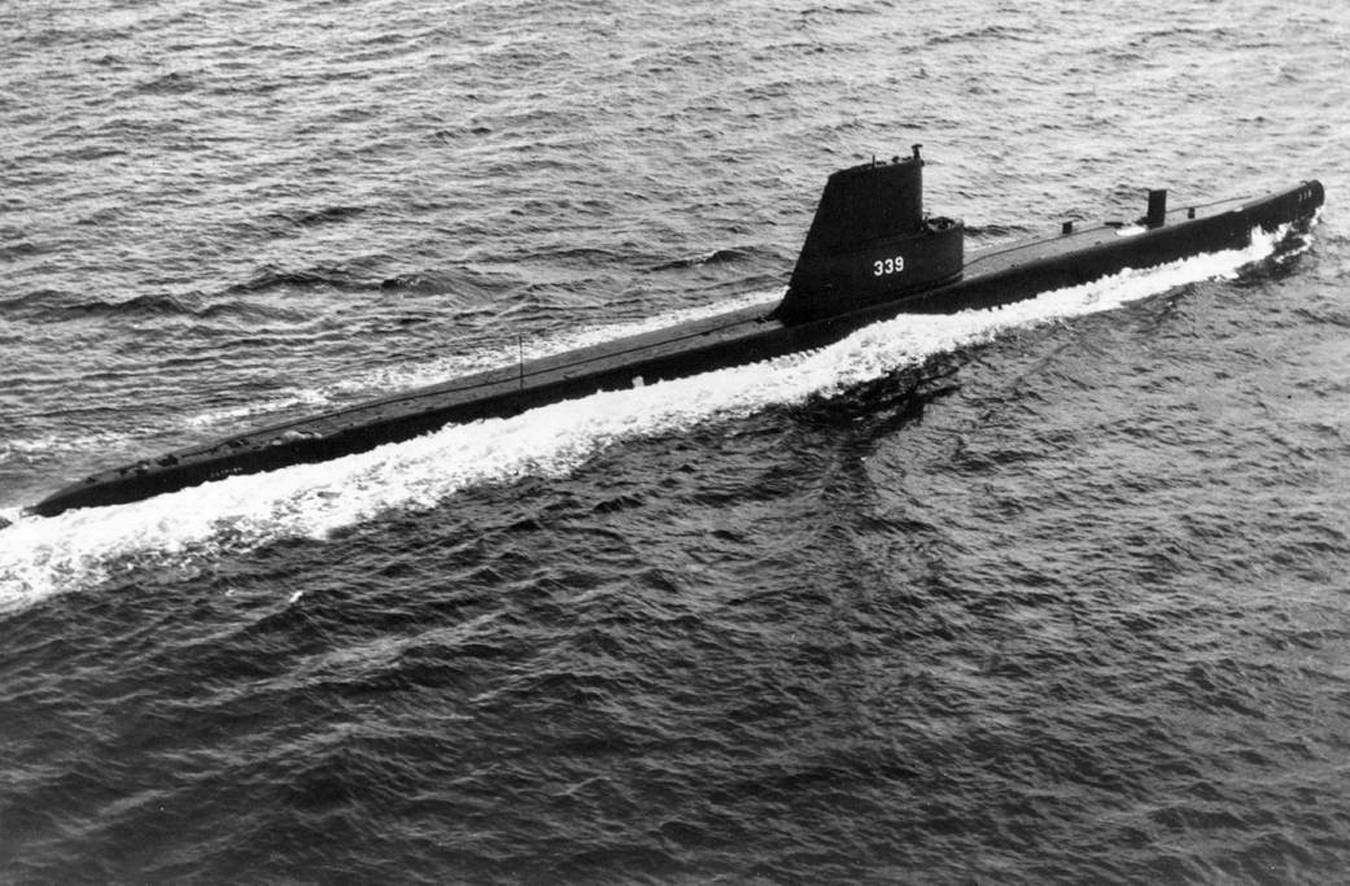
The Argentine submarine ARA Santa Fe while still in US Navy service as the USS Catfish

On 23 April, the British learned through radio intercepts that an Argentinian submarine was approaching South Georgia. This was the GUPPY II–converted Balao class ARA Santa Fe, the former USS Catfish, part of Argentina's submarine fleet of four boats. On 9 April Santa Fe, commanded by Corvette Captain Horacio Bicain, left Mar del Plata with eleven technicians to restore utility services on New Georgia and nine marines with Bantam anti-tank missiles to reinforce the original invading force, which was armed only with rifles and machine guns. The mission was launched by Vice-Admiral Juan Lombardo, following a request for reinforcements by Captain Trombetta shortly after the Argentine invasion of South Georgia.

This contradicted the military junta's orders to not reinforce South Georgia, but when Admiral Jorge Anaya, Commander-in-Chief of the Argentine Navy, learned of the mission, he refused to disavow his subordinates and authorised it. Storm conditions prevented use of the snorkel, which placed unexpected demands on the batteries and required remaining surfaced during part of the approach. Her sensors were unreliable, and the charge capacity of her aged batteries was much reduced from their original design. While undertaking her transport mission, Santa Fe's orders were to remain undetected, not to attack any ships and to break contact with any ship which might detect her.

The arrival of the submarine posed a significant threat to the British Task Force, and Young was ordered to disperse his ships, except Endurance, outside the South Georgia total exclusion zone. The frigate HMS Brilliant, commanded by Captain John Coward, was diverted to South Georgia with her two Lynx helicopters to replace the aircraft lost on Fortuna Glacier, but she was not due to arrive until the morning of 25 April. Conqueror was assigned a new patrol area 70 miles to the west of South Georgia, but a failure in her communications mast meant that she did not receive the order until 24 April, by which time Santa Fe was already approaching the island.

The Argentinian submarine successfully landed her reinforcements at Grytviken, under moonless cloud cover in the pre-dawn hours of 25 April, and was underway by 05:00. Antrim′s aircrew, which included Lieutenant Chris Parry, anticipated that Santa Fe would unload her troops under the cover of darkness and would withdraw at first light through Cumberland Bay without submerging, due to the threat of icebergs. They suggested re-fitting their Wessex with radar, which had been removed to transport the SAS, and intercept Santa Fe as she left the bay. Captain Young thus brought his three warships some 25 miles north-east of Cumberland Bay and prepared his helicopter force for anti-submarine action. He now had at his disposal, besides Antrim's Wessex, three Wasps (one aboard Plymouth and two on Endurance) and two Lynxes (aboard Brilliant). At 08:55, the submarine was located by Antrim's Wessex using radar and engaged with depth charges. One charge bounced off the boat's deck, both exploded under and alongside, rupturing the port ballast tank and piercing an external fuel tank. Now unable to dive, Bicain was forced to reverse course towards Grytviken.

The Wessex was then joined by a Lynx which launched a Mark 46 torpedo, but the weapon was configured to home on submerged submarines and passed harmlessly underneath its target. Endurance and Plymouth then dispatched Westland Wasp helicopters armed with AS-12 missiles. Endurance’s proximity allowed repeated attacks, where as Plymouth’s Wasp could only make one attack.

Attacks on ARA Santa Fe, 25 April 1982
Aircraft	Launched from	Action	Time	Result
Wessex (XP142)	Antrim	Detected the Santa Fe by radar, confirmed visually and Dropped two Mk.11 depth charges.	04:55	Explosions on the port side, badly damaging the submarine.
Lynx (XZ725)	Brilliant	Dropped a Mk.46 torpedo and engaged with 7.62 mm machine-gun.	05:05	Torpedo passed under the boat, Machine-gun hits on the sail.
Wasp (XS527)	Endurance	Three separate attacks, firing a total of five AS-12 missiles, with one launch failure.	05:10 onwards	First attack: one missile struck the sail, damaging periscopes, the other fell short by 30 m. Second attack: one missile missed, the other pierced the stern fin and exploded in the sea. Third attack: one missile failed to launch, the other struck the sail, destroying sensors, antennas and periscopes.
Wasp (XS539)	Endurance	Two AS-12 missiles.	05:10 onwards	First missile missed by 50 m. Second hit but failed to detonate.
Wasp (XT429)	Plymouth	One AS-12 missile.	05:10 onwards	Missile fell short.
Lynx (XZ729)	Brilliant	Engaged with 7.62 mm machine-gun.	05:30	Machine-gun hits on the sail.

As Santa Fe neared Grytviken, Argentine troops at King Edward Point responded with rifles and at least one anti-tank rocket. The submarine’s crew attempted to defend themselves with small arms, but failed to halt the assault. Nine AS-12 missiles were launched in total, four hit, four missed, and one failed to launch. Two of the hits passed straight through the sail before detonating beyond it, one caused minor damage by destroying the periscopes, and wounding a crewman.

Wessex’s depth-charge tore the engine from its mountings, bent the propeller shaft and ruptured the fuel tank, compromising the ballast system and preventing the submarine from submerging, making Santa Fe a constructive total loss and the only submarine destroyed by helicopters. By 11:00, she had returned to the Grytviken pier and was abandoned by her crew.

== Execution ==
With Santa Fe disabled, Major Sheridan judged that the Argentines would be demoralised and that an attack should be made immediately. However, his main force, M Company, 42 Commando, Royal Marines, was still onboard Tidespring, 200 miles away. A scratch force was put together with various forces on board Antrim. These included M company's command element and mortar troop, 2 SAS troops and the 2 SBS command and signal elements, for a total of 79 men.

There followed a helicopter assault by the improvised group of Special Forces and Royal Marines, with two Royal Navy vessels (Antrim and Plymouth) conducting a naval bombardment demonstration on the low hills opposite Grytviken. The garrison at Grytviken and the crew of the disabled Santa Fe surrendered to elements of M Company after 15 minutes at 17.15 GMT. The garrison at Leith Harbour, under the command of Lieutenant Commander Alfredo Astiz, surrendered the following day.

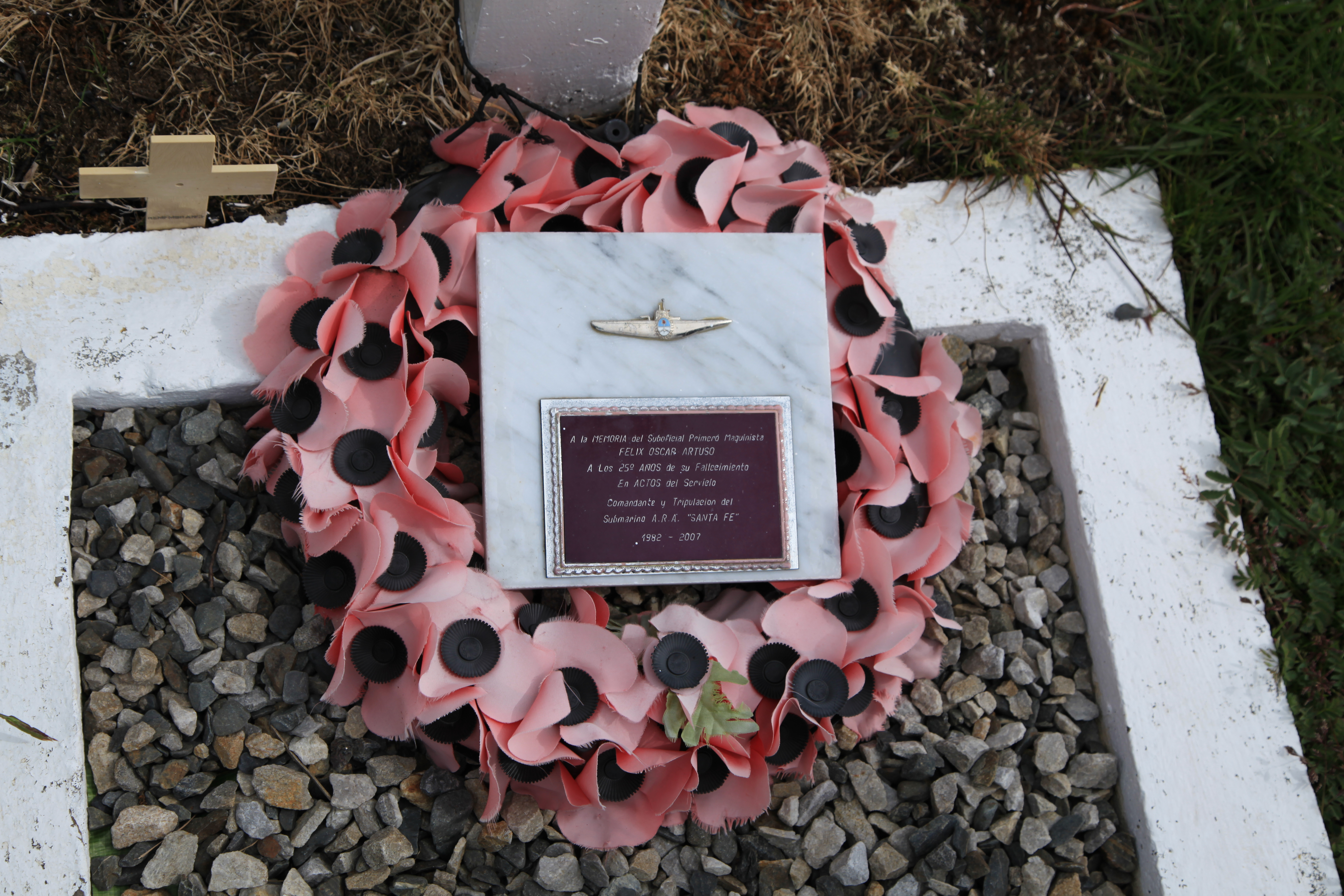
The grave of Petty Officer Artuso in South Georgia

An Argentine prisoner of war, Navy Petty Officer Felix Artuso, a crewman of Santa Fe, was mistakenly shot dead on 26 April after a British marine thought he was sabotaging the submarine. He is buried at Grytviken Cemetery.

A message that was widely publicised in the UK was made by the Task Group Commander, Captain Brian Young, after the surrender at Grytviken:

Be pleased to inform Her Majesty that the White Ensign flies alongside the Union Jack in South Georgia. God save the Queen.

After Secretary of State for Defence John Nott read this statement to journalists in Downing Street, prime minister Margaret Thatcher told the crowd to "rejoice".

Wildlife film-maker Cindy Buxton and her assistant Annie Price who had been filming at Elsehul Bay, on the far north-west coast of South Georgia, when Argentine forces occupied the island, were cut off for around four weeks. They were rescued on 30 April by a helicopter from HMS Endurance, whose crew had earlier provided them with a pistol and basic instruction in its use.
