= RB 53 =

RB 53 is the designation of several regional rail services in Germany:

- RB 53, operated by Bayerische Regiobahn between Traunstein and Ruhpolding
- RB 53, operated by DB Regio Baden-Württemberg between Albstadt-Ebingen and Aulendorf
- RB 53, operated by DB Regio Bayern between Schlüchtern and Bamberg
- RB 53, operated by DB Regio Mitte between Neustadt and Wissembourg
- RB 53, operated by DB Regio NRW between Dortmund and Iserlohn
- RB 53, operated by DB Regio Südost between Bad Langensalza and Gotha

As well as the Swedish Bantam (missile) anti-tank guided missile with the designation Rb 53.
