= Brian Young (Royal Navy officer) =

Royal Navy Captain and Fleet Air Arm pilot (1930–2009)

Captain Brian Young DSO
- Born: 25 September 1930; Blean, Kent
- Died: 24 December 2009 (aged 79)
- Military career
- Allegiance: United Kingdom
- Branch: Royal Navy
- Rank: Captain
- Commands: 892 Squadron; 766 Squadron; HMS Wiston; 9th Mine Counter Measure Squadron; HMS Danae; HMS Antrim
- Conflicts: Falklands War: Operation Paraquet
- Awards: Distinguished Service Order; Naval General Service Medal; General Service Medal; South Atlantic Medal

Captain Brian Gilmore Young, DSO (25 September 1930 – 24 December 2009) was a British Royal Navy officer, naval aviator and Falklands War veteran.

== Naval career ==
He joined the Royal Navy in 1944 as a cadet, first at Eaton Hall, Chester, then at Dartmouth. He served as a midshipman and sub-lieutenant in the battleship King George V, the light carrier Theseus and the sloop Wren.

Young learned to fly in the United States, serving from 1954 to 1958 with 803 and 804 Naval Air Squadrons, flying Hawker Sea Hawk jet fighters from the carriers Albion, Centaur, Bulwark and Ark Royal, and participating in ground attacks in Egypt during the Suez War.

== Falklands War ==
Young was captain of the destroyer Antrim and commander of the ships detached to recover South Georgia, known as Operation Paraquet.
