= David Pentreath =

Officer in the Royal Navy (1933–2019)

Captain David Pentreath CBE, DSO (1933–26 June 2019) was an officer and pilot in the Royal Navy. His commands included HMS Daring, HMS Brighton, HMS Plymouth and HMNB Clyde. He fought in the Falklands War while commanding HMS Plymouth and took the surrender of Argentine forces on South Georgia in 1982.
