= HMS Plymouth (F126) =

1961 Type 12M or Rothesay-class frigate of the Royal Navy

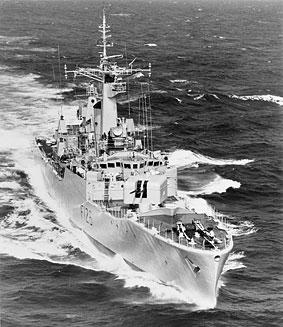
- HMS Plymouth underway

History

United Kingdom
- Name: HMS Plymouth
- Builder: Devonport Dockyard
- Laid down: 1 July 1958
- Launched: 20 July 1959
- Commissioned: 11 May 1961
- Decommissioned: 28 April 1988
- Identification: Pennant number: F126
- Fate: Museum ship from 28 April 1988, Scrapped October 2014

General characteristics
- Class & type: Rothesay-class frigate
- Displacement: 2,150 tons standard; 2,560 tons full load
- Length: 370 ft (110 m)
- Beam: 41 ft (12 m)
- Draught: 17.3 ft (5.3 m)
- Installed power: 30,000 shp (22,000 kW)
- Propulsion: Y-100 plant; Two Babcock & Wilcox boilers; Two English Electric steam turbines; Two shafts
- Speed: 30 knots (56 km/h)
- Range: 400 tons oil fuel, 5,200 nautical miles (9,600 km) at 12 knots (22 km/h)
- Complement: 152, later 225, modified to 235
- Sensors & processing systems: Electronics (as built): Radar Type 293Q target indication; Radar Type 277Q height finding; Radar Type 275 fire control on director Mark 6M; Radar Type 974 navigation; Type 1010 Cossor Mark 10 IFF; Sonar Type 174 search; Sonar Type 162 target classification; Sonar Type 170 attack; Electronics (as modified): Radar Type 993 target indication; Radar Type 903 fire control on director MRS3; Radar Type 978 navigation; Type 1010 Cossor Mark 10 IFF; Sonar Type 177 search; Sonar Type 162 target classification; Sonar Type 170 attack
- Armament: Armament (as built): 1 × twin 4.5in gun Mark 6; 1 × 40 mm Bofors gun Mark 7; 2 × Limbo A/S mortar Mark 10; 12 × 21-in A/S torpedo tubes (removed or never shipped); Armament (as modified): 1 × twin 4.5in gun Mark 6; 1 × Sea Cat GWS-20 SAM; 2 × 20 mm Oerlikon guns; 1 × Limbo A/S mortar Mark 10; 2 × 8-barrel 3in Knebworth/Corvus countermeasures launchers
- Aircraft carried: Wasp helicopter

HMS Plymouth was a Royal Navy Type 12M, Rothesay-class frigate. In 1982, Plymouth was one of the first Royal Navy ships to arrive in the South Atlantic during the Falklands War.

== Background ==
Plymouth was one of 12 ships built in the new Rothesay class; were built after the Whitby (Type 12s) in the mid 1950s. Plymouth was built at the Devonport Dockyard, in her namesake city and was laid down on 1 July 1958. She was launched by Viscountess Astor on 20 July 1959 and commissioned on 11 May 1961 with the pennant number F126.

== Design ==
The Rothesay class was an improved version of the Whitby-class anti-submarine frigate, with nine Rothesays ordered in the 1954–55 shipbuilding programme for the Royal Navy to supplement the six Whitbys.

Plymouth was 370 feet 0 inches (112.78 m) long overall and 360 feet 0 inches (109.73 m) between perpendiculars, with a beam of 41 feet 0 inches (12.50 m) and a draught of 13 feet 6 inches (4.11 m). The Rothesays were powered by the same Y-100 machinery used by the Whitby-class. Two Babcock & Wilcox water-tube boilers fed steam at 550 pounds per square inch (3,800 kPa) and 850 °F (454 °C) to two sets of geared steam turbines which drove two propeller shafts, fitted with large (12 feet (3.7 m) diameter) propellers. The machinery was rated at 30,000 shaft horsepower (22,000 kW), giving a speed of 29.5 knots (33.9 mph; 54.6 km/h). Crew was about 212 officers and men. (Note: Conway's states the crew of a Rothesay ranged from 200–235, while Jane's Fighting Ships 1962–63 states a crew of 200 (9 officers and 191 ratings))

A twin 4.5-inch (113 mm) Mark 6 gun mount was fitted forward, with 350 rounds of ammunition carried. It was originally intended to fit a twin 40 mm L/70 Bofors anti-aircraft mount aft, but in 1957 it was decided to fit the Seacat anti-aircraft missile instead. Seacat was not yet ready, and Plymouth was completed with a single L/60 40 mm Bofors mount aft as a temporary anti-aircraft armament. The design anti-submarine armament consisted of twelve 21-inch torpedo-tubes (eight fixed and two twin rotating mounts) for Mark 20E Bidder homing anti-submarine torpedoes, backed up by two Limbo anti-submarine mortars fitted aft. The Bidder homing torpedoes proved unsuccessful however, being too slow to catch modern submarines, and the torpedo tubes were soon removed.

The ship was fitted with a Type 293Q surface/air search radar on the foremast, with a Type 277 height-finding radar on a short mast forward of the foremast. A Mark 6M fire control system (including a Type 275 radar) for the 4.5 inch guns was mounted above the ship's bridge, while a Type 974 navigation radar was also fitted. The ship's sonar fit consisted of Type 174 search, Type 170 fire control sonar for Limbo and a Type 162 sonar for classifying targets on the sea floor.

=== Modernisation ===
From 1966 to 1969 Plymouth underwent a major modernisation, which brought the ship close in capacity to the Leander class. A hangar and flight deck was added aft to allow a Westland Wasp helicopter to be operated, at the expense of one of the Limbo anti-submarine mortars, while a Seacat launcher and the associated GWS20 director was mounted on the hangar roof. Two 20-mm cannons were added either side of the ship's bridge. A MRS3 fire control system replaced the Mark 6M, and its integral Type 903 radar allowed the Type 277 height finder radar to be removed. A Type 993 surface/air-search radar replaced the existing Type 293Q radar, while the ship's defences were enhanced by the addition of the Corvus chaff rocket dispenser.

== Operational history ==
=== 1959–1981 ===
Plymouth served between 1963 and 1964 as the leader of the 22nd Escort Squadron and leader of the 29th Escort Squadron from 1964 to 1966 in Singapore and Australia.

In 1966 under the command of Captain Thomas Fanshawe Plymouth was assigned to the Beira Patrol. On 4 April she intercepted the oil tanker Joanna V, but declined the use of force for diplomatic reasons she failed to prevent the ship from reaching Beira, raising concerns that its 18,700 tons of petroleum could then be sent by pipeline to the rebel British colony of Rhodesia.

In 1970 Plymouth took part in the Cook Bicentennial celebrations held in Sydney Harbour. After a spell inside a floating dock in Singapore, to clean and repaint her hull, the ship sailed across the Indian Ocean for a six-week stint on the Beira Patrol.

Back in the UK, Plymouth visited various ports around the country including Stornoway and Middlesbrough as part of a Royal Navy recruitment drive.

In 1977 the ship – as part of the 8th Frigate Squadron – attended the fleet review off Spithead for the Queen's Silver Jubilee. She saw action in the Cod Wars between the United Kingdom and Iceland and also the Falklands War in 1982.

=== Falklands War ===
Plymouth, then commanded by Captain David Pentreath, was one of the first Royal Navy ships to arrive in the South Atlantic following the Argentine invasion of the Falkland Islands and South Georgia. Together with Antrim, Brilliant and Endurance, she took part in the recapture of South Georgia during Operation Paraquet. On 25 April, her Wasp helicopter took part in an attack on the Argentinian submarine Santa Fe, which had previously been badly damaged by a depth charge attack from Antrim′s Wessex, claiming one hit on the waterline with an AS12 missile. After the crippled Santa Fe had sailed back into Grytviken harbour and was abandoned by her crew, a scratch force of Royal Marines, SAS and SBS troops was landed to capture the settlement. Along with Antrim, Plymouth provided naval gunfire support for this force, both ships firing a total of 235 shells, until the Argentinian troops raised the white flag. Later that day Plymouth sailed with Endurance to Leith Harbour, which was still held by the Argentines. The next day the garrison commander, Lieutenant commander Alfredo Astiz, signed the surrender in Plymouth's wardroom.

On 1 May, Plymouth rejoined the task force and on the night of 20–21 May, she was part of the escort for the amphibious assault force entering San Carlos Water, being the first British vessel to sail into the bay. On 21 May the Argentine Air Force began a series of air attacks against the landing force. Plymouth provided assistance to the frigate Argonaut, the first ship to suffer damage in "Bomb Alley". For the next nine days she carried out air defense duties by day while by night undertaking escort and patrol missions and supporting ground troops with her 4.5-inch (114 mm) guns. She was then dispatched to the carrier battle group, located some 150 miles east of the Falklands. On 30 May, the group came under attack by Exocet missile but no damage was incurred and on 1 June Plymouth returned to San Carlos Water.

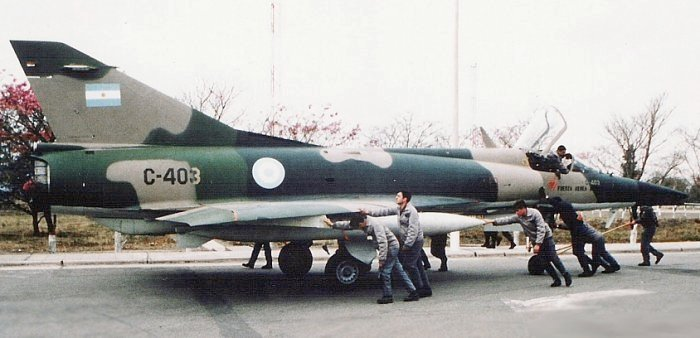
An FAA Dagger.

On 8 June, the ship was alone in Falkland Sound, returning from a naval gunfire mission, when she was attacked by five Dagger fighter-bombers of Grupo 6 of the Argentine Air Force. Despite Plymouth firing her 20 mm guns and a Seacat missile, the aircraft dropped eight Mk 82 500 lb bombs, five of which struck home. One Dagger was unable to release its payload due to a mechanical failure and another suffered light damage from shrapnel. According to other sources Plymouth was hit by four 1000 lb bombs. All of the bombs failed to explode, but caused extensive damage: one hit the flight deck, detonating a depth charge and starting a fire, one went straight through her funnel and two more destroyed her Limbo anti-submarine mortar. Internal flooding caused the ship to take a six degree list. Five men were injured in the attack. The fire took 90 minutes to extinguish with assistance from Avenger, and repairs were carried out through the night and the next day, restoring some of her capabilities. Plymouth then withdrew to a repair area, where naval personnel on board the oil rig support vessel MV Stena Seaspread assisted in returning her to fighting order. She returned to shore bombardment duties on 14 June, when Argentine forces in the Falklands finally surrendered.

After hostilities had ended Plymouth was the first British warship to enter Port Stanley harbour on 17 June. After assisting in establishing naval control of the harbour she returned briefly to San Carlos before leaving the south Atlantic on 21 June in company with Glamorgan. She returned to Rosyth Dockyard on 14 July for a full repair and a refit. During the course of the war she fired 909 4.5 inch shells and nine Seacat missiles.

=== 1983–1987 ===
In 1983, Plymouth served as the West Indies guard ship. On 11 April 1984, she was involved in a collision with the German Köln-class frigate Braunschweig in fog off Bornholm during exercises in the Baltic. Plymouth's bow was damaged, and she had to put into Karlskrona, Sweden for temporary repairs. In 1986 she suffered a boiler room fire, killing two sailors.

== Preservation ==
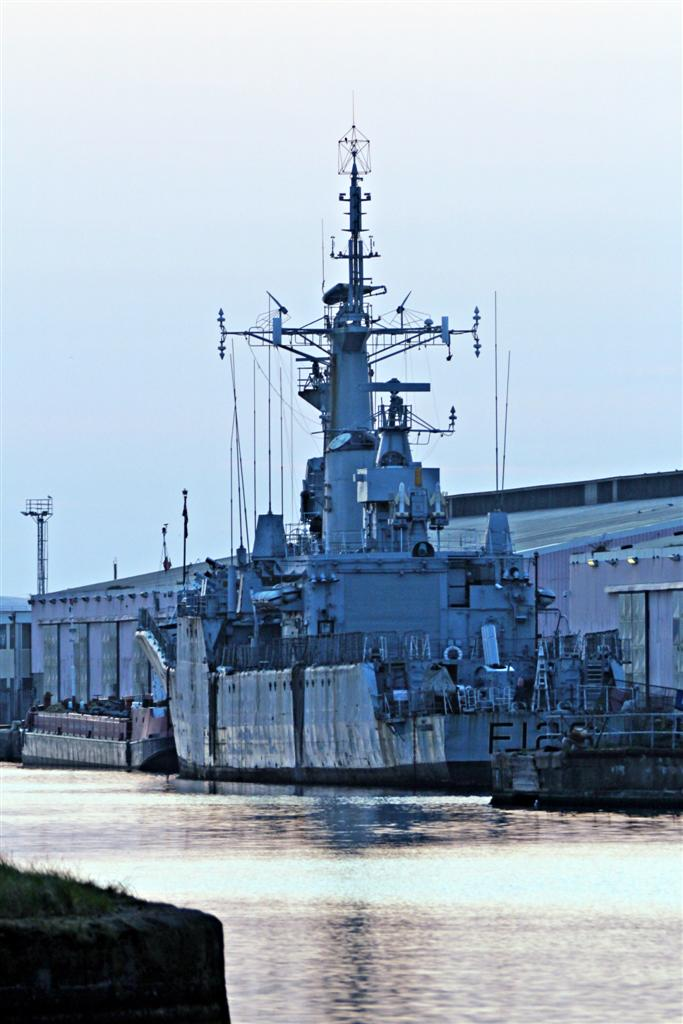
Plymouth at Birkenhead docks in 2012.

After the ship, which was the last Type 12 in service, was paid off on 28 April 1988, she was acquired by the Warship Preservation Trust. In 1990 she was towed to Glasgow and placed on permanent display at a berth on the River Clyde. In the late 1990s, she was relocated to the Great Float within Birkenhead Docks for display alongside other preserved ships and submarines, where she became the undertaking of Peel Holdings.

== Scrapping controversy ==
On 6 February 2006 the Warship Preservation Trust closed citing financial difficulties. Plymouth became the property of the Mersey Docks and Harbour Company following the demise of the trust. Plymouth City Council expressed an interest in the ship; a campaign group called the HMS Plymouth Preservation Trust attempted to raise £250,000 to bring the warship back to her home city. However the attempt to bring the Type 12 frigate back to Plymouth's Millbay Docks failed after the Associated British Ports withdrew the offer of a berth in January 2007. An online petition then called on the UK government to provide a berth for the ship, but it was announced in 2012 that she had been sold for scrapping.

In January 2014 campaigners continued to dispute Peel Ports – which owns Mersey Docks – that it had ownership rights to Plymouth. The action group accused Peel of allowing the condition of Plymouth to worsen in order to make any attempt to move/preserve her appear unfeasible.

The ship was towed from Vittoria Dock, Birkenhead, by the tug Amber II, on 20 August 2014 to be scrapped in Turkey. HMS Plymouth was scrapped at Aliağa in 2014.

There appears to be some controversy about how the sale was conducted by the Peel Group and some of the clauses included in the sale contract with the dismantlers.
