= Fortuna Glacier =

Glacier on South Georgia island

- Glaciar Fortuna
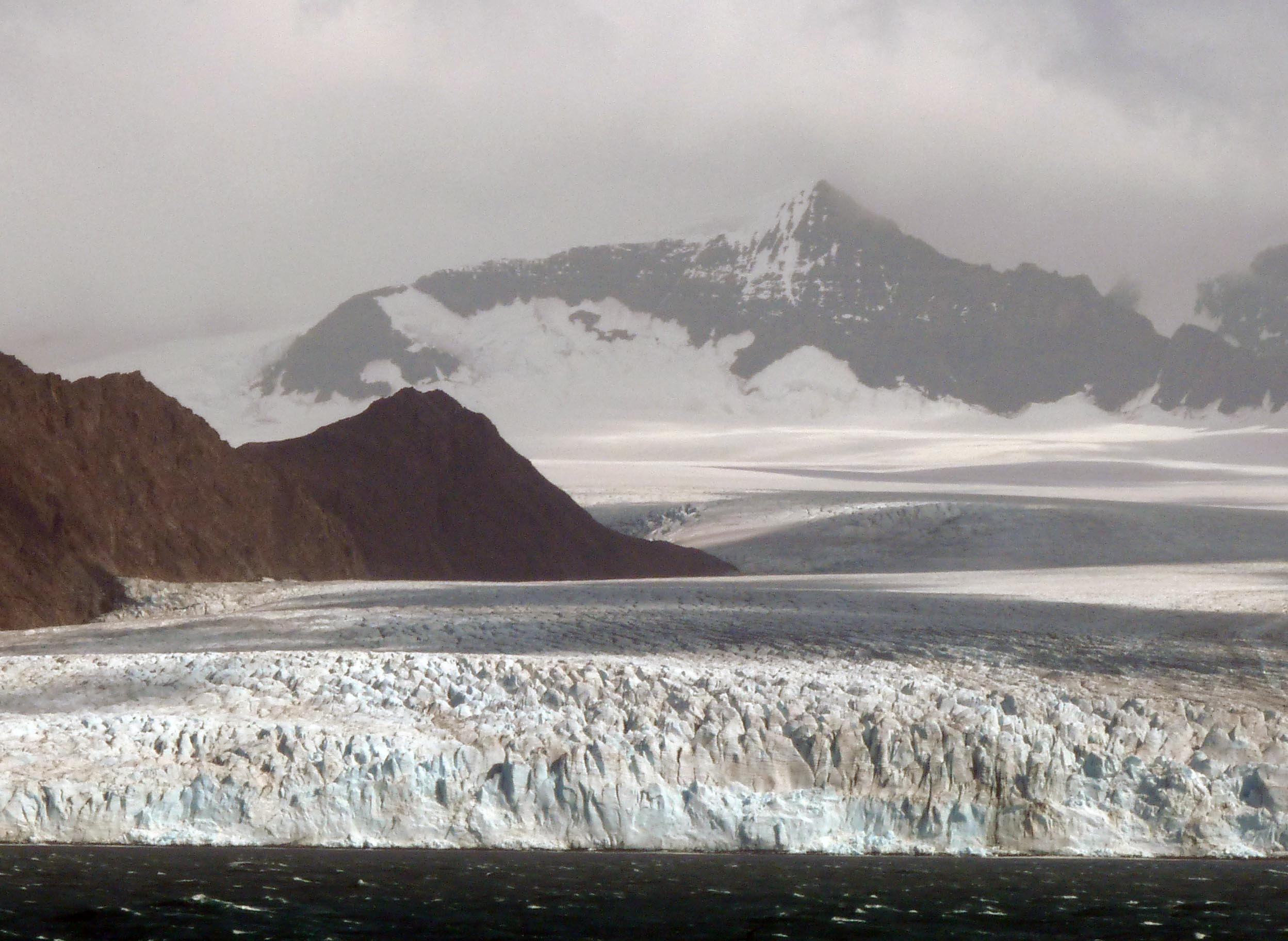
- Fortuna Glacier

- Location within South Georgia Island
- Location: South Georgia
- Coordinates: 54°6′S 36°51′W
- Thickness: unknown
- Terminus: Fortuna Bay
- Status: unknown

Fortuna Glacier is a tidewater glacier at the mouth of Cumberland Bay on the island of South Georgia. It flows in a northeast direction to its terminus just west of Cape Best, with an eastern distributary almost reaching the west side of Fortuna Bay, on the north coast of South Georgia. It was named in about 1912, presumably after the whale catcher Fortuna, and is notable for two major events in the 20th century.

== 1916 ==
In mid-April 1915, explorer Ernest Shackleton's ship Endurance, carrying the 27 members of his Antarctic expedition, became locked in the polar ice in the Weddell Sea just off Antarctica. In the spring of 1916, as the ice warmed and drifted north, the ship was crushed. The party used the lifeboats to get to Elephant Island, a desolate, uninhabited island at the edge of the Antarctic Peninsula. There they were stranded. Shackleton and five others crammed into a lifeboat, the James Caird, sailed across the Scotia Sea for 800 miles (1,300 km), reaching South Georgia two weeks later. They landed on the island's uninhabited west side at King Haakon Bay. Poor weather prevented them from setting sail again to one of the whaling stations on the island's east side, which were the only human habitation on South Georgia. Instead they had to cross the largely unknown interior of the island. Shackleton beached his boat and with two others made his traverse of the island, crossing the Fortuna Glacier in the process. Thirty-six hours later they reached Stromness whaling station.

== 1982 ==
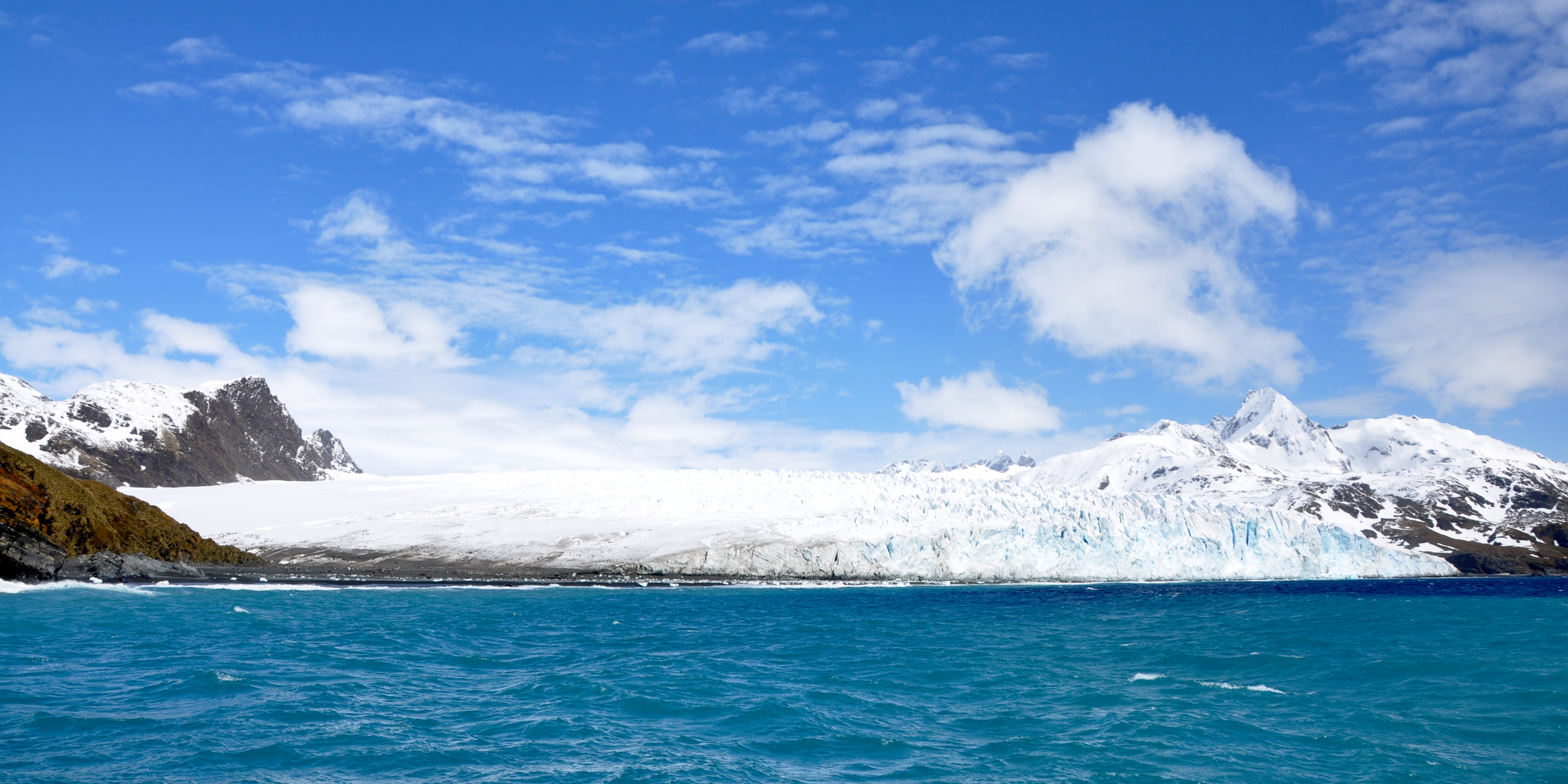
Fortuna Glacier in November 2009

When Argentina militarily occupied the Falkland Islands and South Georgia, the British Armed Forces recaptured the island in 'Operation Paraquet', thereby removing the Argentinian military presence and restoring the island to British sovereignty. Commanders decided to land a mountain troop of Special Air Service and 42 Royal Marine Commandos on the glacier, to approach Grytviken from the most unlikely direction. After the troops were landed on the glacier in conditions of extremely poor visibility and gale force winds on 21 April, conditions deteriorated still further. During several rescue attempts the following day by a Wessex HAS.3 (off of HMS Antrim) and two Wessex HU.5 helicopters (off of HMS Tidespring), the two Wessex HU.5s crashed in extreme weather conditions. The Wessex HAS.3, crewed by Lt Cdr Ian Stanley, Lt Chris Parry, Sub Lt Stewart Cooper and PO ACMN David Fitzgerald, succeeded in rescuing all troops and aircrew just before dark in a noted feat of flying and navigation. On returning to Antrim, the Wessex HAS.3 (which can be seen at the Fleet Air Arm Museum at Yeovilton, Somerset) held 16 people instead of its normal complement of 4.

== See also ==
- List of glaciers in the Antarctic
- Glaciology
