= Rejoice (Margaret Thatcher) =

1982 remark by Margaret Thatcher

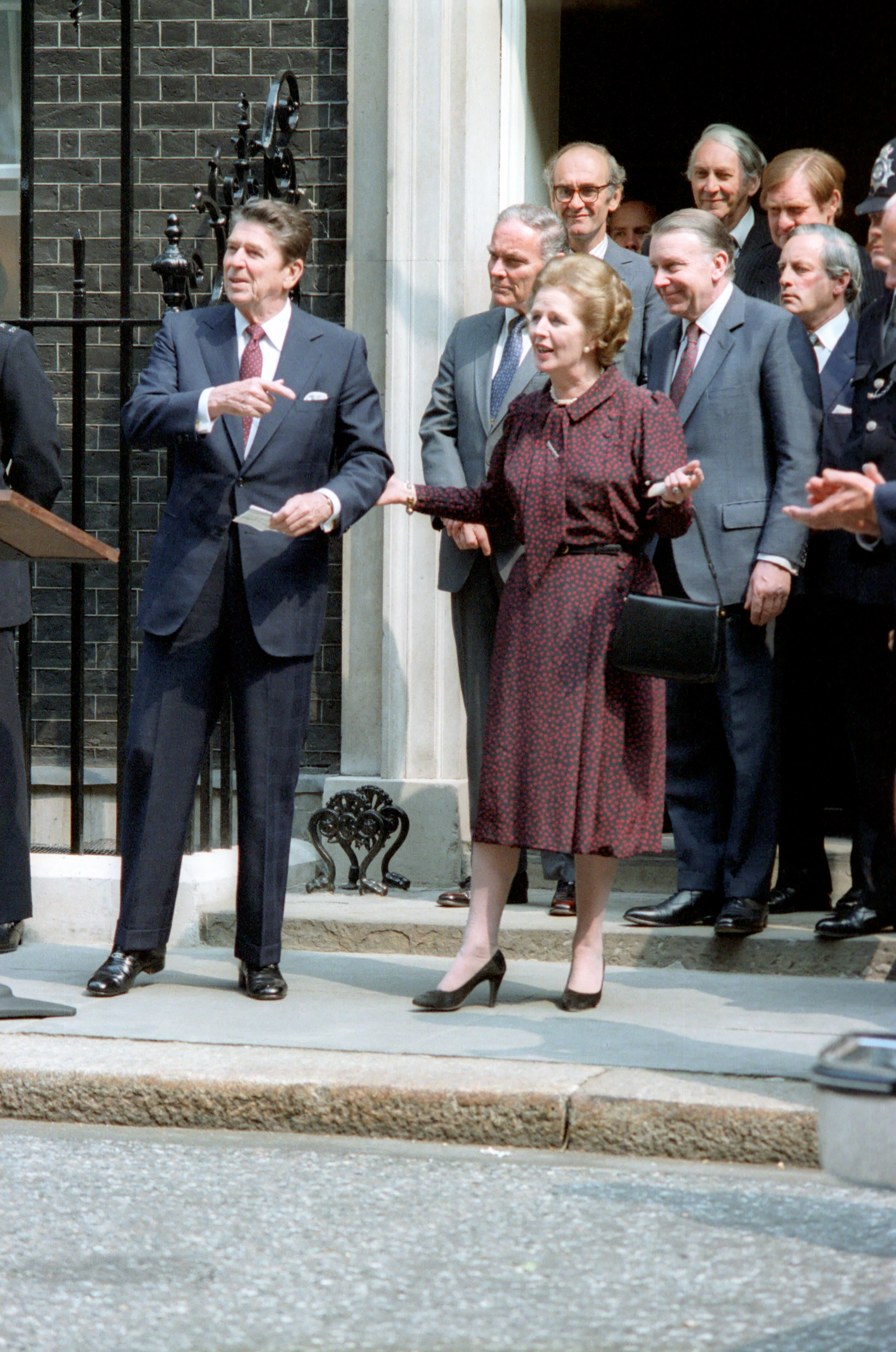
Thatcher on the steps of 10 Downing Street, with US president Ronald Reagan, in June 1982. John Nott is the man wearing glasses behind Thatcher.

"Rejoice" was a remark made by British prime minister Margaret Thatcher in Downing Street on 25 April 1982 following a statement read by Secretary of State for Defence John Nott on the successful recapture of South Georgia from Argentine forces, one of the first acts of the Falklands War. A journalist asked, "What happens next, Mr Nott?" at which point Thatcher intervened to state, "just rejoice at that news and congratulate our forces and the Marines", on which she and Nott headed back towards 10 Downing Street. As she reached the doorstep, Thatcher reiterated "rejoice" before entering the building. The words were controversial, with Thatcher's critics regarding them as jingoistic and triumphal, particularly regarding a military operation in which lives may have been lost. Thatcher's supporters regarded the words as a statement of support for British forces and a mark of the relief felt by Thatcher after a successful military operation. The phrase, often paraphrased as "rejoice, rejoice", has been used since in speech and art. Former prime minister Edward Heath uttered the words on Thatcher's resignation in 1990. Labour prime minister Tony Blair received dissent from his backbenchers (including cries of "Thatcher!") in 2004 when, after the Iraq War, he asked the House of Commons "whatever mistakes have been made, rejoice that Iraq can have such a future".

== Background ==
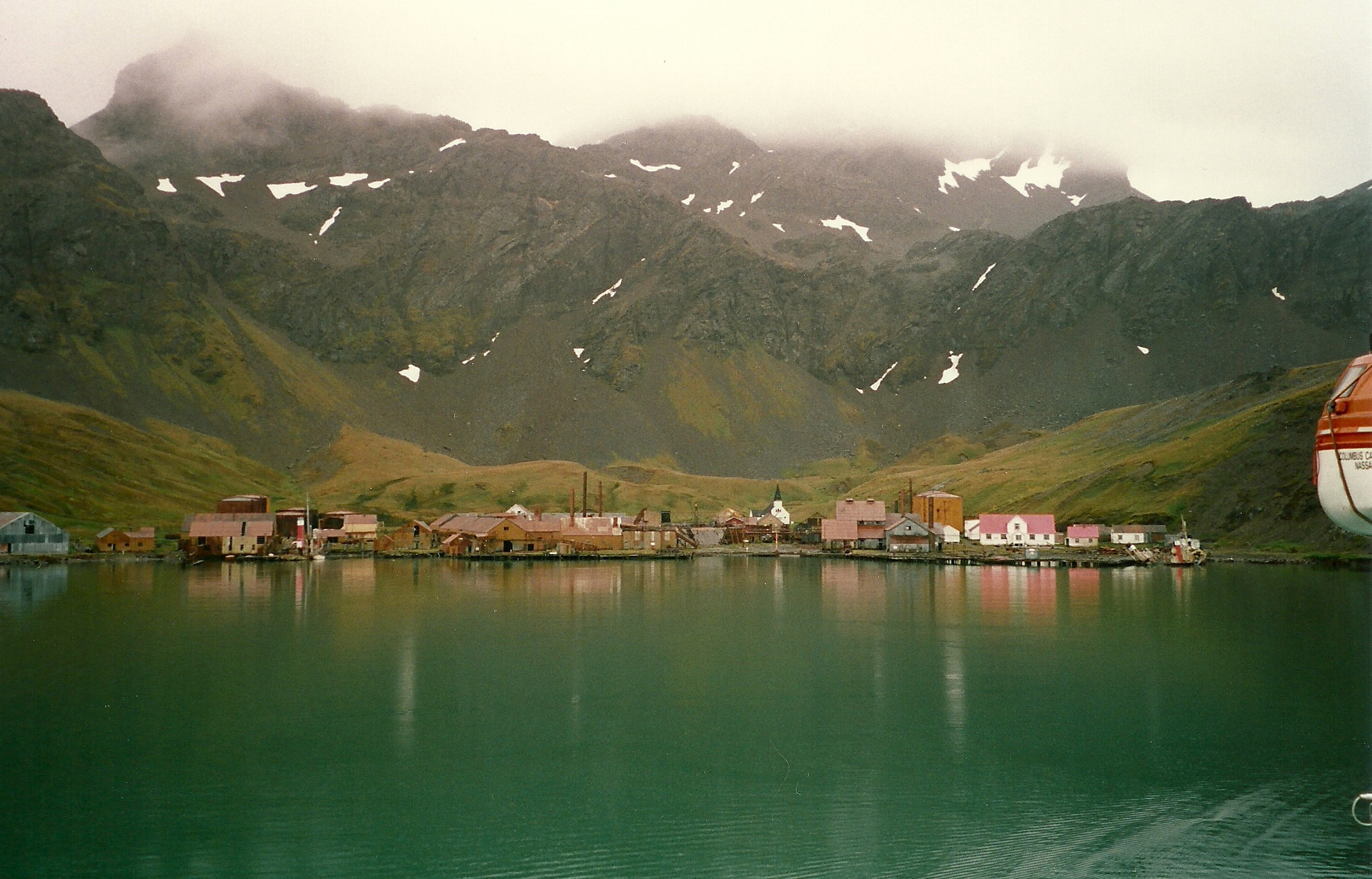
Grytviken, the largest whaling station on South Georgia (pictured in 1993)

On 2 April 1982, Argentina invaded the British dependency of the Falkland Islands, this was followed, on 3 April, by an invasion of the island of South Georgia. The same day British prime minister Margaret Thatcher dispatched a naval task force on the 8,000 miles (13,000 km) trip to the islands to recapture them. Thatcher decided, in the face of strong reservation from the Royal Navy Commander in Chief of the Fleet Admiral Sir John Fieldhouse, to retake South Georgia, an operation codenamed Paraquet. Thatcher and other politicians believed this would be an easy victory that would bolster public support for the war and send a signal of intent to the Argentines. Initial moves to land British special forces units on 22 April had resulted in the loss of two helicopters to poor weather, and on learning the news, Thatcher wept for the possible loss of 17 men; they were later rescued by a third helicopter. On 25 April, a Royal Marine landing force successfully recaptured the islands, disabling an Argentine submarine and taking the garrison at Grytviken prisoner with no British casualties.

== Statement ==
External videos
- Remarks on the recapture of South Georgia
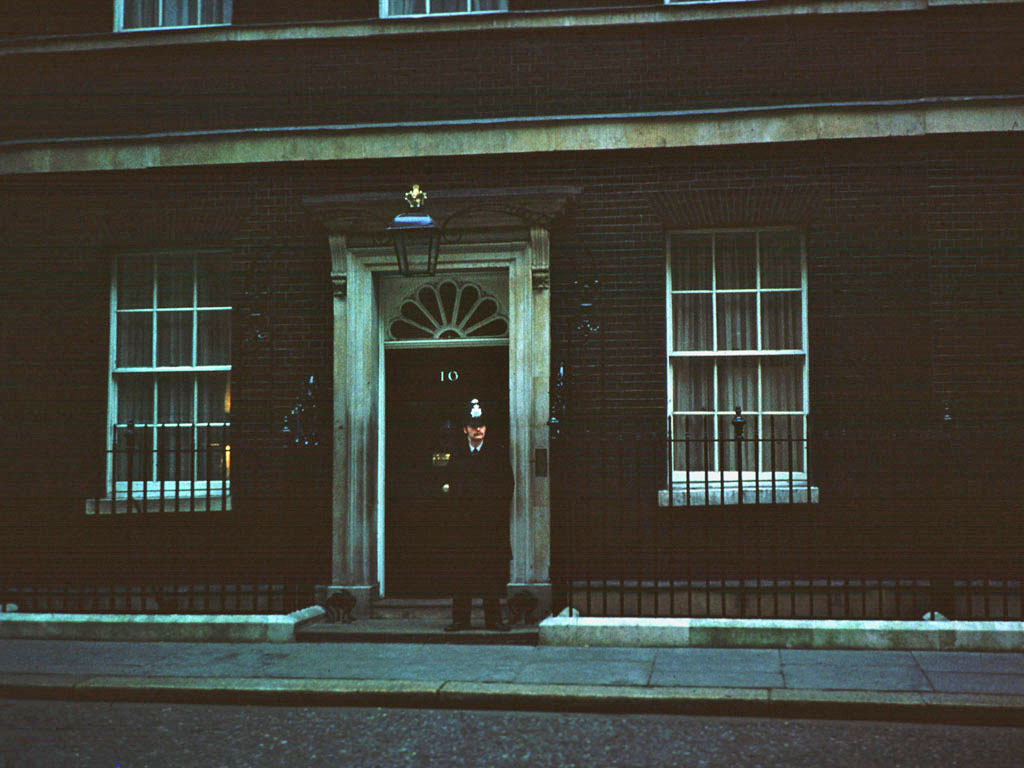
- 10 Downing Street (pictured in 1977)
- Statement outside No. 10 on YouTube

News of the victory was announced at a press briefing outside of 10 Downing Street on 25 April. Thatcher emerged from the front door, closely followed by her Secretary of State for Defence John Nott, in a manner that journalists Nicholas Wapshott and George Brock described as "towing Nott in her wake". Thatcher introduced Nott to the waiting press, stating that "The Secretary of State for Defence has just come over to give me some very good news and I think you'd like to have it at once". Nott then read out a pre-prepared statement that revealed that the landings had taken place on South Georgia at around 4 pm British Summer Time and that at about 6 pm the Argentine garrison had surrendered, after offering little resistance. He said that casualties for the Argentine side could not be confirmed but that none had been reported for the British forces. Nott concluded by reading the text of a signal sent by the commander of Operation Paraquet "Be pleased to inform Her Majesty that the White Ensign flies alongside the Union Jack in South Georgia. God save the Queen". Wapshott and Brock said that Nott "looked like an unhappy head prefect reading an announcement to school prayer".

On the conclusion of Nott's statement, Thatcher turned to move back to Downing Street. A member of the press then asked "What happens next, Mr Nott?", on which Nott stated "thank you very much" and began to walk away. Thatcher intervened to say, "Just rejoice at that news and congratulate our forces and the Marines", while simultaneously another journalist asks, "what is your reaction prime minister?". Thatcher and Nott, who had paused during her statement, then walked to the door to 10 Downing Street; Thatcher saying "goodnight gentlemen" as she did so. During this time a journalist asked "Are we going to declare war on Argentina, Mrs Thatcher?", on reaching the doorstep she reiterated: "rejoice". Thatcher's biographer and fellow Conservative Party member of Parliament, Jonathan Aitken, said that Thatcher rolled the R when she used the word "rejoice". Several video recordings were made of the entire exchange, and Nott's statement was broadcast live on BBC Radio.

== Impact and legacy ==
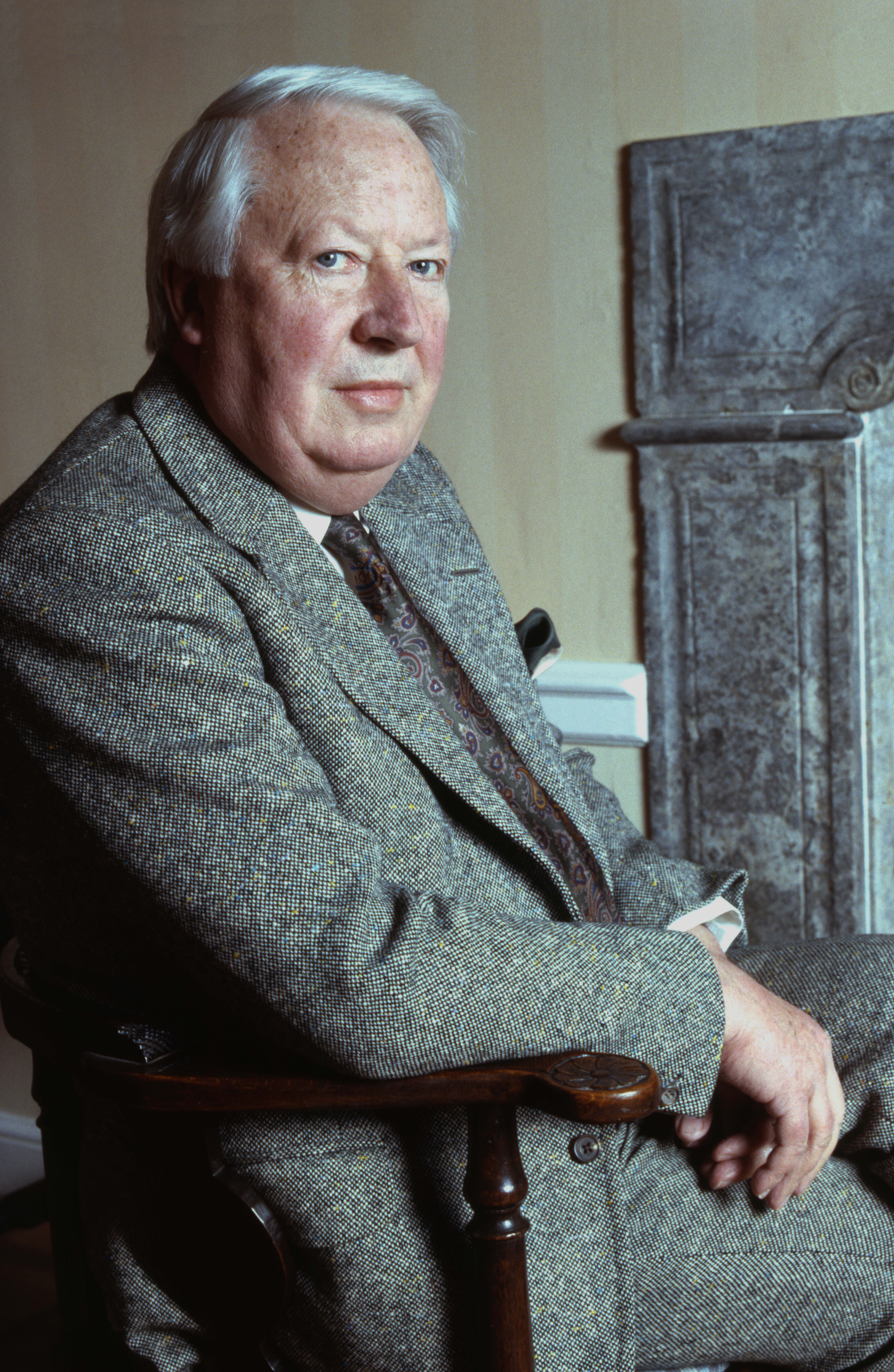
Thatcher's predecessor Edward Heath (pictured in 1987) would repeat the phrase on her resignation in 1990.

The statement to "rejoice", in context with a military operation, led to controversy and Nigel Andrews, writing in the Financial Times in 2007, called it one of the "most famous, or infamous, things that Margaret Thatcher ever said". He stated that the statement divided the British public into those who regarded it as a simple call to celebrate a British military victory and those who saw it as disrespectful of the potential loss of life and a sign of increasing fanaticism and jingoism in the Thatcher administration. Thatcher's opponents made frequent use of the statement, often paraphrased as "rejoice, rejoice". Labour Party politician Barbara Castle, writing in 1993, characterised the statement as an example of Thatcher's tendency to triumphalism, which she regarded as increasing at this time. She says that Thatcher may well have been rejoicing at her rise in the opinion polls, which rose from below 30% to above 40% during the war and led to Thatcher's landslide victory at the 1983 general election. Oliver Wilmott, writing in the New Statesman in 2010, regarded the words as an attempt by Thatcher to "[tap] in to a vein of national aspiration". Writer on leadership Phillip Abbot in 1997 regarded the statement as Churchillian and a mark of Thatcher's characterisation of the war as, in her words, a "struggle between good and evil" and Juliet and Wayne Thompson in 2004 considered the statement showed the appearance of "confident command" by Thatcher. Aitken states that the statement has been widely misconstrued; he believes that it was made as a rebuke to the reporters asking questions rather than an instruction to the British public. Journalist Simon Jenkins, writing in The Spectator in 1983, regarded the statement as a mark of the immense relief of the Prime Minister at the successful conclusion of Operation Paraquet, a position with which Aitken concurred.

Rejoice, Rejoice is the title of a 1983 artwork by artist Michael Peel. Intending to demonstrate the human cost of the war, he constructed a photomontage of human arms and legs in the pattern of a Union Flag; the whole surrounded in red, white and blue ribbons with the text "next of kin will be informed" prominent. The work is now in the Imperial War Museum collection. The phrase was repeated by prominent Thatcher critic Edward Heath on her resignation in 1990. The word "rejoice" was controversially used by Labour prime minister Tony Blair in the House of Commons in 2004, following the Iraq War. Blair stated that "whatever mistakes have been made, rejoice that Iraq can have such a future" to dissent from his backbenchers and cries of "Thatcher!". Thatcher herself reused the word in a 13 June 2007 statement on the British Forces Broadcasting Service, marking the 25th anniversary of the recapture of the Falkland Islands: "the whole nation rejoiced at the success; and we should still rejoice". The Margaret Thatcher Foundation holds, in its archive, a draft copy of Nott's statement.
