= Grass Island, South Georgia =

Island in the South Atlantic South Georgian islands

Grass Island
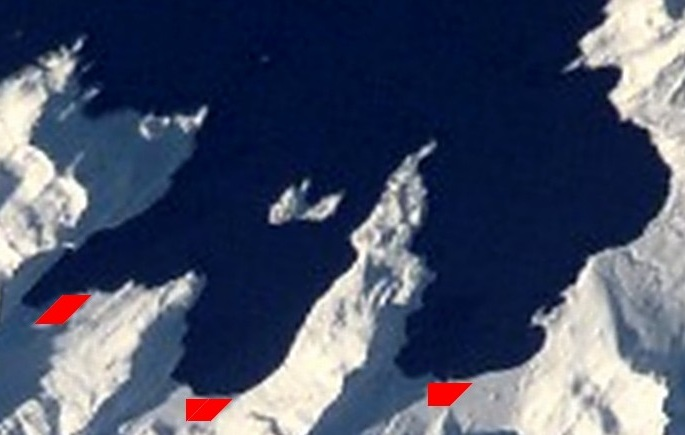
- Stromness Bay, location of the Grass Island

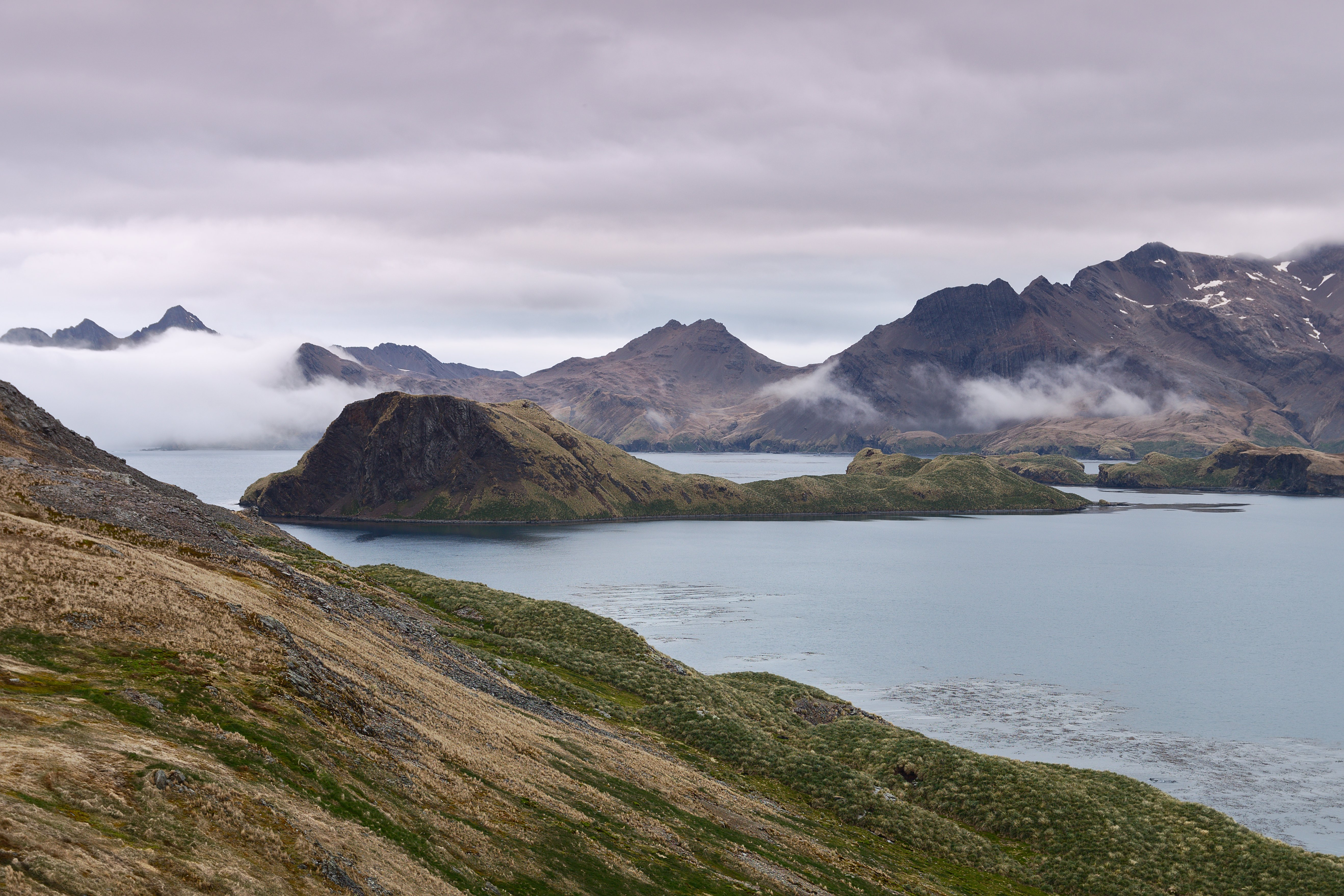
- Grass Island (center)

Geography
- Coordinates: 54°9′30″S 36°40′0″W
- Archipelago: South Georgia

Administration
- United Kingdom

Grass Island (Spanish: Isla Pasto) is a 30-hectare (74 acres) island located at the entrance to Stromness Harbour in Stromness Bay, South Georgia. It was known as Mutton Island as early as 1912, but since 1920 the name Grass Island has been consistently used.

== Ecology ==
The island is a breeding location for giant petrels. The invasive beetle Temnostega antarcticus had by 1996 spread to the island, after being introduced to South Georgia at one spot near Husvik, the easternmost of the three whaling stations located in Stromness Bay.

In the summer of 2000, an operation targeting the Norway rat, an introduced species on South Georgia and its surrounding islands, was successful in eradicating the island's rat population, bringing hope that the rats may be able to be eradicated from the whole region. After the eradication of the rats, South Georgia pipits re-established a presence on the island, and the island's population of white-chinned petrels was reported to have increased.

== Falklands War ==
After South Georgia had been invaded and occupied by Argentina on the 3 April, 1982, during the Falklands War, the British used Grass Island during the staging of Operation Paraquet; the operation to recapture South Georgia. On 22 and 23 April, 1982, after a British Special Boat Service team had been driven back by snow at Cumberland East Bay, a troop of the Special Air Service was landed on Grass Island from HMS Antrim. Once on the island they set up an observation post in preparation for a British attack on the Argentine positions on South Georgia.

== See also ==
- Composite Antarctic Gazetteer
- List of Antarctic islands north of 60° S
- Scientific Committee on Antarctic Research
