= Bantam (missile) =

1960s Swedish anti-tank missile by Bofors

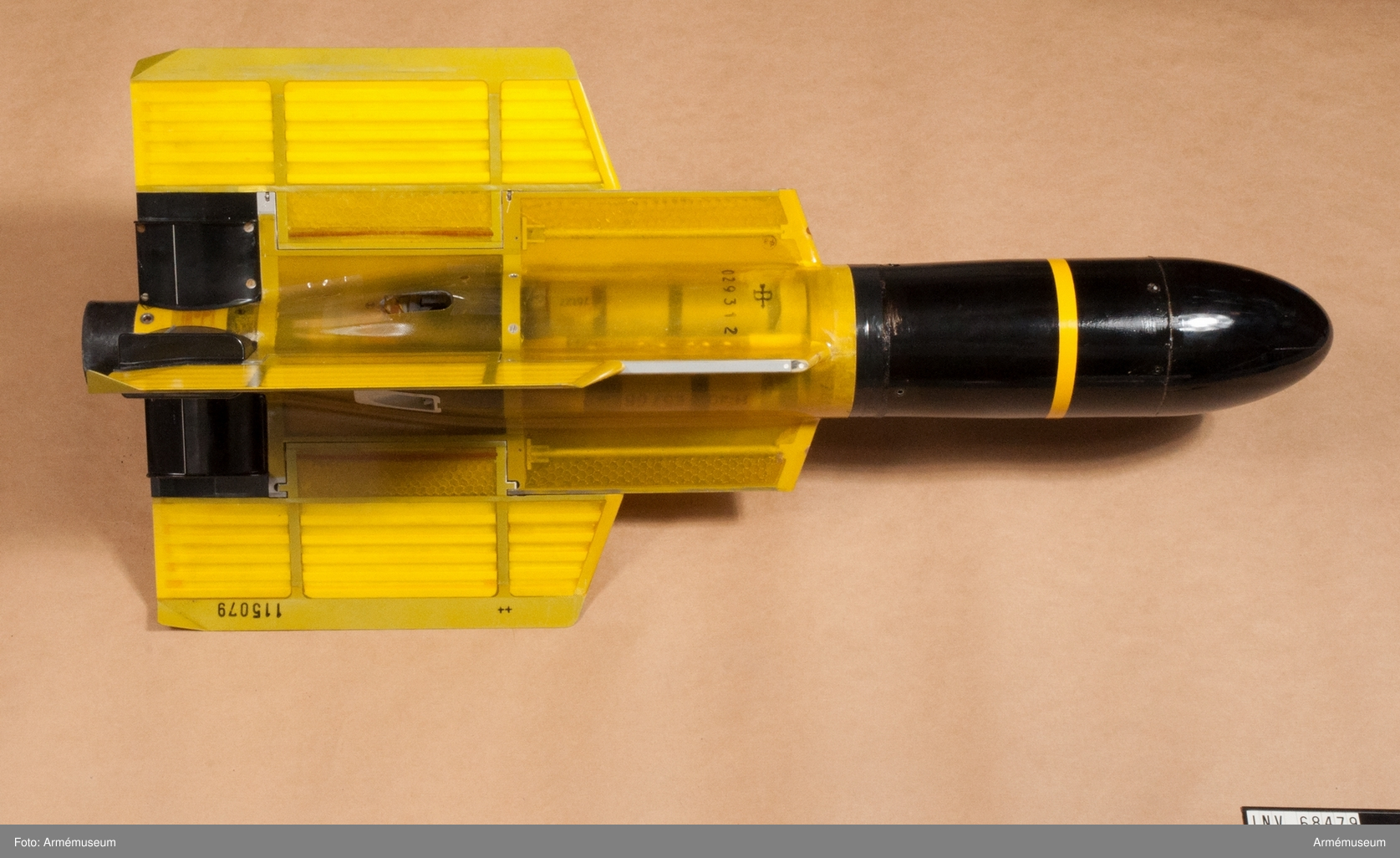
Robot 53 Bantam

The Bantam (Bofors ANti-TAnk Missile) or Robot 53 (Rb 53) was a Swedish wire-guided, manual command to line of sight, anti-tank missile developed in the late 1950s by Bofors. It served with the Swedish and Swiss armies from 1963 and 1967 respectively. It can either be deployed by a single man carrying a missile and control equipment or from a vehicle. It has been fitted to the Volvo L3314 and the Scottish Aviation Bulldog. In the Swiss Army, it was mounted on Steyr-Daimler-Puch Haflinger light wheeled vehicles, as well as experimentally on a MOWAG Tornado IFV prototype

The Bantam missile was used operationally by Argentine Marines during a British helicopter attack on the ARA Santa Fe during Operation Paraquet in the 1982 Falklands War. As the submarine approached Grytviken, she came under attack by several British helicopters. Argentine troops at King Edward Point responded with machine-gun fire and at least one Bantam missile. The Santa Fe crew attempted to defend themselves with small arms, but were unable to halt the assault and Santa Fe sustained severe damage before being scuttled.

== Description ==
The missile is carried in a rectangular launcher box, which is connected to a control box by a 20-meter cable, allowing for a degree of separation from the operator. The missile can be set up in around 30 seconds by a single man. The transporter/launcher box is pointed toward the expected direction of the enemy and the control box is attached to it using the cable. The manual command to line of sight (MCLOS) control box consists of an optical sighting device and a joystick, which transmits commands to the missile via two thin cables that are trailed behind the missile.

On launch, a small gyroscope is spun up by the firing of a powder pellet. The missile is propelled into the air by a booster motor, which takes the missile to its flight speed of approximately 85 meters per second. As it leaves the launcher box, four wings unfold, which begin to spin the missile in flight, which provides a degree of stability. Once the missile has travelled about 30 meters the gyro is unlocked and operator-controlled flight begins. Once 40 meters of wire has deployed from one of the missile's two spools, the sustainer motor is ignited along with up to four tracer flares in the back of the missile. At 45 meters range, the booster motor runs out. Once 230 meters of wire have deployed from the second spool of wire, the missile's shaped charge warhead is armed.

Commands from the joystick are relayed to the missile along the trailing wires, these commands are amplified by a small transistor circuit in the missile and are routed to vibrating spoilers on the trailing edge of the missile's four wings based on the direction of the command and the gyro-sensed orientation of the missile.

On impact with a target, a piezo-electric fuze triggers the shaped-charge warhead, which can penetrate up to 500 millimeters of armour. It has a claimed hit probability of 95 to 98% between the ranges of 800 and 2,000 meters.

The Bantam is broadly similar to the Cobra anti-tank missile and Russian AT-1 Snapper first-generation anti-tank missiles.

== Operators ==
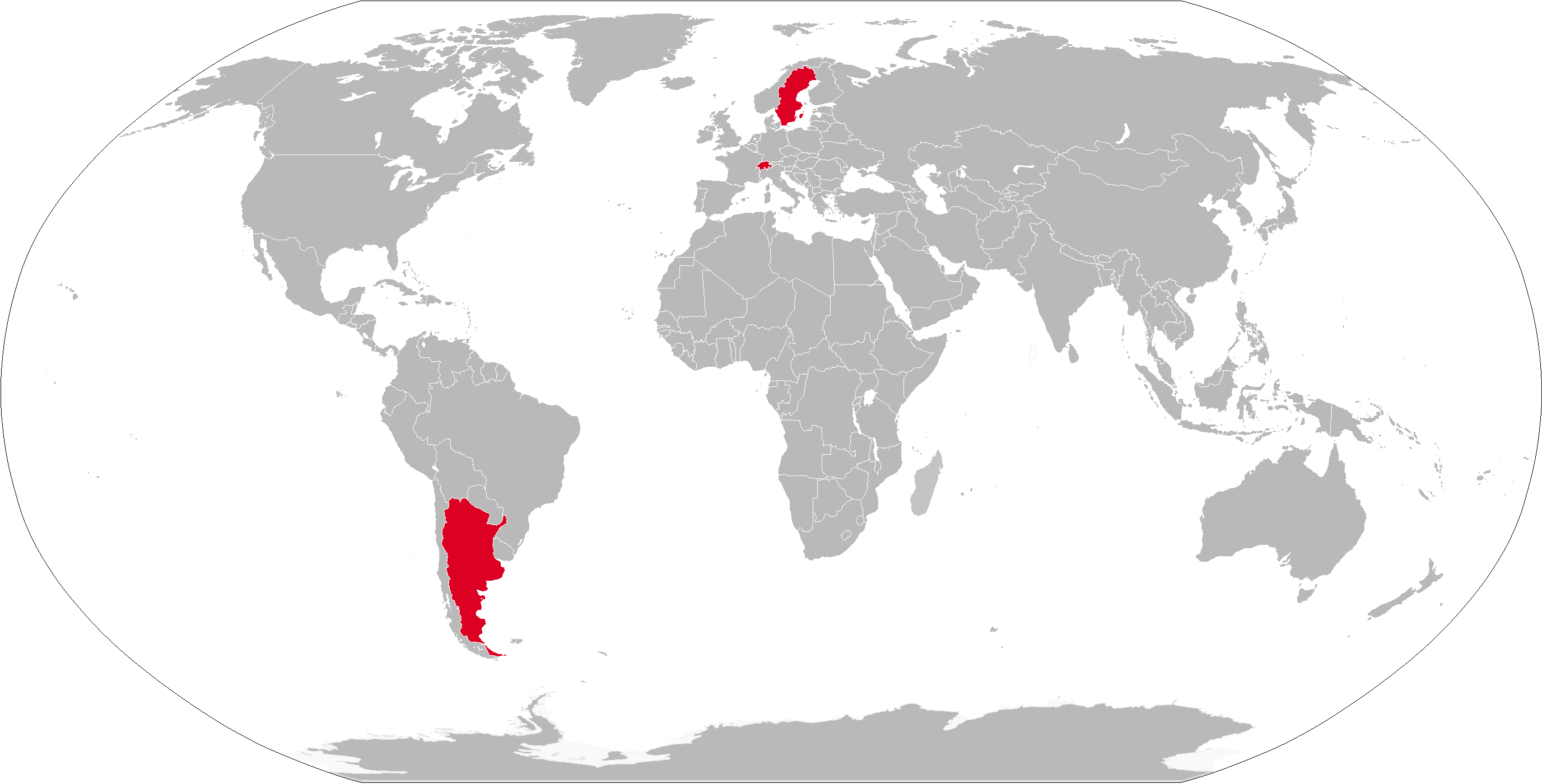
Former Bantam operators in red

=== Former operators ===
Argentina
Argentine Marine Corps
Sweden
Swedish Army
Switzerland
Swiss Army, systems Bantam BB65 (9 missiles) mounted on 200 Steyr Puch 700 AP Haflinger, used by infantry troops from 1969 to 1994.

== Specifications ==
- Length: 0.85 m
- Diameter: 0.11 m
- Wingspan: 0.40 m
- Weight of missile: 7.6 kg
- Weight of missile and launcher box: 13 kg
- Range: 300 to 2,000 m
- Speed: 85 m/s
- Warhead: 1.14 kg shaped charge

== See also ==
- Vickers Vigilant – (United Kingdom)
