= ARA Santa Fe (S-21) =

Balao Guppy II class submarine of the Argentine Navy

Coordinates: 54°10′59″S 36°22′32″W

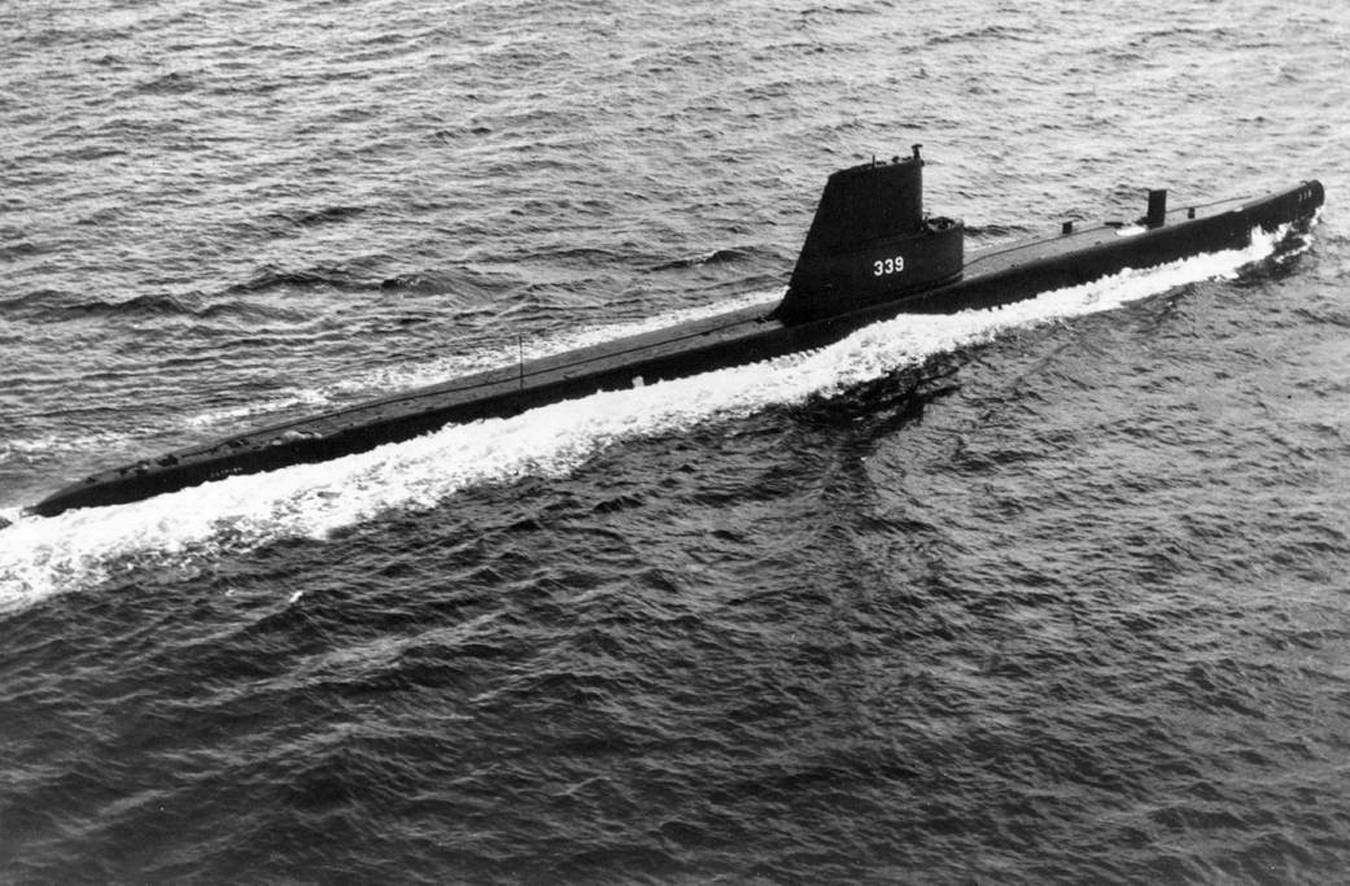
- Catfish underway, during her visit to the Far East, 1956.

History

United States
- Name: USS Catfish
- Namesake: Catfish
- Builder: Electric Boat Company, Groton, Connecticut
- Laid down: 6 January 1944
- Launched: 19 November 1944
- Commissioned: 19 March 1945
- Decommissioned: 1 July 1971
- In service: World War II; Korean War
- Stricken: 1 July 1971
- Identification: SS-339
- Fate: Transferred to Argentina, 1 July 1971

Argentina
- Name: ARA Santa Fe
- Namesake: Santa Fe
- Acquired: 1 July 1971
- In service: Falklands War
- Fate: Captured by British during Falklands War and scuttled

General characteristics (As completed)
- Class & type: Balao-class diesel-electric submarine
- Displacement: 1,526 tons (1,550 t) surfaced; 2,424 tons (2,463 t) submerged
- Length: 311 ft 9 in (95.02 m)
- Beam: 27 ft 3 in (8.31 m)
- Draft: 16 ft 10 in (5.13 m) maximum
- Propulsion: 4 × General Motors Model 16-278A V16 diesel engines driving electrical generators; 2 × 126-cell Sargo batteries; 4 × high-speed General Electric electric motors with reduction gears; 2 × propellers; 5,400 shp (4.0 MW) surfaced; 2,740 shp (2.0 MW) submerged
- Speed: 20.25 knots (38 km/h) surfaced; 8.75 knots (16 km/h) submerged
- Range: 11,000 nautical miles (20,000 km) surfaced at 10 knots (19 km/h)
- Endurance: 48 hours at 2 knots (3.7 km/h) submerged; 75 days on patrol
- Test depth: 400 ft (120 m)
- Complement: 10 officers, 70–71 enlisted
- Armament: 10 × 21-inch (533 mm) torpedo tubes; 6 forward, 4 aft; 24 torpedoes; 1 × 5-inch (127 mm) / 25 caliber deck gun; Bofors 40 mm and Oerlikon 20 mm cannon

General characteristics (Guppy II)
- Class & type: none
- Displacement: 1,870 tons (1,900 t) surfaced; 2,440 tons (2,480 t) submerged
- Length: 307 ft (93.6 m)
- Beam: 27 ft 4 in (7.4 m)
- Draft: 17 ft (5.2 m)
- Propulsion: Snorkel added; Batteries upgraded to GUPPY type, capacity expanded to 504 cells (1 × 184 cell, 1 × 68 cell, and 2 × 126 cell batteries); 4 × high-speed electric motors replaced with 2 × low-speed direct drive electric motors
- Speed: Surfaced: 18.0 knots (33.3 km/h) maximum; 13.5 knots (25.0 km/h) cruising; Submerged: 16.0 knots (29.6 km/h) for ½ hour; 9.0 knots (16.7 km/h) snorkeling; 3.5 knots (6.5 km/h) cruising
- Range: 15,000 nm (28,000 km) surfaced at 11 knots (20 km/h)
- Endurance: 48 hours at 4 knots (7 km/h) submerged
- Complement: 9–10 officers; 5 petty officers; 70 enlisted men
- Sensors & processing systems: WFA active sonar; JT passive sonar; Mk 106 torpedo fire control system
- Armament: 10 × 21 inch (533 mm) torpedo tubes; (six forward, four aft); all guns removed

ARA Santa Fe was an Argentine Balao-class submarine that was lost during the Falklands War. Built by the United States during the Second World War, the ship operated in the U.S. Navy as USS Catfish (SS-339) until 1971 when she was transferred to the Argentine Navy. She served until 1982 when she was captured by the British at South Georgia after being seriously damaged and subsequently sank along a pier, with just her conning tower (sail) visible above the waterline. The submarine was raised, towed out of the bay and scuttled in deep water in 1985.

== U.S. Navy service ==
Catfish was launched 19 November 1944 by Electric Boat Co., Groton, Connecticut; sponsored by Mrs. J. J. Crowley; and commissioned 19 March 1945.

Catfish sailed from New London 4 May 1945 for Pearl Harbor, arriving 29 June. After training and the installation of new equipment, she proceeded to Guam for special training, then departed 8 August on her first war patrol, a special mission to locate a minefield off Kyūshū. When the cease-fire order was given 15 August, she was ordered to the Yellow Sea for surface patrol and lifeguard duty. She returned to Guam 4 September, thence to the West Coast, arriving at Seattle 29 September.

Based at San Diego, Catfish operated locally on the west coast and made two cruises to the Far East during which she conducted simulated war patrols and provided services to the Seventh Fleet.

Catfish was extensively modernized in a GUPPY II conversion (August 1948–May 1949), giving her greater submerged speed and endurance. She was on another Far Eastern cruise when war broke out in Korea. Already in the area, she made a reconnaissance patrol in support of the United Nations forces. Catfish returned to the States 20 October 1950 and was based in San Diego.

After that the submarine carried out training exercises with the Naval Reserve off the west coast, operated with the Canadian Forces in joint antisubmarine warfare exercises, and made several cruises to the Far East.

Catfish was decommissioned and transferred to the Argentine Navy on 1 July 1971.

=== Awards ===
- Asiatic-Pacific Campaign Medal with one battle star
- World War II Victory Medal
- Navy Occupation Medal with "ASIA" clasp
- China Service Medal
- National Defense Service Medal with star
- Korean Service Medal
- Armed Forces Expeditionary Medal with star
- Vietnam Service Medal with two campaign stars
- United Nations Korea Medal
- Republic of Vietnam Campaign Medal

== Argentine service ==
Catfish was renamed ARA Santa Fe (S-21), after she was acquired by Argentina in 1971, along with her sister ship USS Chivo (SS-341) which was renamed ARA Santiago del Estero (S-22), a Balao-class GUPPY 1A submarine.

=== Chile conflict ===
In the 1978 conflict between Argentina and Chile, the Argentine Submarine Force deployed all four submarines, including Santa Fe and her sister ship Santiago del Estero, which made several patrols in the conflict area. Peace was achieved on 21 December, in part due to the visit of the Pope and the diplomatic intervention of both countries, and war was avoided. All Argentine ships returned to port without any incident.

=== Falklands War ===
In 1982, the ship's commander was Captain Horacio Bicain. In March 1982, Santa Fe participated in an exercise called Cimarron, together with the Uruguayan Navy. Her sister ship, Santiago del Estero, was no longer in operation. She took part in the Falklands War (2 April–14 June 1982) alongside San Luis, a German Type 209, which was the other operational Argentine submarine.

Santa Fe supported the landings on 2 April as part of Operation Rosario, transporting divers from the Agrupacion de Buzos Tacticos to Playa Roja - Yorke Bay - and marking the beach for the main amphibious force, completing this objective at 3am; the main assault at Playa Roja began at 6.30am. As part of Operation Rosario, the ARA Santa Fe divers also seized the lighthouse at Cape Pembroke. Once the mission was complete, the submarine returned to Argentina, arriving on 7 April.

On 12 April, Santa Fe was ordered to ferry a party of Argentine marines and supplies to Grytviken, in South Georgia. The island of South Georgia is situated 784 NM southeast of Falklands, 1,300 NM east of South America, 2,600 NM west of Africa and 720 NM north of Antarctica. Santa Fe departed from Mar del Plata in the early hours of 16 April, being armed with WWII-vintage Mk 14 and Cold War Mk 37 torpedoes, and also carrying supplies for the Argentine garrison that had been in the island since 3 April. On 24 April, the submarine reached the island and began unloading supplies. Members of the Argentine garrison had salvaged a crippled BAS launch, which was used to unload the cargo. Among other supplies were Bantam anti-tank missiles and a recoilless rifle; heavy equipment that had to be maneuvered through the hatch by hand, and then to the small boat, which carried out three trips ferrying troops and supplies. This part of the mission ended at 5:44am on 25 April, and then Santa Fe quickly departed, trying to reach ocean depth deep enough to safely submerge.

==== Fatal attack ====
On 23 April, the Royal Navy ships HMS Brilliant, HMS Antrim, HMS Plymouth and the ice patrol ship HMS Endurance had been sent to retake the island of South Georgia, with a detachment of Royal Marines and Special Boat Squadron commandos. This was Operation Paraquet. Around 6am on 25 April, after leaving Grytviken, Santa Fe was detected on radar by Lieutenant Chris Parry, the observer of the Westland Wessex HAS.3 anti-submarine helicopter from Antrim, and attacked with depth charges. This attack caused extensive internal damage, including the splitting of a ballast tank, the dismounting of electrical components and shocks to the machinery. As the submarine struggled to return to Grytviken on the surface, Plymouth launched a Westland Wasp HAS.1 helicopter, and Brilliant launched a Westland Lynx HAS.2. The Lynx dropped a Mk 46 torpedo, which failed to strike home, but strafed the submarine with its pintle-mounted 7.62 mm L7 General Purpose Machine Gun (GPMG). The Wessex also fired on Santa Fe with its GPMG. The Wasp from HMS Plymouth and two other Wasps launched from Endurance fired AS-12 air-to-surface anti-ship missiles at the submarine. Due to the fiberglass material of the ship's sail, the missiles passed from side to side. Corporal Alberto Macias was severely wounded, later having a leg amputated. Machine gun fire was used to respond to the attack from the ship as it retreated back to Grytviken. Santa Fe was fitted with doors at the sail, from which to shoot while navigating on the surface. It was a feature that most American submariners considered unnecessary, as it was unlikely to be used in modern warfare.

Once ashore, Santa Fe's crew and the Argentine garrison at South Georgia, still under attack, attempted to fire their rifles and machine guns and a Bantam anti-tank missile at the aircraft, which missed. The Argentine boat was damaged badly enough to prevent her from navigating. The British aircraft decided to end the attack and retreat to their ships. The crew abandoned the listing submarine at Grytviken pier. At 5pm on 25 April the Grytviken garrison commander surrendered, after being warned by the main guns of the ships HMS Plymouth (F-126) and HMS Antrim (D-18); there were also several helicopters in the area, transporting SAS and SBS commandos to strategic points. Lt. Alfredo Astiz and fifteen of his men, at Port Leith, initially refused to surrender on 25 April, but did so on the morning of 26 April.

==== Reclamation and disposal ====
A Royal Navy officer told the Santa Fe's captain, Cpt. Horacio Bicain, that they would have to work together to move the submarine from the main pier in Grytviken to a whaler quay, about 2,000 yards away. To accomplish the move, a reduced crew was assigned, Cpt. Bicain being one of them. The British assigned some guards. While under guard on the submarine by a British Royal Marine, Argentine Navy Petty Officer Felix Artuso was mistakenly shot dead on 26 April while a prisoner of war. His body was buried at Grytviken Cemetery. Artuso was shot because it was believed that he was trying to sabotage the vessel. According to some members of her crew, in the middle of the confusion that followed the incident, a number of valves and hatchways were left open, the submarine flooded and sank alongside the pier, with only her combat-damaged conning tower showing above the surface. Artuso is the only Argentine buried in the Georgias, and the only Argentine submariner who died in a war.

Before the conflict ended on 14 June, the crew of ARA Santa Fe had been taken as POWs to Ascension Island, from where a Red Cross-chartered airliner flew them to Uruguay. The half-sunken submarine remained in Grytviken. During June 1982, tugs dragged it to a shallow inlet called Moraine Fjord, with part of the sail still visible. The submarine was considered to be worthless as a war prize because she was non-standard, obsolete, badly damaged and too expensive to repair. In 1983, a first attempt to dispose of the ship was made, but a storm came on and it sank completely in slightly deeper water, where it remained for over a year. However, the submarine was still loaded with torpedoes, there was oil leaking from it, acidic electrolyte in the batteries, and lead-based paint flaking off. As a result, in 1985, the British Ministry of Defence arranged the final disposal of the ship, Operation Okehampton. This costly operation involved the specialist ship MV Salvageman and the government-owned ship RMAS Goosander, divers and special equipment in order to lift the submarine to the surface. The submarine was temporarily raised on 11 February, the contaminating elements were removed over a period of eight days, and the submarine was towed into deep water and scuttled north of South Georgia, about 5 miles out, on 20 February 1985.

== See also ==
- Argentine Submarine Force
