= HMS Antrim (D18) =

County-class guided missile destroyer of the Royal Navy and Chilean Navy

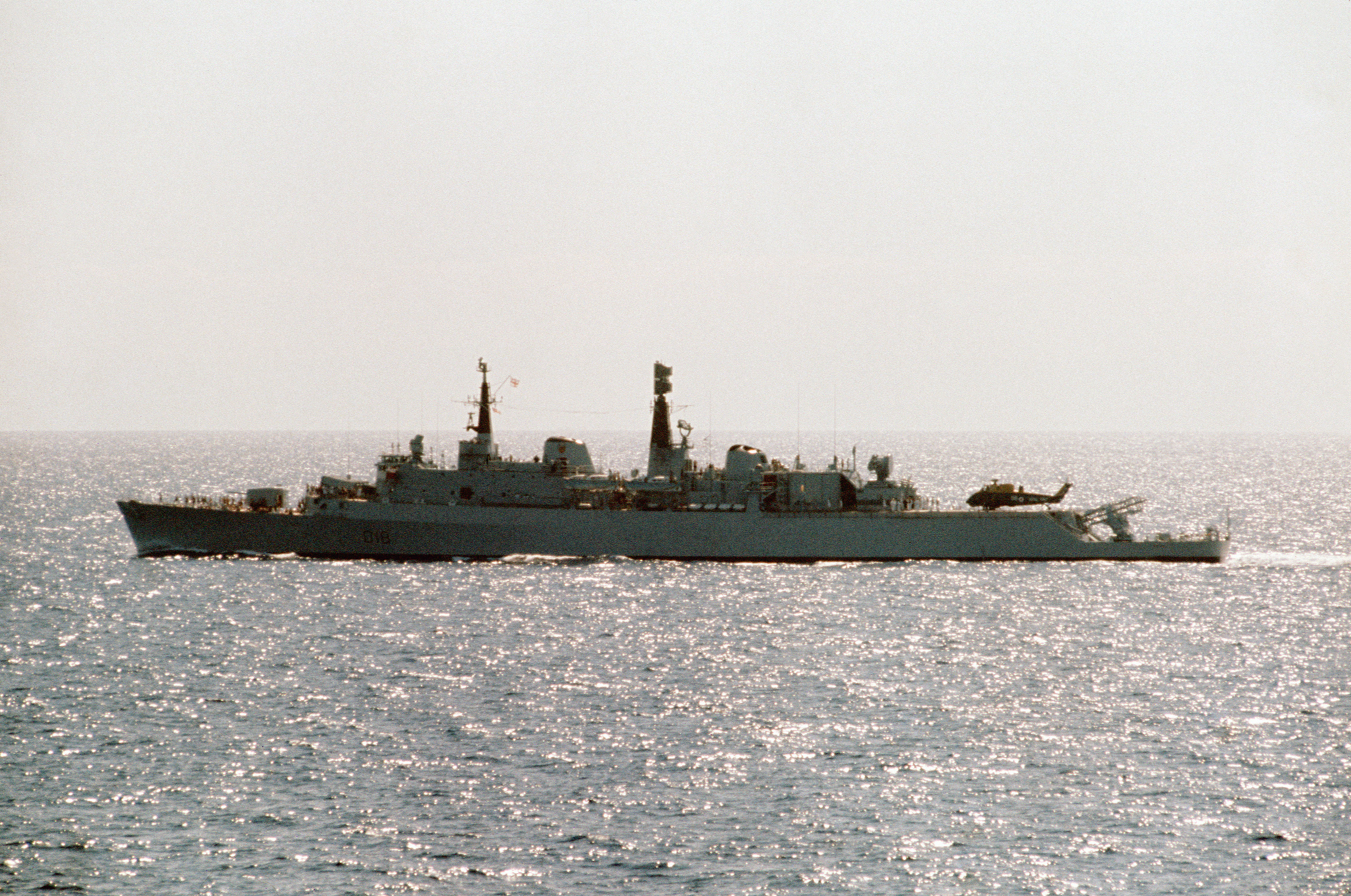
- HMS Antrim in 1976

History

United Kingdom
- Name: HMS Antrim
- Namesake: County Antrim
- Ordered: 5 January 1965
- Builder: Upper Clyde Shipbuilders
- Laid down: 20 January 1966
- Launched: 19 October 1967
- Sponsored by: Mrs Roy Mason, wife of then Minister of Defence (Equipment), Roy Mason
- Commissioned: 14 July 1970
- Decommissioned: 1984
- Identification: Pennant number: D18
- Honours and awards: Falklands War
- Fate: Sold to Chile on 22 June 1984

Chile
- Name: Almirante Cochrane
- Namesake: Thomas Cochrane
- Acquired: 22 June 1984
- Decommissioned: 7 December 2006
- Fate: Sold for scrap 11 December 2010

General characteristics
- Class & type: County-class destroyer
- Displacement: 6,200 tons (6,800 tons full load)
- Length: 522 ft (159 m)
- Beam: 53 ft (16 m)
- Draught: 20 ft (6.1 m)
- Propulsion: COSAG (Combined steam and gas) turbines, 2 shafts
- Armament: 2 × Fore-mounted twin-gunned turret with 4.5-inch (114 mm) guns Mark N6 ("B" Turret was later replaced by 4× MM38 Exocet missile launchers); 2 × mountings for Oerlikon 20 mm cannon; 1 × Aft-mounted Seaslug GWS.2 SAM (24 missiles); 2 × Quad mountings (port & starboard) for Seacat GWS-22 SAM (In Chilean service, the Seacat was replaced by Barak surface-to-air missile system); 2 × triple-tube launchers for shipborne torpedoes. STWS 1.
- Aircraft carried: 1 × Wessex HAS Mk 3 helicopter
- Aviation facilities: Flight deck and enclosed hangar for embarking one helicopter

HMS Antrim was a County-class destroyer of the British Royal Navy launched on 19 October 1967. In the Falklands War, she was the flagship for the recovery of South Georgia, participating in the first anti-submarine operation conducted by helicopters. In 1984, she was commissioned into the Chilean Navy, and renamed Almirante Cochrane.

== Design and construction ==
The County-class was a class of guided-missile destroyer (also known as Destroyer Leader, Guided (DLG) in accordance with American terminology, and later sometimes described as cruisers) intended to meet a requirement for an anti-aircraft and anti-submarine escort for task forces, and were the first guided-missile armed ship to be built for the Royal Navy. Antrim was one of the last two Counties, which were ordered in 1964.

Antrim was 521 feet 6 inches (158.95 m) long overall and 505 feet (153.92 m) between perpendiculars, with a beam of 54 feet (16.46 m) and a draught of 20 feet 6 inches (6.25 m). Displacement was 6,200 long tons (6,300 t) normal and 6,800 long tons (6,900 t) deep load. The ship was propelled by a combination of steam turbines and gas turbines in a Combined steam and gas (COSAG) arrangement, driving two propeller shafts. Each shaft could by driven by a single 15,000 shaft horsepower (11,000 kW) steam turbine (fed with steam at 700 pounds per square inch (4,800 kPa) and 700 °F (371 °C; 644 K)) from Babcock & Wilcox boilers) and two Metrovick G6 gas turbines (each rated at 7,500 shaft horsepower (5,600 kW)), with the gas turbines being used for high speeds and to allow a quick departure from ports without waiting for steam to be raised. Maximum speed was 30 knots (35 mph; 56 km/h) and the ship had a range of 3,500 nautical miles (4,000 mi; 6,500 km) at 28 knots (32 mph; 52 km/h).

A twin launcher for the Seaslug anti-aircraft missile was fitted aft. Antrim was fitted with the improved Seaslug GWS2, which was a beam riding missile which had an effective range of about 23 mi; 37 km with a maximum altitude of 50,000 feet (15,000 m). Up to 39 Seaslugs could be carried horizontally in a magazine that ran much of the length of the ship. Close-in anti-aircraft protection was provided by a pair of Seacat launchers and two single Oerlikon 20mm cannons, while two twin QF 4.5 inch Mark V gun mounts were fitted forward. A helicopter deck and hangar allowed a single Westland Wessex helicopter to be operated.

A Type 965 long-range air-search radar and a Type 278 height-finding radar was fitted on the ship's mainmast, also fitted on the mainmast was an array of ECM aerials. A Type 992Q Medium range gunnery radar and navigation radar type 978 were fitted to the foremast, also fitted on the foremast was an array of ESM aerials. Type 901 fire control radar for the Seaslug missile was mounted aft. Type 184 sonar was fitted.

Antrim was laid down at Fairfield's Govan shipyard on 20 January 1966. Antrim was launched on 19 October 1967 with Marjorie Mason, wife of Roy Mason, the Secretary of State for Defence, as sponsor. Construction was delayed by industrial action and the merger of Fairfields into Upper Clyde Shipbuilders, with further delays occurring in 1969 due to a boiler explosion. Antrim was completed on 14 July 1970, although not finally commissioned until 30 March 1971. Antrim was the second ship of that name to serve with the Royal Navy.

== Operational history ==
After commissioning, Antrim continued an extensive programme of trials, which was not completed until October 1971. She served in home and Mediterranean waters, fulfilling standard peacetime duties, including NATO exercises and fleet deployments. In 1976 her commission included a visit to Stockholm, where she represented the Royal Navy at the wedding of the King of Sweden. By the end of the 1970s, Antrim had settled into a, peacetime role, carrying out patrols, NATO drills and presence missions in home waters.

=== Falklands War ===
In 1982, she formed part of the Royal Navy task force for service in the Falklands War, commanded by Captain Brian Young, who had previously been a Fleet Air Arm pilot and had seen action during the Suez Crisis.

Antrim was the flagship of Operation Paraquet, the operation to recover South Georgia.

On 25 April 1982, her Westland Wessex HAS.3 helicopter was responsible for rescuing 17 SAS personnel and the crew of two earlier rescue helicopters that had crashed on the Fortuna Glacier. The aircraft also played a key role in locating and disabling the Argentine submarine Santa Fe.

The Wessex, callsign Humphrey, detected Santa Fe on the surface and engaged using depth charges, which damaged the submarine's hull. This attack was followed by strikes from HMS Brilliant (F90)’s Lynx, using a torpedo, and from two AS.12 missile attacks by HMS Plymouth Westland Wasp helicopter. The damage forced the crew to abandon the submarine at King Edward Point, leaving her partially submerged alongside the jetty. She was not repaired and, in 1985, was scuttled in deep water. This was the first anti-submarine operation successfully conducted solely by helicopters.

After the disablement of Santa Fe, a scratch force of Royal Marines, SAS and SBS troops was landed to capture the settlement. Antrim and Plymouth took station off Grytviken and opened fire with their 4.5-inch guns. The shelling was a demonstration of firepower rather than an attack on specific positions and over the course of 15 minutes the two ships fired about 235 rounds towards Grytviken. The Argentine troops raised the white flag and surrendered to the scratch force.

Captain Lagos, commander of the Argentine forces on South Georgia, signed the surrender document for the garrison in Antrim’s wardroom. Lieutenant-Commander Alfredo Astiz signed a separate document shortly afterwards aboard Plymouth.

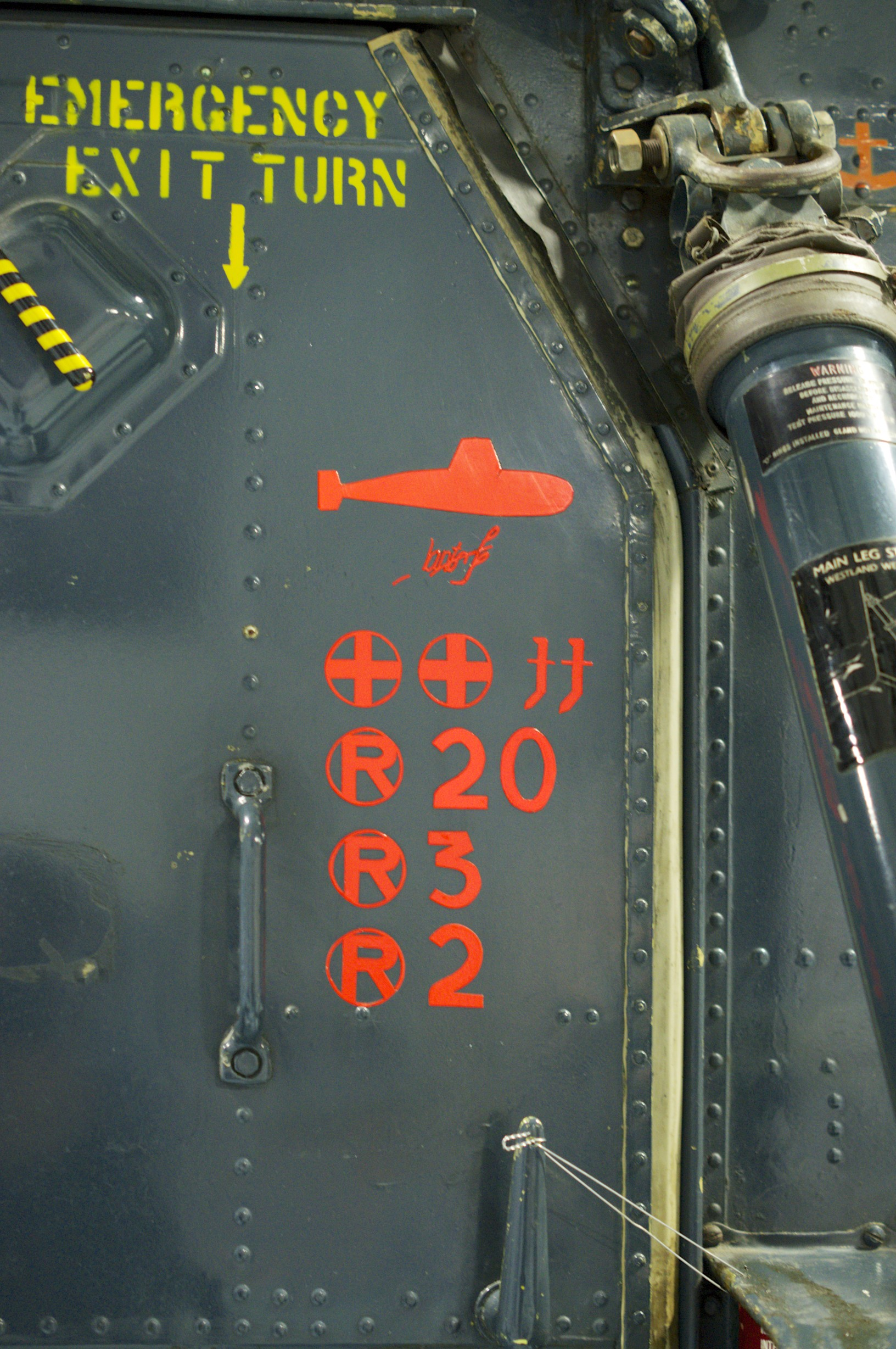
Wessex XP142 Humphrey at the Fleet Air Arm Museum

On 21 May 1982, in Falkland Sound, while supporting the main landings at San Carlos Water, several bombs narrowly missed Antrim, and a 1,000 lb bomb passed through the Seaslug magazine without detonating, eventually lodging in the aft heads. Antrim launched a Seaslug missile (some sources state two) at another wave of IAI Dagger aircraft but the aircraft were flying too low to be acquired by the missile's radar, making the launch unguided. This was intended to deter the pilots and to remove an exposed missile from the launcher as a fire and explosive risk. The Daggers strafed the ship with 30mm cannon.

Antrim’s 4.5-inch Mk V guns fired about 400 rounds during the campaign, in support of ground troops around San Carlos and other bombardments of Argentine positions.

Her Wessex helicopter (XP142) is preserved at the Fleet Air Arm Museum, RNAS Yeovilton in Somerset, with mission tallies marking its operational achievements: one submarine sunk (ARA Santa Fe), two CASEVACs, two Special Forces insertions, three rescues, and the number of personnel saved. The helicopter's outer skin shows shrapnel damage sustained from the Argentine Air Force Dagger strafing attack.

A name plate formerly belonging to the ship now resides in the Falkland Islands Museum, Stanley.

== Chilean Navy ==
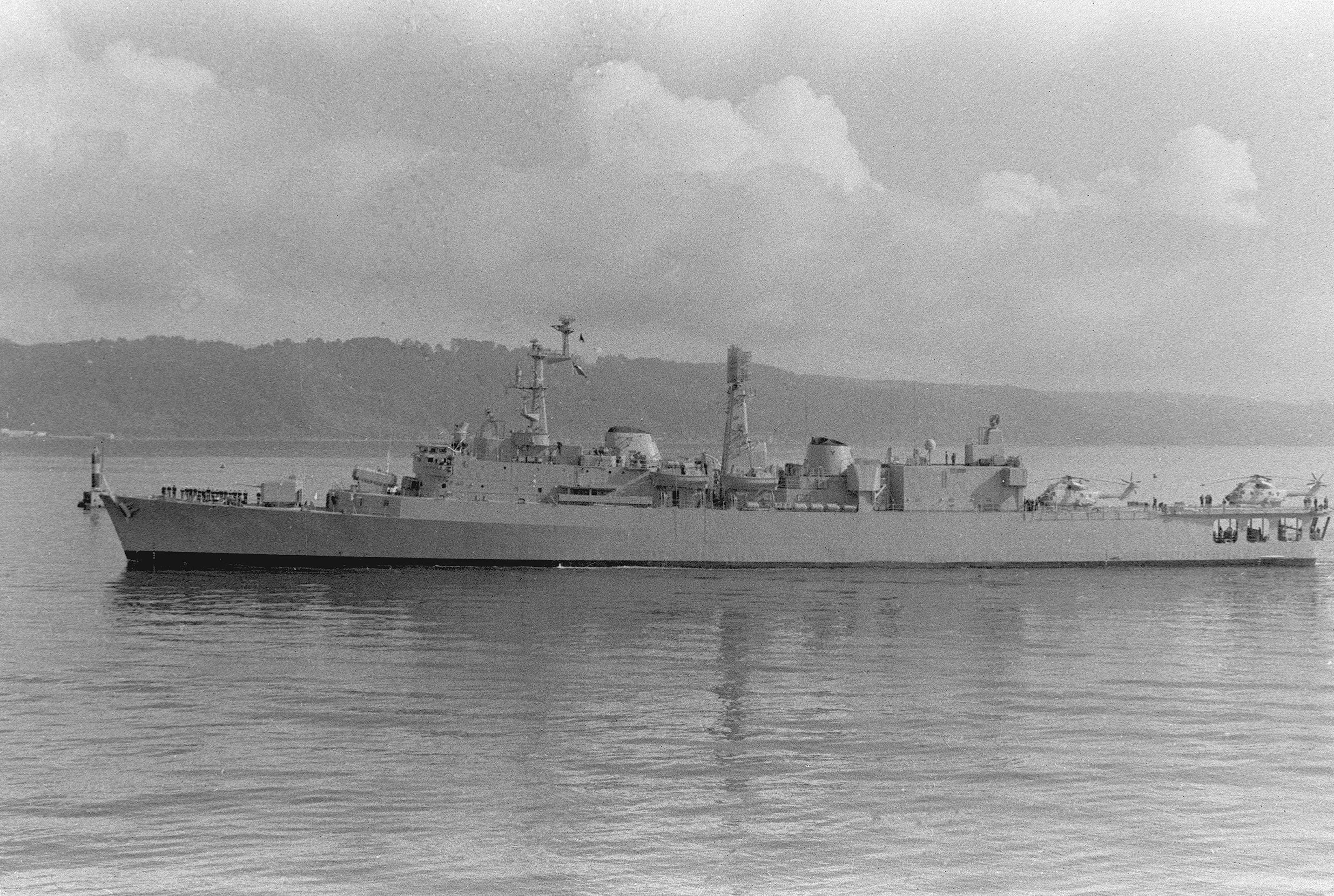
Chilean destroyer Almirante Cochrane

Antrim was decommissioned in 1984 and sold to Chile on 22 June 1984 and renamed Almirante Cochrane after Thomas Cochrane, who commanded the Chilean Navy from 1817 to 1822.

In 1994, Almirante Cochrane underwent the same refit as her sister ship Blanco Encalada (HMS Fife), which involved the removal of the Sea Slug launcher and the extension of the deck aft to accommodate a larger hangar. In 1996, she was fitted with the Barak 1 surface-to-air missile system in place of her Seacat launchers.

The Chilean Navy decommissioned Almirante Cochrane in December 2006 and she was towed to China for scrapping.

== Affiliates as HMS Antrim ==
- Royal Irish Rangers

As part of her relationship with County Antrim, she carried a piece of the Giant's Causeway mounted in the ship's main passageway, appropriately also named the Giant's Causeway.

== Commanding officers ==
Notable Royal Navy commanding officers include D A Loram 1971-1973 and B G Young 1981-1983. Chilean Navy commanding officers included A Cruz 1984-85 and J Chubretovch 2002.

== Sources ==
- Colledge, J. J.; Warlow, Ben (2006) [1969]. Ships of the Royal Navy: The Complete Record of All Fighting Ships of the Royal Navy from the 15th Century to the Present (3rd Rev ed.). London: Chatham Publishing. ISBN 978-1-86176-281-8. OCLC 67375475.
- Friedman, Norman (2008). British Destroyers & Frigates: The Second World War and After. Barnsley, UK: Seaforth Publishing. ISBN 978-1-84832-015-4.
- Gardiner, Robert; Chumbley, Stephen, eds. (1995). Conway's All The World's Fighting Ships 1947–1995. Annapolis, Maryland, USA: Naval Institute Press. ISBN 1-55750-132-7.
- Marriott, Leo (1989). Royal Navy Destroyers Since 1945. Shepperton, UK: Ian Allan. ISBN 0-7110-1817-0.
- McCart, Neil (2014). County Class Guided Missile Destroyers. Maritime Books. ISBN 978-1904459637.
- Moore, John, ed. (1979). Jane's Fighting Ships 1979–80. London: Jane's Yearbooks. ISBN 0-354-00587-1.
- Yates, D. (2006) Bomb Alley – Falklands War 1982: Aboard HMS Antrim at War, Pen & Sword Maritime, ISBN 1-84415-417-3
- Parry, Chris (2012) "Down South: a Falklands War Diary" Viking Penguin ISBN 978-0-670-92145-4
