= Gasoline (disambiguation) =

Gasoline, in American English, or petrol, in British English, is a transparent, petroleum-derived liquid that is used primarily as a fuel.

Gasoline may also refer to:

- Gasoline (film), a 2001 Italian crime film
- Gasoline, Texas, a ghost town in the United States

== Music ==
=== Artists ===
- Gasoline (band), an American Southern rock band

=== Albums ===
- Gasoline (Key album), 2022
- Gasoline (The Hard Lessons album), 2005
- Gasoline (Theory of a Deadman album), 2005

=== Songs ===
- "Gasoline" (1913 song)
- "Gasoline" (Seether song), 2003
- "Gasoline" (Haim song), 2021
- "Gasoline" (Halsey song), 2015
- "Gasoline" (Key song), 2022
- "Gasoline" (The Weeknd song), 2022
- "Gasoline", a song by The Airborne Toxic Event from The Airborne Toxic Event, 2008
- "Gasoline", a song by Audioslave from Audioslave, 2002
- "Gasoline", a song by Brand New from Daisy, 2009
- "Gasoline", a song by Britney Spears from Femme Fatale, 2011
- "Gasoline", a song by Catherine Wheel from Wishville, 2000
- "Gasoline", a song by Dieter Bohlen from the soundtrack album for Dieter: Der Film, 2006
- "Gasoline", a song by Enter the Haggis from Casualties of Retail, 2005
- "Gasoline", a song by I Prevail from Trauma, 2019
- "Gasoline", a song by Karate from Karate, 1995
- "Gasoline", a song by Måneskin from Rush!, 2023
- "Gasoline", a song by Moist from Creature, 1996
- "Gasoline", a song by Paw from Dragline, 1993
- "Gasoline", a song by Troye Sivan from TRXYE, 2014

=== Others ===
- Gasoline (magazine), a Canadian quarterly rock music magazine

== See also ==
- Gasolin' (disambiguation)
- Gasolina (disambiguation)
- Petrol (disambiguation)
