= Petroleum (disambiguation) =

Petroleum is a naturally occurring, flammable hydrocarbon.

Petroleum may also refer to:

Place names

- Petroleum, Indiana
- Petroleum, Kentucky
- Petroleum County, Montana
- Petroleum, West Virginia

Arts

- "Petroleum", a song by Swedish band Kent from their 2012 album I Am Not Afraid of the Dark (Jag är inte rädd för mörkret)
- Petroleum (film), 1936 Mexican film

== See also ==
- Petrol (disambiguation)
- Gasoline (disambiguation)
