= Gasolin' (disambiguation) =

Gasolin' was a Danish rock band.

Gasolin' may also refer to:

- Gasolin' (1971 album), the first album by Gasolin'
- Gasolin' (1974 album), the first English-language album by Gasolin'
- Gasolin' (film), a documentary about Gasolin'

== See also ==
- Gasoline (disambiguation)
