= South Georgia Museum =

Institution centered around British South Atlantic history; Shackleton's resting place

Coordinates: 54.2802°S 36.5076°W

- Motto: The Museum at the End of the World

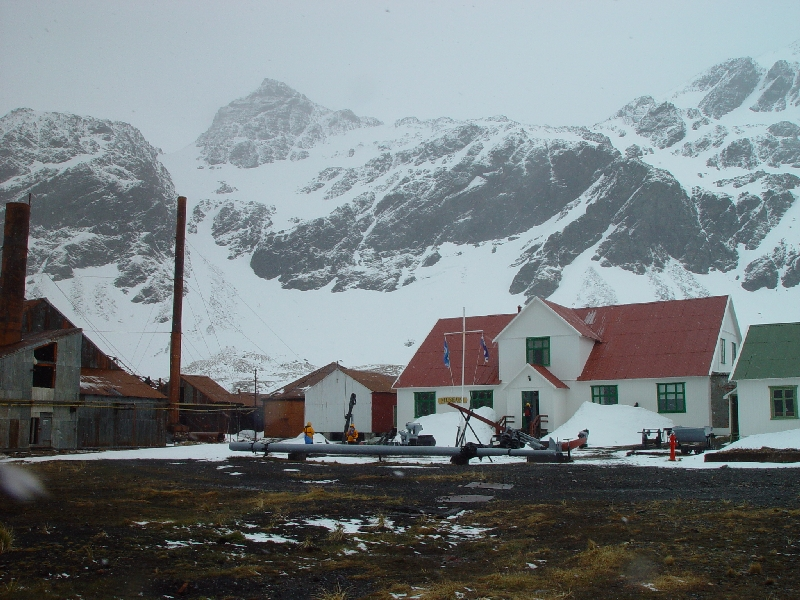
- South Georgia Museum, Grytviken
- Established: 1991
- Location: Grytviken, South Georgia and the South Sandwich Islands
- Founder: Nigel Bonner

The South Georgia Museum is situated in Grytviken, near the administrative centre of the UK overseas territory of South Georgia and the South Sandwich Islands. Polar explorers Ernest Shackleton and Frank Wild are buried in Grytviken's graveyard. The museum was established in 1991 by Nigel Bonner.

== History ==
The museum is housed in "the Villa". It was built in 1914, as a residence for the manager of the Grytviken whaling station and his family, and was occupied until the station closed in 1964.

The abandoned building suffered from the effects of severe weather, as well as the destructive actions of vandals. Decades later, after Antarctic scientist David Wynn-Williams suggested it be made into a museum, Antarctic and marine mammal specialist Nigel Bonner and a small team of workers, with funding support from the South Georgia Government, worked to remove environmental hazards at the abandoned whaling station, and renovate and restore the Villa for use as a museum. Bonner wrote: "If [the museum] causes [visitors] to think a little more deeply about the whaling industry, the management of natural resources, and the society of whalers, I think we shall have achieved our objective."

== Museum ==
The South Georgia Museum opened in 1992 as a specialised whaling museum, subsequently expanding its expositions to include all aspects of the discovery of the island, sealing industry, whaling, maritime and natural history, as well as the 1982 Falklands War.

The museum became a popular tourist venue, visited by approximately 10,000 cruise ship and yacht tourists a year until the COVID-19 pandemic.

The museum displays include a bronze bust of Duncan Carse by British sculptor Jon Edgar. Carse was influential in the mapping of South Georgia and the island's Mount Carse is named after him. The Bonner Room is named in recognition of Nigel Bonner's work in creating the museum. The Jarvis Room is named after Russell Jarvis, who was Deputy Governor of the Falkland Islands from 1997 to 2003, for his dedicated support of the museum.

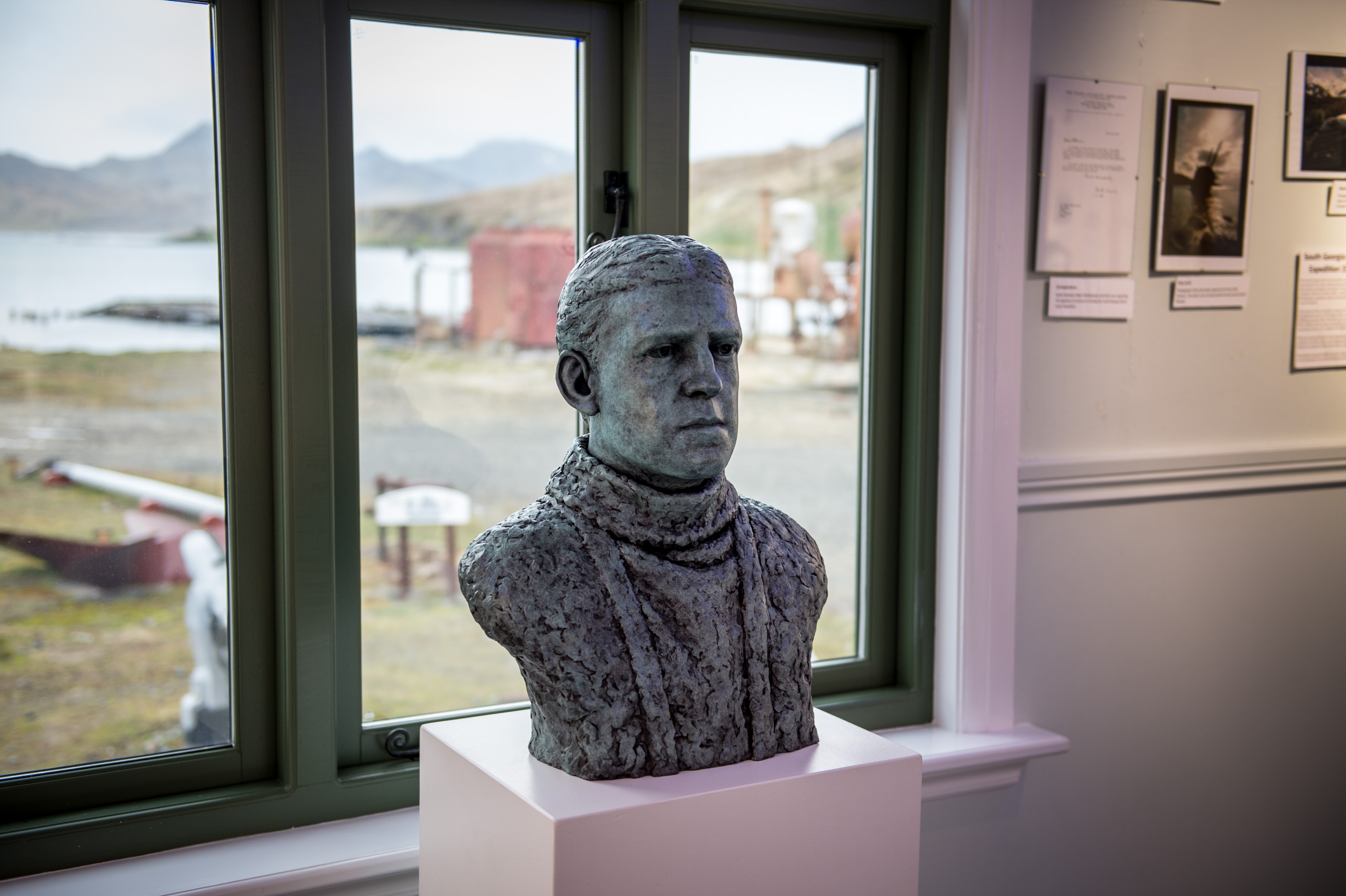
Bronze portrait bust of Sir Ernest Shackleton by Anthony Smith on display at the South Georgia Museum

For several years Tim and Pauline Carr served as museum curators, living on board their yacht Curlew moored in the Grytviken port. The museum is now managed by the South Georgia Heritage Trust and is staffed by three members who are the only non-permanent residents that live in Grytviken. The collection can also be viewed online.

An occasional artist-in-residence position is supported by the museum. Previous artists to have been resident at the museum include the British sculptor Anthony Smith, who in November 2017 delivered a life-sized bronze portrait bust of Sir Ernest Shackleton to the Museum, which is now on permanent display.

The museum reopened in December 2021.

== See also ==
- History of South Georgia and the South Sandwich Islands
- Norwegian Lutheran Church (Grytviken, South Georgia)
