= Grytviken =

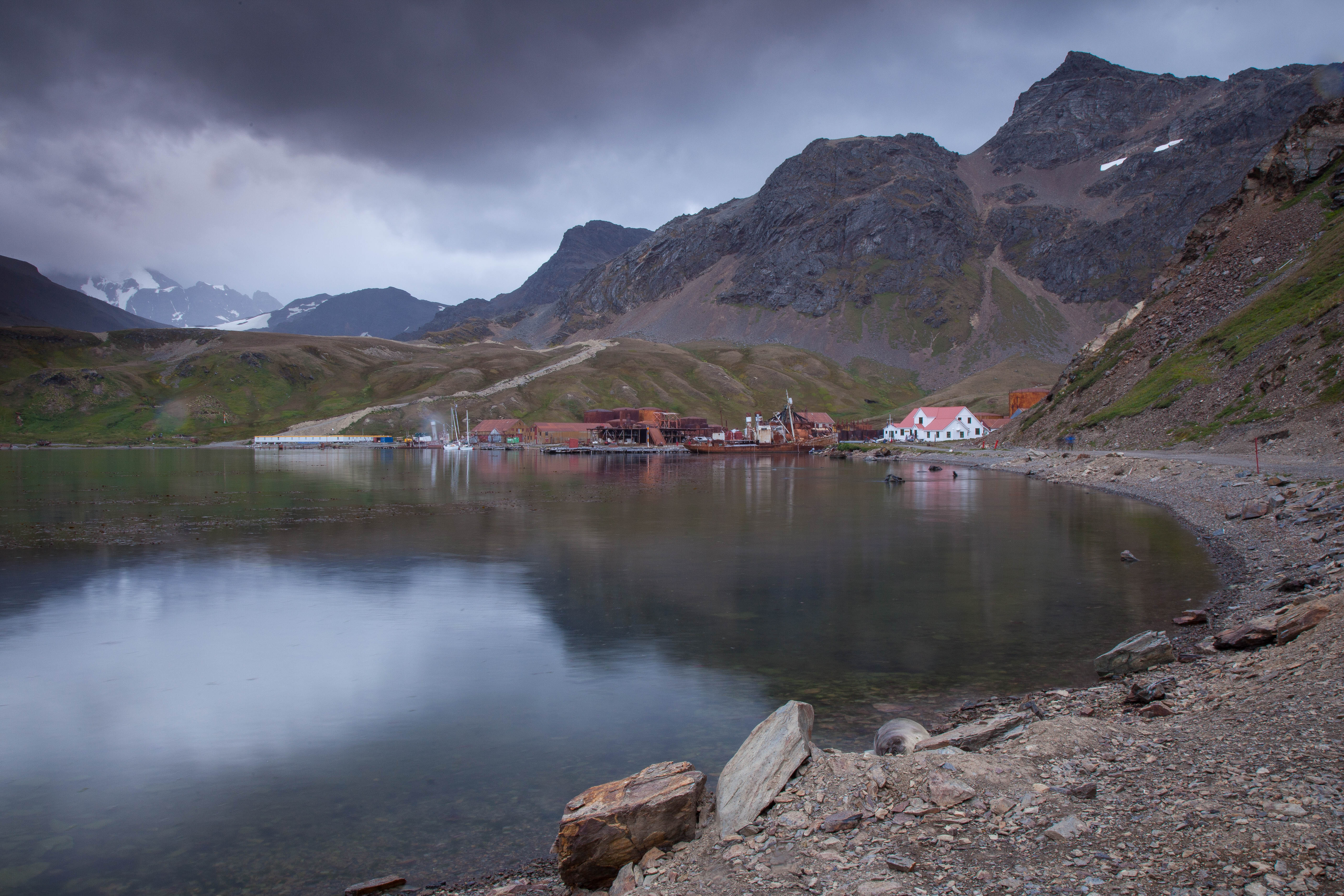

- Location of Grytviken and King Edward Point
- Coordinates: 54°16′53″S 36°30′29″W
- Country: United Kingdom
- British Overseas Territory: South Georgia and the South Sandwich Islands
- Disestablished: 1966

Population (2018)
  - Total: 3 (summer)
- Time zone: UTC−2 (GST)

Grytviken (/ˈɡrɪtviːkən/ GRIT-vee-kən; Norwegian: [ˈɡɾŷːtviːkn̩]) is a hamlet on South Georgia in the South Atlantic. Formerly a whaling station, it was the largest settlement on the island. Grytviken is located at the head of King Edward Cove within the larger Cumberland East Bay, considered the best harbour on the island. The location's name, meaning "pot bay", was coined in 1902 by the Swedish Antarctic Expedition and documented by the surveyor Johan Gunnar Andersson, after the expedition found old English try pots used to render seal oil at the site. Settlement was re-established on 16 November 1904 by Norwegian Antarctic explorer Carl Anton Larsen on the long-used site of former whaling settlements.

Grytviken is built on a substantial area of sheltered, flat land and has a good supply of fresh water. Although it was the largest settlement on South Georgia, the island's administration was based at the nearby British Antarctic Survey research station at King Edward Point. The whaling station closed in December 1966 when dwindling whale stocks made it financially unviable.

Grytviken no longer has permanent residents but occasionally accommodates researchers and British administrative and military personnel. It is also temporarily inhabited during summer months by a few staff who manage the South Georgia Museum. The settlement has become a popular attraction for Antarctic cruise lines, with many tourists visiting the resting places of polar explorers Sir Ernest Shackleton and Frank Wild in Grytviken's graveyard. Grytviken is located 900 metres (3,000 ft; 0.56 mi) west of King Edward Point, the administrative capital of South Georgia and its only remaining continuously inhabited settlement.

== History ==
=== Carl Anton Larsen ===
The settlement at Grytviken was established on 16 November 1904 by the Norwegian sea captain Carl Anton Larsen, as a whaling station for his Compañía Argentina de Pesca (Argentine Fishing Company). It was successful, with 195 whales taken in the first season. The whalers used every part of the animals – the blubber, meat, bones and viscera were rendered to extract the oil, and the bones and meat were turned into fertiliser and fodder. Elephant seals were also hunted for their blubber. Around 300 men worked at the station during its heyday, operating during the southern summer from October to March. A few remained over the winter to maintain the boats and factory. Every few months a transport ship would bring essential supplies to the station and take away the oil and other produce. The following year the Argentine Government established a meteorological station.

Carl Anton Larsen, the founder of Grytviken, was a naturalised Briton born in Sandefjord, Norway. In his application for British citizenship, filed with the magistrate of South Georgia and granted in 1910, Captain Larsen wrote: "I have given up my Norwegian citizen's rights and have resided here since I started whaling in this colony on the 16 November 1904 and have no reason to be of any other citizenship than British, as I have had and intend to have my residence here still for a long time." His family in Grytviken included his wife, three daughters and two sons.

As the manager of Compañía Argentina de Pesca, Larsen organised the construction of Grytviken, a remarkable undertaking accomplished by a team of sixty Norwegians between their arrival on 16 November and commencement of production at the newly built whale-oil factory on 24 December 1904.

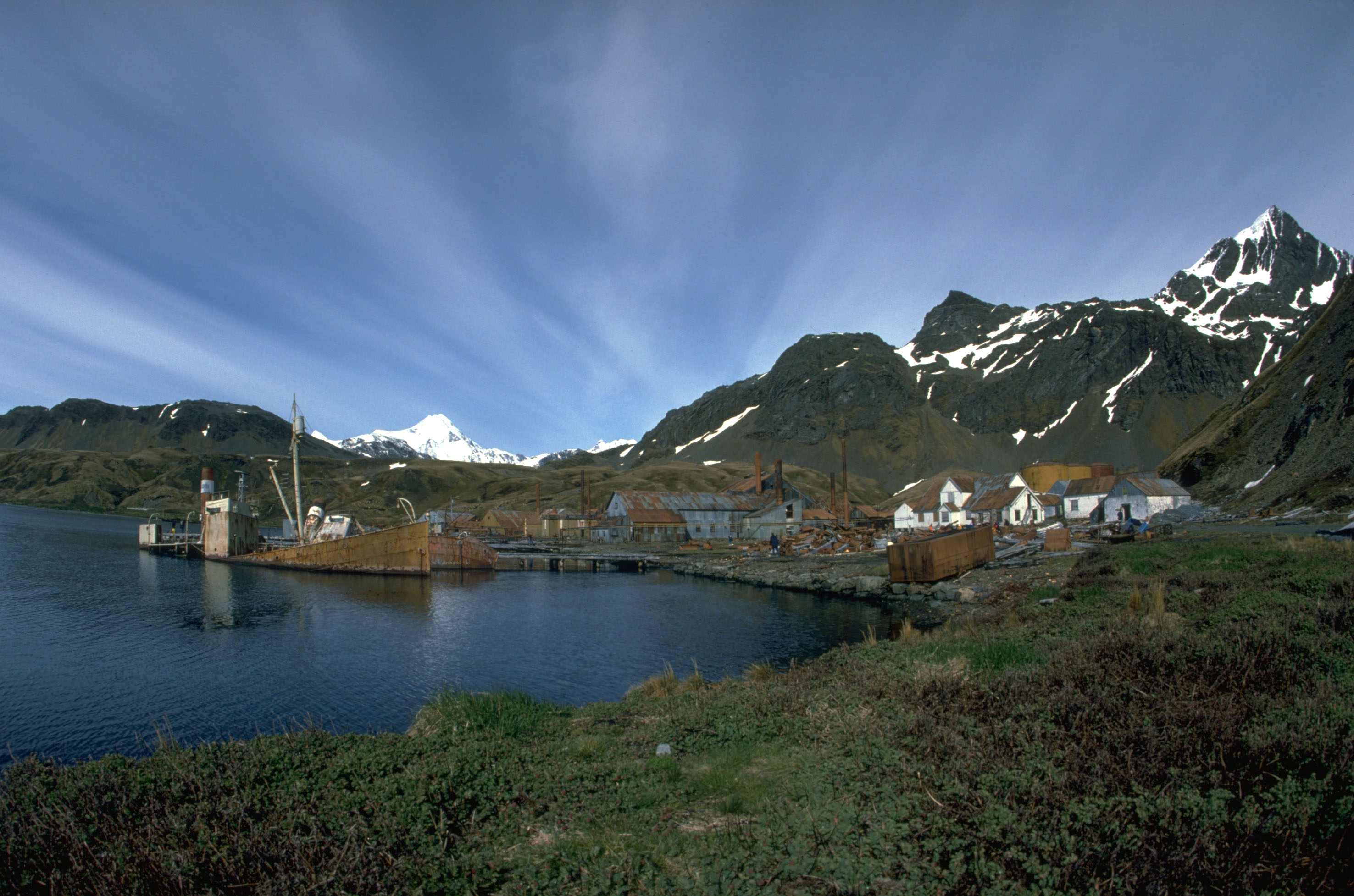
Whaling station Grytviken in 1989

Larsen chose the whaling station's site during his 1902 visit while in command of the ship Antarctic of the Swedish Antarctic Expedition (1901–1903) led by Otto Nordenskjöld. On that occasion, the name Grytviken ("The Pot Cove") was given by the Swedish archaeologist and geologist Johan Gunnar Andersson who surveyed part of Thatcher Peninsula and found numerous artefacts and features from sealers' habitation and industry, including a shallop (a type of small boat) and several try pots used to boil seal oil. One of those try pots, having the inscription "Johnson and Sons, Wapping Dock, London" is preserved at the South Georgia Museum in Grytviken.

Managers and other senior officers of the whaling stations often had their families living together with them. Among them was Fridthjof Jacobsen, whose wife, Klara Olette Jacobsen, gave birth to two of their children in Grytviken; their daughter Solveig Gunbjørg Jacobsen was the first child ever born south of the Antarctic Convergence, on 8 October 1913, and was raised there. Several more children have been born on South Georgia, recently even aboard visiting private yachts.

The whale population in the seas around the island was substantially reduced over the following sixty years until the station closed in December 1966, by which time the whale stocks were so low that their continued exploitation was unviable. Even now, the shore around Grytviken is littered with whale bones and the rusting remains of whale oil processing plants and abandoned whaling ships.

=== Ernest Shackleton ===
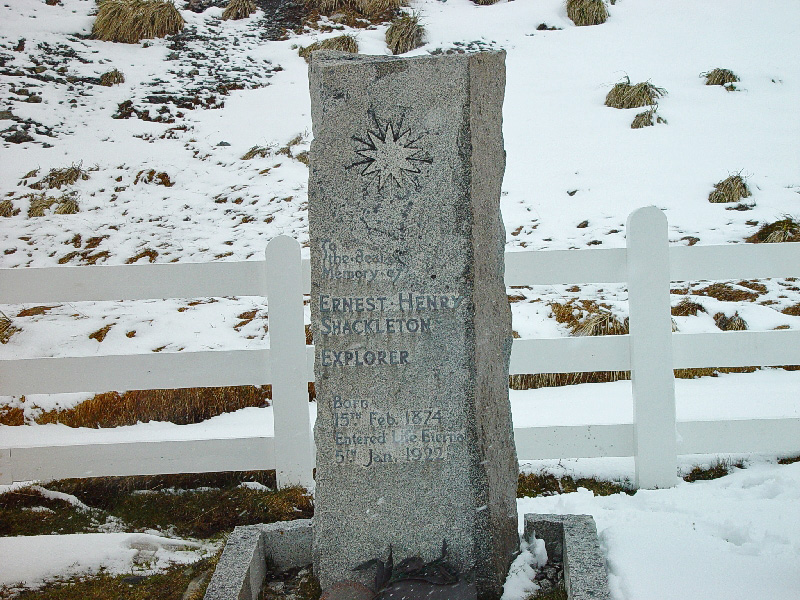
Shackleton's grave in Grytviken

Grytviken is closely associated with the explorer Sir Ernest Shackleton. Shackleton's Imperial Trans-Antarctic Expedition set out from London on 1 August 1914, to reach the Weddell Sea on 10 January 1915, where the pack ice closed in on their ship, Endurance. The ship was broken by the ice on 27 October 1915. The 28 crew members managed to flee to Elephant Island off Antarctica in three small boats. Shackleton and five other men managed to reach the southern coast of South Georgia in James Caird. They arrived at Cave Cove and camped at Peggotty Bluff, from whence they trekked to Stromness on the northeast coast. From Grytviken, Shackleton organised a rescue operation to bring home the remaining men.

He again returned to Grytviken during the Shackleton–Rowett Expedition and this is where he died, aged just 47, shortly after New Year's Day, prior to the expedition heading south to Antarctica. His widow chose South Georgia as his final resting place, so this is where he was buried. His grave is located south of Grytviken, alongside those of whalers who had died on the island.

On 27 November 2011, the ashes of Frank Wild, Shackleton's "right-hand man," were interred on the right side of Shackleton's grave-site. The inscription on the rough-hewn granite block set to mark the spot reads "Frank Wild 1873–1939, Shackleton's right-hand man." Wild's relatives and Shackleton's only granddaughter, Alexandra Shackleton, attended a service conducted by Richard Hines, rector of the Falkland Islands. The writer Angie Butler discovered the ashes in the vault of Braamfontein Cemetery, Johannesburg, while researching her book The Quest for Frank Wild. She said "His ashes will now be where they were always supposed to be. It just took them a long time getting there."

=== Falklands War ===
During the Falklands War, Grytviken was captured by Argentine forces in early April 1982 following a brief battle with Royal Marines. The Royal Marines, SAS and SBS retook the settlement three weeks later without a shot being fired in return.

Supported by the corvette ARA Guerrico on 3 April 1982, ARA Bahía Paraíso landed a party of Argentine marines who attacked the platoon of 22 Royal Marines deployed at Grytviken. The two-hour battle resulted in ARA Guerrico being damaged and an Argentine Puma helicopter shot down. The Argentine forces sustained three men killed and a similar number of wounded, with one wounded on the British side. The British commanding officer Lieutenant Keith Mills was awarded a Distinguished Service Cross for the defence of South Georgia.

While the British magistrate and other civilians and military present in Grytviken were removed from South Georgia, another 15 Britons remained beyond Argentine reach. The losses suffered at Grytviken prevented Argentina from occupying the rest of the island, with Bird Island base, and field camps at Schlieper Bay, Lyell Glacier and St. Andrew's Bay remaining under British control.

On 25 April, the Royal Navy damaged and captured the Argentine submarine ARA Santa Fe at South Georgia. The Argentine garrison in Grytviken surrendered without returning fire. The following day the detachment in Leith Harbour commanded by Captain Alfredo Astiz also surrendered. One prisoner, Felix Artuso, was shot when guards mistakenly believed he was trying to sabotage Santa Fe, and was buried at Grytviken Cemetery. The Argentine personnel were removed from the South Sandwich Islands by HMS Endurance on 20 June. Due to evidence of an unauthorised visit, the closed station Corbeta Uruguay was destroyed in January 1983.

=== Current situation ===
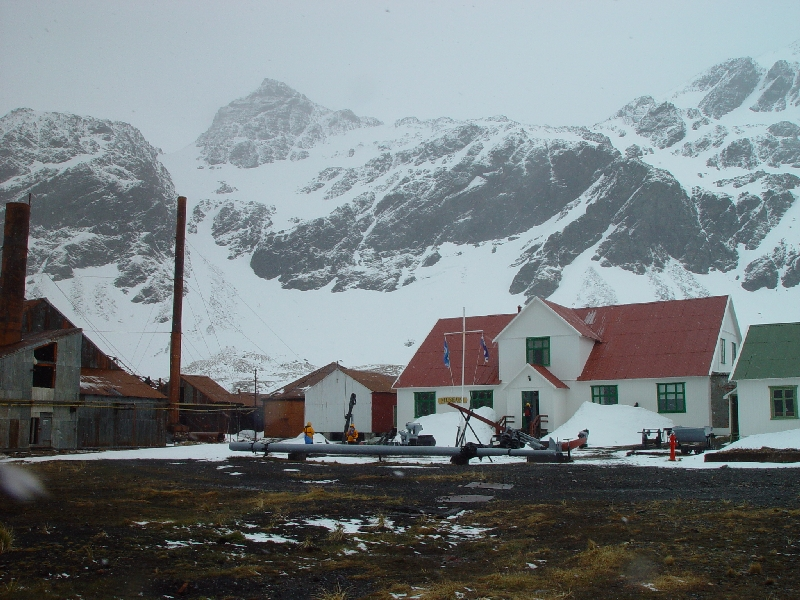
South Georgia Museum, Grytviken

Along with the surrounding area, the station has been declared an Area of Special Tourist Interest (ASTI).

Grytviken is a popular stop for cruise ships visiting Antarctica, and tourists usually land to visit Shackleton's grave. The South Georgia Museum is housed in the manager's house of the former whaling station, and is open during the summer tourist season.

The station's church is the only building which retains its original purpose; it is still used occasionally for services. There have been several marriages in Grytviken, the first being registered on 24 February 1932, between A.G.N. Jones and Vera Riches.

On 28 January 2007, a service was conducted in remembrance of Anders Hansen (a Norwegian whaler buried at Grytviken Cemetery in 1943) and to celebrate his great-great-grandson Axel Wattø Eide's baptism occurring in Oslo the same day.

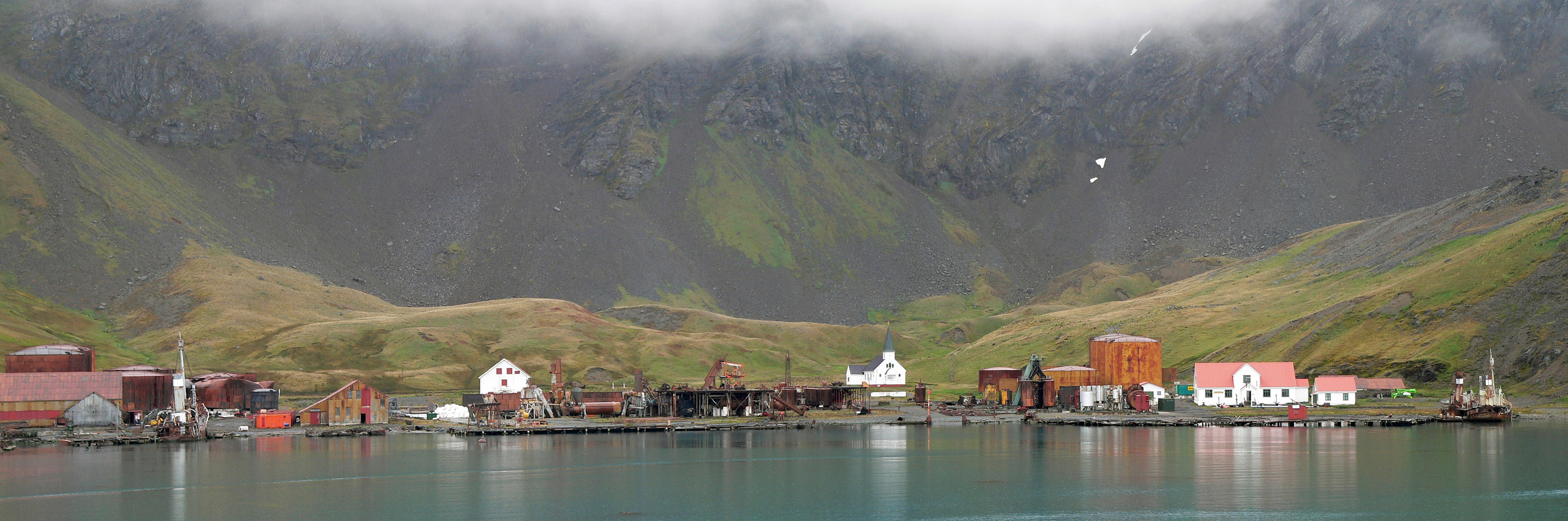
Panorama view of Grytviken

Multiple wrecks dot Grytviken, and its environs. The ships Petrel, Dias and Albatross were beached, and left to rust, after decades of service.

== Geography ==
=== Climate ===
Grytviken and King Edward Point have a tundra climate (Köppen ET) with long, cold winters and short, cool summers. The highest temperature ever recorded at Grytviken/King Edward Point was 28.8 °C (83.8 °F) on 10 March 1922.

Climate data for Grytviken/King Edward Point (1991–2020 normals, extremes 1922–2023)
| Month | Jan | Feb | Mar | Apr | May | Jun | Jul | Aug | Sep | Oct | Nov | Dec | Year |
|---|---|---|---|---|---|---|---|---|---|---|---|---|---|
| Record high °C (°F) | 22.8 (73.0) | 22.4 (72.3) | 28.8 (83.8) | 20.8 (69.4) | 17.6 (63.7) | 14.2 (57.6) | 14.9 (58.8) | 13.5 (56.3) | 15.5 (59.9) | 20.2 (68.4) | 20.4 (68.7) | 27.1 (80.8) | 28.8 (83.8) |
| Mean daily maximum °C (°F) | 10.3 (50.5) | 10.6 (51.1) | 9.3 (48.7) | 6.3 (43.3) | 3.6 (38.5) | 2.4 (36.3) | 1.8 (35.2) | 2.8 (37.0) | 4.8 (40.6) | 7.0 (44.6) | 8.8 (47.8) | 9.9 (49.8) | 6.5 (43.6) |
| Daily mean °C (°F) | 5.8 (42.4) | 6.1 (43.0) | 5.2 (41.4) | 2.6 (36.7) | 0.4 (32.7) | −0.4 (31.3) | −1.3 (29.7) | −0.7 (30.7) | 0.8 (33.4) | 2.8 (37.0) | 4.4 (39.9) | 5.4 (41.7) | 2.6 (36.7) |
| Mean daily minimum °C (°F) | 2.4 (36.3) | 2.6 (36.7) | 1.9 (35.4) | −0.2 (31.6) | −2.3 (27.9) | −3.1 (26.4) | −4.3 (24.3) | −3.7 (25.3) | −2.4 (27.7) | −0.8 (30.6) | 0.9 (33.6) | 2.1 (35.8) | −0.6 (31.0) |
| Record low °C (°F) | −2.1 (28.2) | −2.7 (27.1) | −3.7 (25.3) | −6.9 (19.6) | −9.8 (14.4) | −10.1 (13.8) | −15.1 (4.8) | −12.4 (9.7) | −10.9 (12.4) | −9.2 (15.4) | −5.6 (21.9) | −3.0 (26.6) | −15.1 (4.8) |
| Average precipitation mm (inches) | 92 (3.6) | 114 (4.5) | 136 (5.4) | 139 (5.5) | 137 (5.4) | 135 (5.3) | 149 (5.9) | 149 (5.9) | 92 (3.6) | 80 (3.1) | 93 (3.7) | 88 (3.5) | 1,394 (54.9) |
| Average precipitation days (≥ 0.1 mm) | 12 | 13 | 14 | 14 | 12 | 15 | 15 | 14 | 11 | 12 | 11 | 11 | 154 |
| Average relative humidity (%) | 72 | 69 | 69 | 70 | 74 | 75 | 74 | 73 | 72 | 70 | 69 | 71 | 72 |
| Mean monthly sunshine hours | 152 | 160 | 127 | 66 | 34 | 12 | 22 | 74 | 123 | 171 | 174 | 167 | 1,282 |
Source 1: Globalbioclimatics/Salvador Rivas-Martínez (precipitation 1901–1950) DMI/Danish Meteorology Institute (sun, humidity, and precipitation days 1931–1960) Météo Climat (extremes)
Source 2: Starlings Roost Weather

Climate data for Grytviken/King Edward Point (normals and extremes 1901–1950, sunshine 1931–1960)
| Month | Jan | Feb | Mar | Apr | May | Jun | Jul | Aug | Sep | Oct | Nov | Dec | Year |
|---|---|---|---|---|---|---|---|---|---|---|---|---|---|
| Record high °C (°F) | 24.5 (76.1) | 26.5 (79.7) | 28.8 (83.8) | 19.1 (66.4) | 17.5 (63.5) | 14.0 (57.2) | 13.6 (56.5) | 13.2 (55.8) | 17.0 (62.6) | 20.0 (68.0) | 22.5 (72.5) | 21.5 (70.7) | 28.8 (83.8) |
| Mean daily maximum °C (°F) | 8.4 (47.1) | 9.1 (48.4) | 8.4 (47.1) | 5.6 (42.1) | 2.9 (37.2) | 0.9 (33.6) | 1.2 (34.2) | 1.5 (34.7) | 3.5 (38.3) | 5.4 (41.7) | 6.5 (43.7) | 7.5 (45.5) | 5.1 (41.2) |
| Daily mean °C (°F) | 4.6 (40.3) | 5.1 (41.2) | 4.4 (39.9) | 2.3 (36.1) | 0.0 (32.0) | −1.6 (29.1) | −1.5 (29.3) | −1.8 (28.8) | −0.1 (31.8) | 1.6 (34.9) | 2.7 (36.9) | 3.7 (38.7) | 1.6 (34.9) |
| Mean daily minimum °C (°F) | 1.4 (34.5) | 1.7 (35.1) | 1.0 (33.8) | −0.8 (30.6) | −3.1 (26.4) | −4.6 (23.7) | −4.7 (23.5) | −4.9 (23.2) | −3.3 (26.1) | −1.8 (28.8) | −0.5 (31.1) | 0.4 (32.7) | −1.6 (29.1) |
| Record low °C (°F) | −4.1 (24.6) | −3.7 (25.3) | −6.3 (20.7) | −9.8 (14.4) | −11.4 (11.5) | −14.6 (5.7) | −15.2 (4.6) | −19.2 (−2.6) | −18.4 (−1.1) | −11 (12) | −6.4 (20.5) | −5.4 (22.3) | −19.2 (−2.6) |
| Average precipitation mm (inches) | 92 (3.6) | 114 (4.5) | 136 (5.4) | 139 (5.5) | 137 (5.4) | 135 (5.3) | 149 (5.9) | 149 (5.9) | 92 (3.6) | 80 (3.1) | 93 (3.7) | 88 (3.5) | 1,394 (54.9) |
| Average precipitation days (≥ 0.1 mm) | 12 | 13 | 14 | 14 | 12 | 15 | 15 | 14 | 11 | 12 | 11 | 11 | 154 |
| Average relative humidity (%) | 72 | 69 | 69 | 70 | 74 | 75 | 74 | 73 | 72 | 70 | 69 | 71 | 72 |
| Mean monthly sunshine hours | 152 | 160 | 127 | 66 | 34 | 12 | 22 | 74 | 123 | 171 | 174 | 167 | 1,282 |
Source 1: Globalbioclimatics/Salvador Rivas-Martínez
Source 2: DMI/Danish Meteorology Institute (sun, humidity, and precipitation days 1931–1960)

== Gallery ==
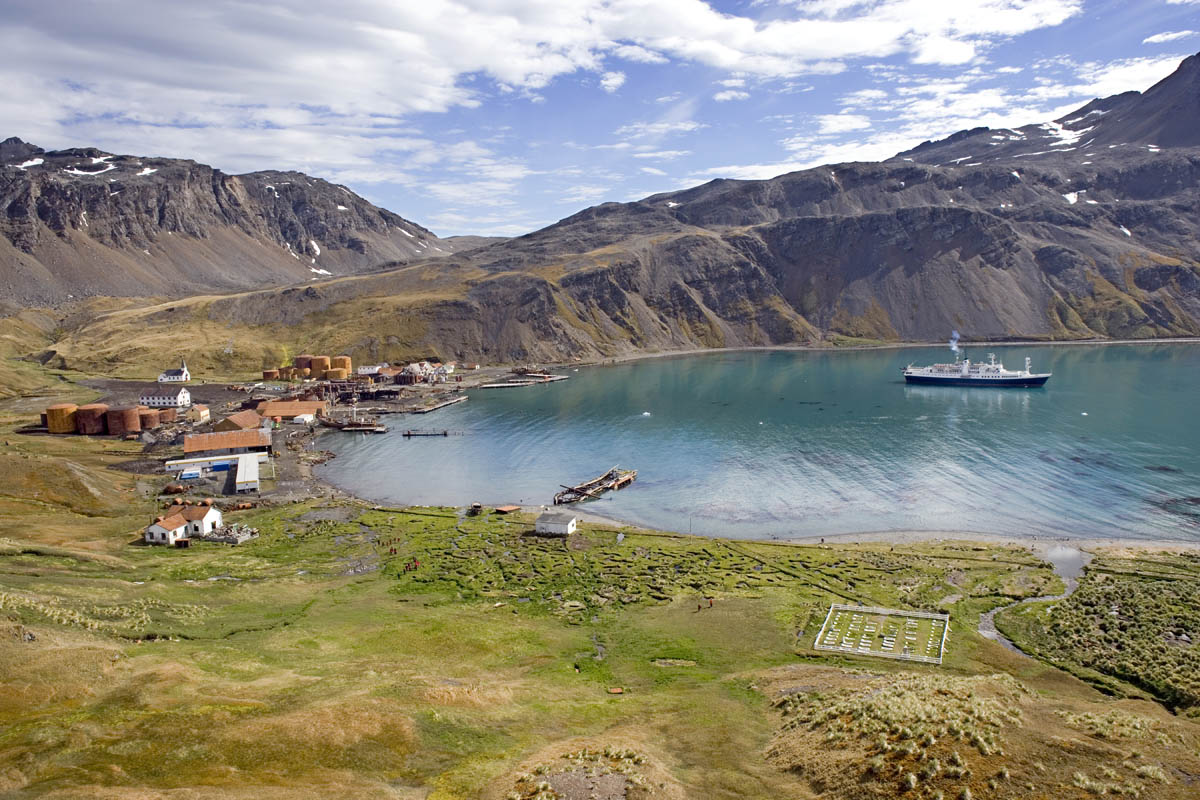
Grytviken Harbour, showing the whaling station, church and cemetery with Shackleton's grave

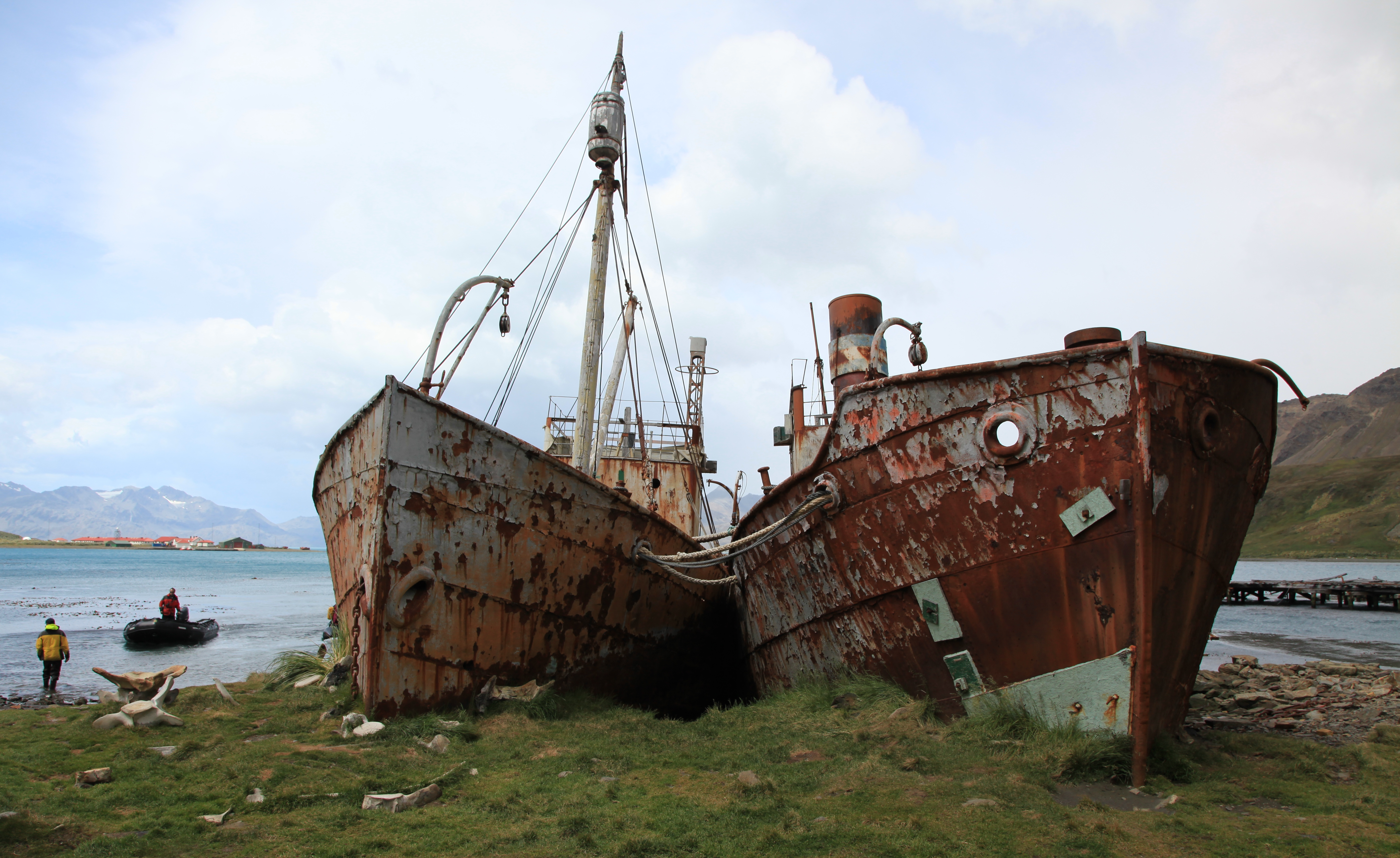
Whaling and sealing ships at Grytviken

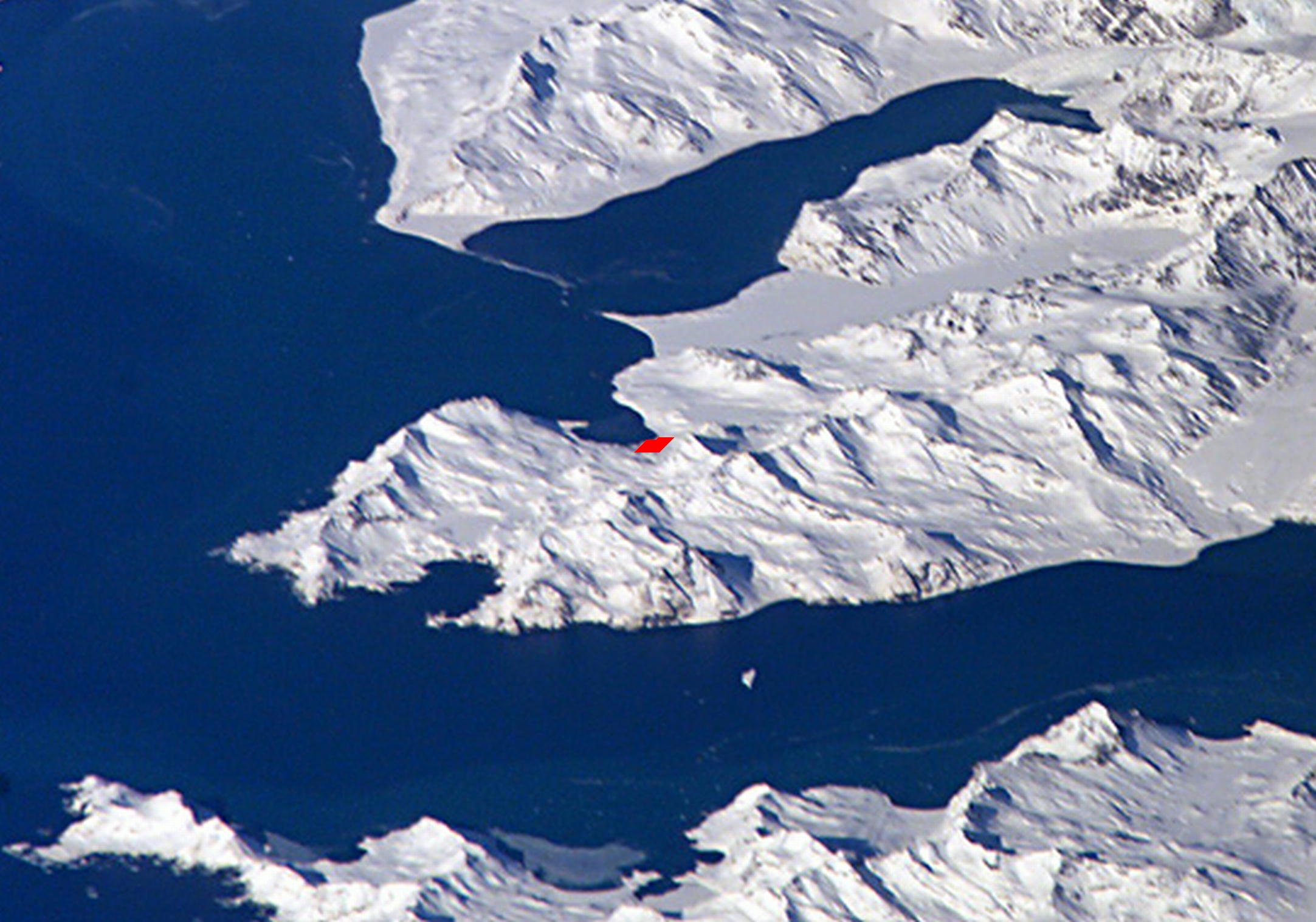
Thatcher Peninsula with King Edward Cove and Grytviken

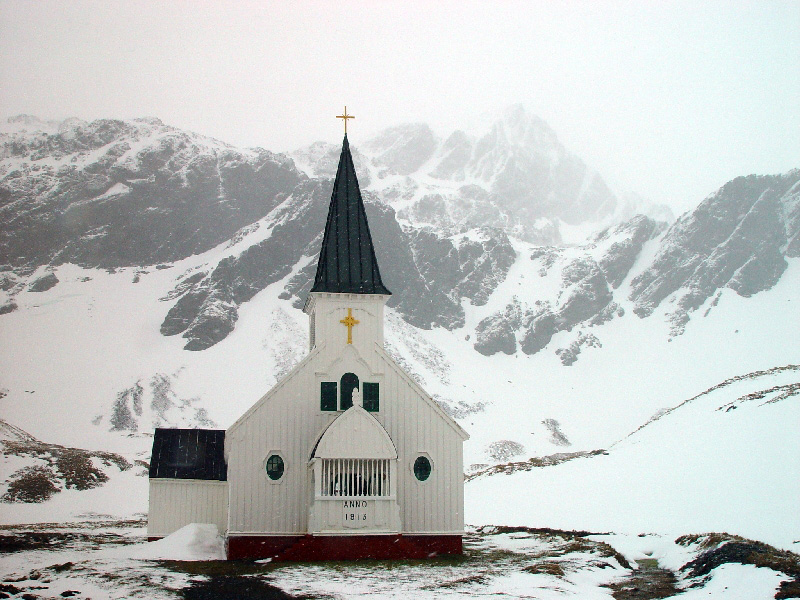
The Norwegian Church in Grytviken (built in 1913)

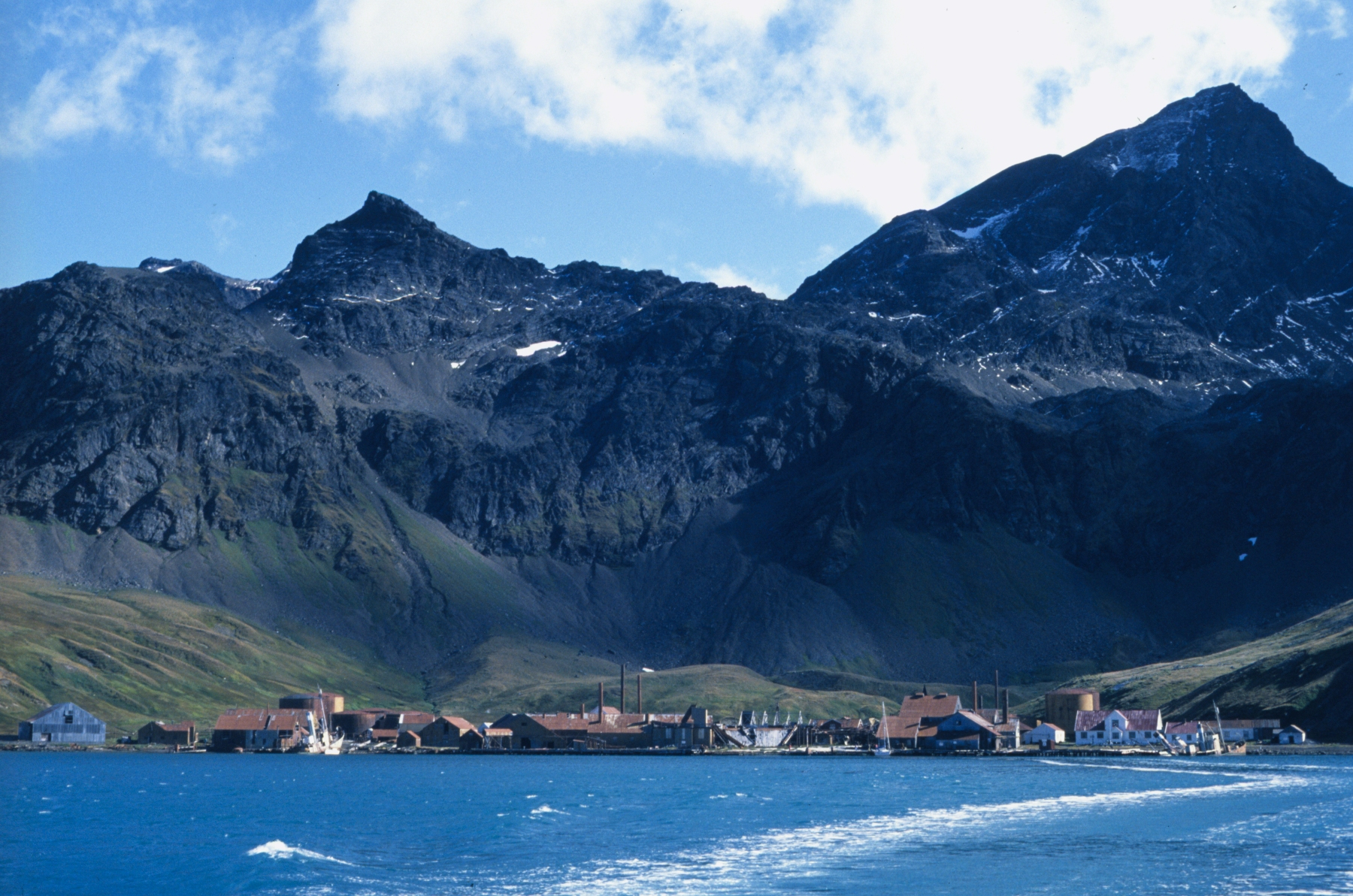
Grytviken's abandoned whaling station

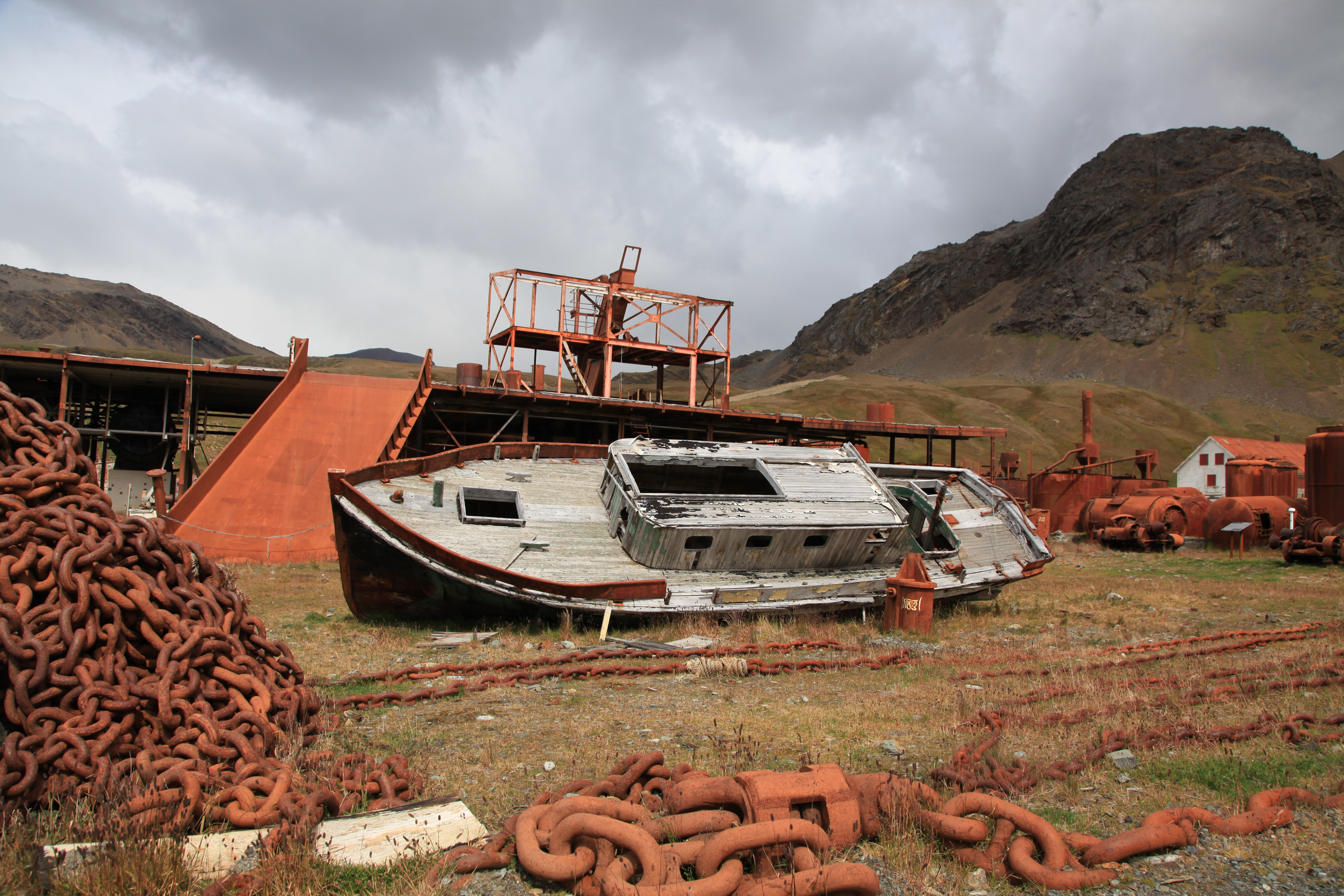
Abandoned buildings at Grytviken

== See also ==
- History of South Georgia and the South Sandwich Islands
- King Edward Point
- South Georgia Museum
- Carl Anton Larsen
- Viktor Esbensen
- Solveig Gunbjørg Jacobsen
