= Compañía Argentina de Pesca =

Whaling business

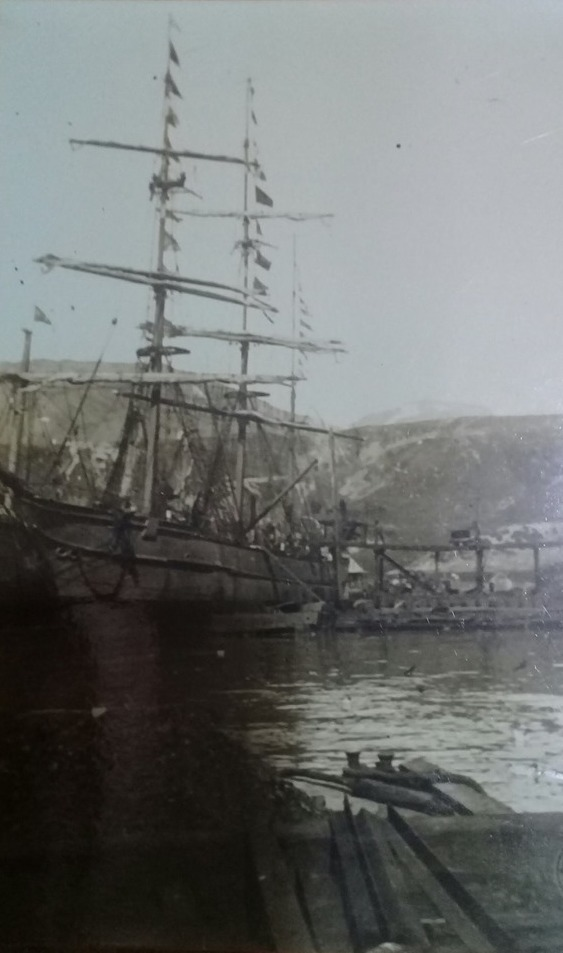
Sail ship 'Tijuca' of the Compañía Argentina de Pesca, in Grytviken, being loaded manually via a Decauville railway.

Compañía Argentina de Pesca (English: Argentine Fishing Company) was initiated by the British-Norwegian whaler and Antarctic explorer Carl A. Larsen, and established on 29 February 1904 by three foreign residents of Buenos Aires: the Norwegian consul P. Christophersen, H.H. Schlieper (US national), and E. Tornquist (a Swedish banker). Larsen was the company's Manager, in which capacity he organized the building of Grytviken, the first land-based whaling station in Antarctica put into operation on 24 December 1904.

Compañía Argentina de Pesca applied for a British whaling leases at the British Legation in Buenos Aires; the application was filed by the company's president Christophersen and Captain Guillermo Núñez, a technical advisor and shareholder in the company who was also Director of Armaments of the Argentine Navy. The lease was granted by the Governor of the Falkland Islands and Dependencies on 1 January 1906, and subsequently renewed.

In 1960 Compañía Argentina de Pesca ceased its operations on South Georgia, selling the Grytviken whaling station to Albion Star (South Georgia) Ltd. (Falkland Islands).

== See also ==
- History of South Georgia and the South Sandwich Islands
- Sovereignty of South Georgia and the South Sandwich Islands
- Grytviken
- Carl Anton Larsen
- Viktor Esbensen
