= Gasolina (disambiguation) =

"Gasolina" is a 2004 single by Daddy Yankee.

Gasolina may also refer to:

== Film and TV ==
- Gasolina (film), Guatemalan film

== Music ==
- "Gasolina", a 2007 song by Bonde Do Rolê from With Lasers
- "Gasolina", a 2023 song by Paula Fernandes from 11:11
- "Gasolina", a 2004 song by Rojo from Día de Independencia

== See also ==
- Gasoline (disambiguation)
