= Petrol (disambiguation) =

Petrol is short for petroleum spirit, also known as gasoline.

Petrol may also refer to:

- Petroleum
- "Petrol" (song), by the Brit-pop band Ash (1994)
- Petrol AD, an oil company of Bulgaria
- Petrol Group or Petrol d.d., an oil company of Slovenia
- Petrol (film), a 2022 Australian film

== See also ==
- Patrol (disambiguation)
- Petrel (disambiguation)
- Petroleum (disambiguation)
