= Petrel (disambiguation) =

Petrel can refer to

- Petrel, a type of tube-nosed seabird
- The order Procellariiformes as a whole, including the true petrels and relatives

== Aviation and rocketry ==
- Percival Petrel, a 1930s British communications aircraft
- Petrel (rocket), a British sounding rocket
- AUM-N-2 Petrel, an antisubmarine missile used by the U.S. Navy in the 1950s, later designated AQM-41A as a target drone

== Ships ==
- USS Petrel, a name used by four United States Navy ships
- HMS Peterel, an archaic form of "Petrel" used as a name by seven Royal Navy ships
- MV Petrel, a United States Bureau of Fisheries patrol boat in service from 1919 to 1934 that previously served in the United States Navy as USS Cobra (SP-626)
- RV Petrel, a research vessel
- Petrel (ship, 1928), a whaler, built in Oslo, left to rust after being beached in Grytviken, South Georgia

== Geographic locations ==
- Petrel Base, an Argentine base in Antarctica
- Petrel Island (disambiguation)
- San Antonio de Petrel, a town in Chile
- Petrel, an alternate spelling for the town of Petrer in Alicante, Spain

== Other uses ==
- Petrel (reservoir software), petroleum reservoir software
- Petrel (maxace knives), MaxAce Knives "Petrel" balisong knife
