= Petrel (1928 ship) =

Whaler built in 1928

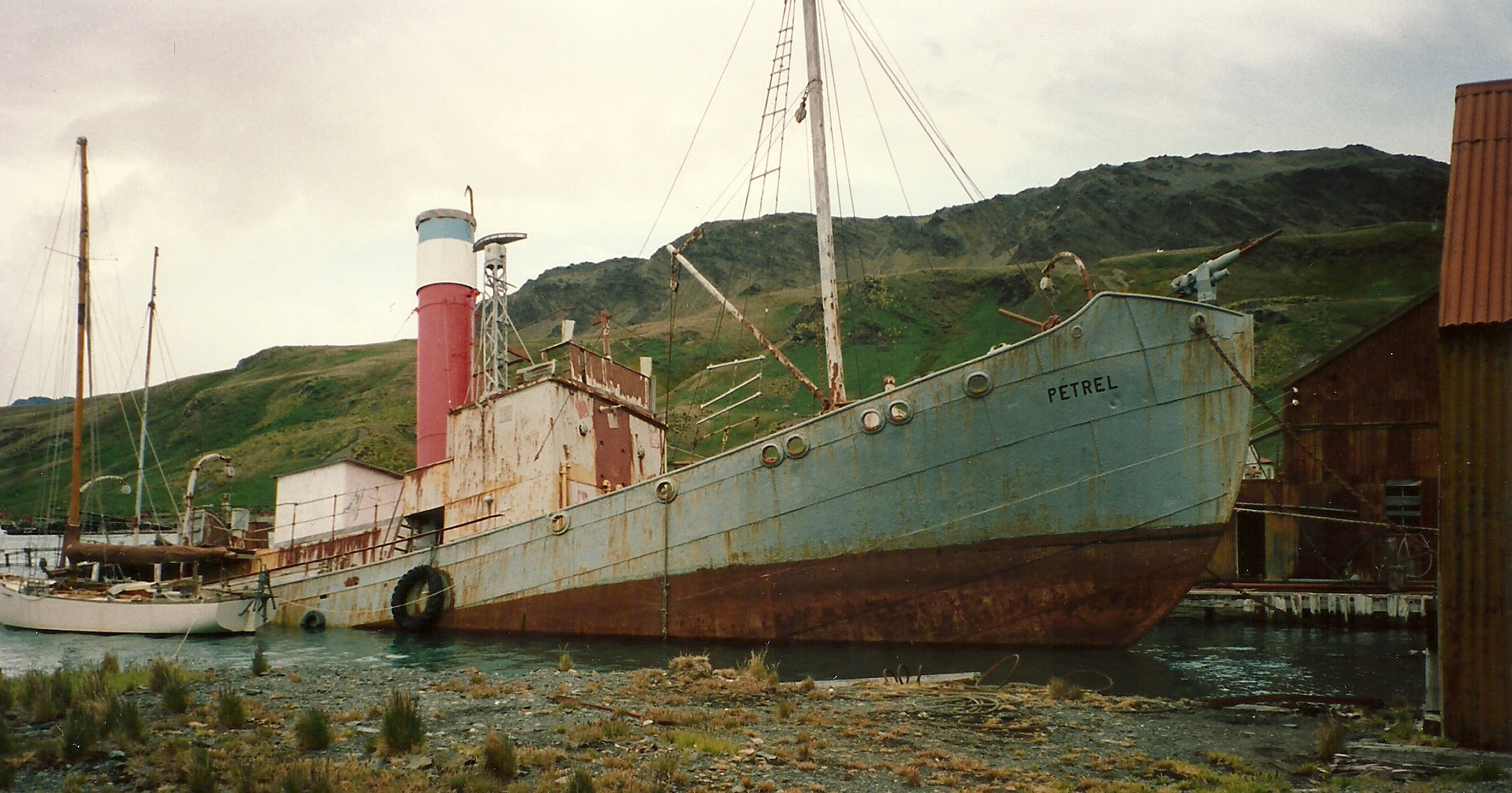
- Petrel beached in Grytviken, South Georgia

History
- Name: Petrel
- Builder: Oslo, Norway
- Completed: 1928
- Status: Derelict

General characteristics
- Type: Whaling ship
- Tonnage: 245 GRT
- Length: 35.1 m (115 ft 2 in)

Petrel was a whaler, built in Oslo, in 1928, in operation in the waters around Antarctica for over three decades.

She was steam-powered, and displaced just 245 tons. She was one of the first whalers built with a walkway connecting the bridge with her harpoon-cannon mounted in her bows.

In 1957, like other ships in the South Georgia whaling fleet, she was adapted to harvesting seals from the beaches where they raised their young. After serving as a sealing vessel Petrel was beached in Grytviken, South Georgia. According to Robert Headland's "Island of South Georgia", there was a proposal to salvage and restore Petrel in 1983.
