= King Edward Point =

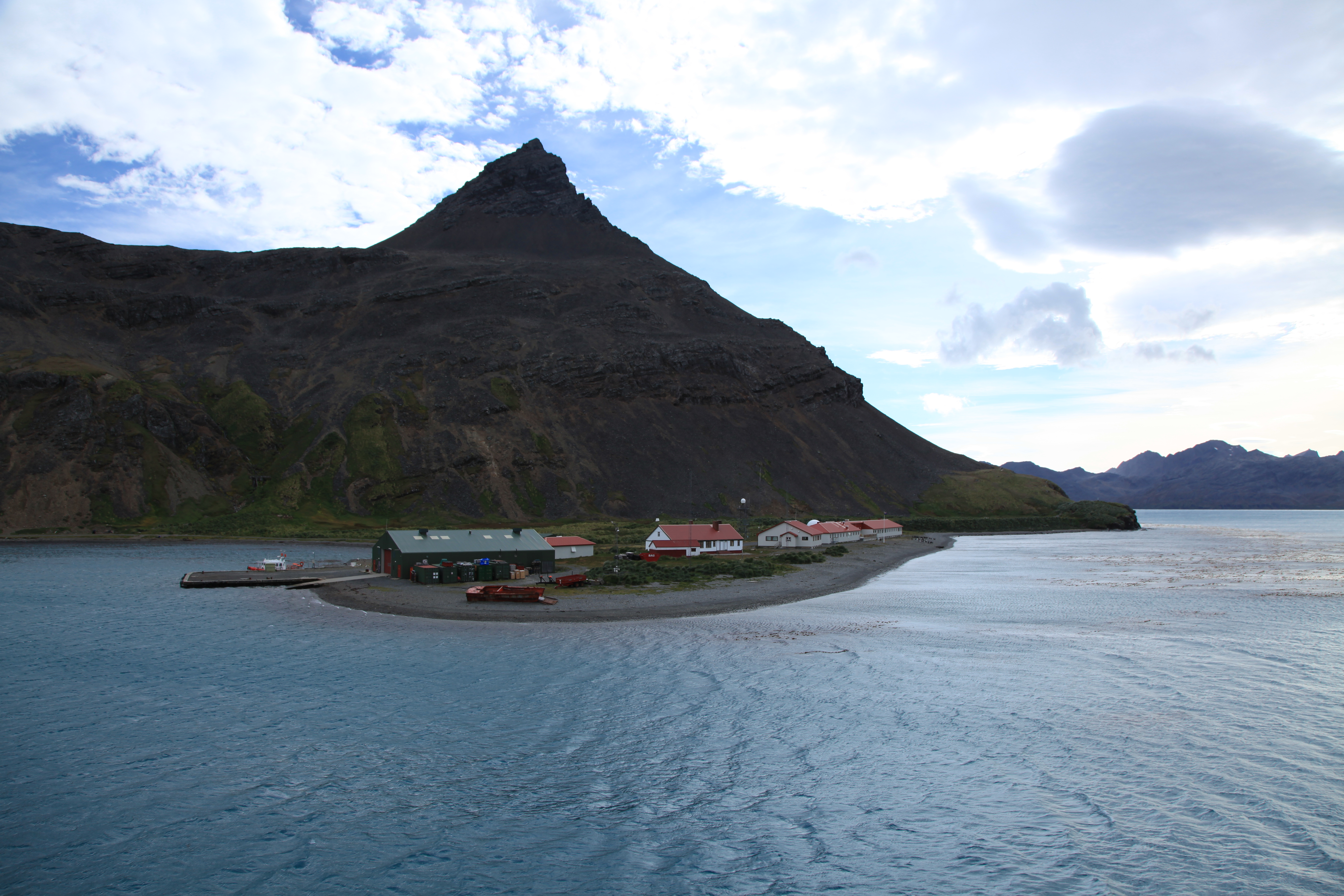
- King Edward Point

- Location of King Edward Point and Grytviken in South Georgia

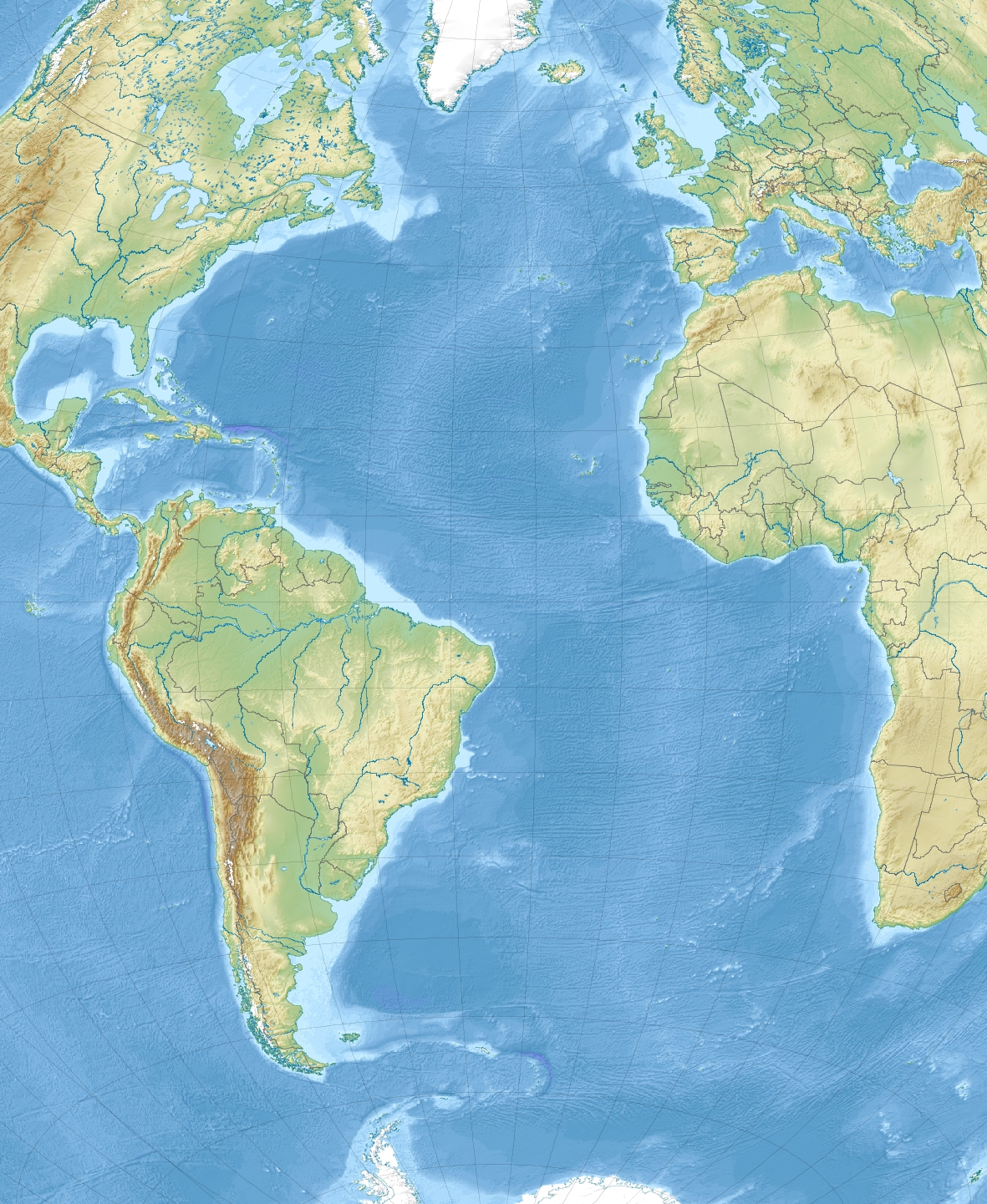
- Location within Atlantic Ocean
- Coordinates: 54°17′00″S 36°29′42″W
- Country: United Kingdom
- Territory: South Georgia and the South Sandwich Islands
- Operator: British Antarctic Survey
- Established: 1950

Population (2018)
  - Summer: 22
  - Winter: 12
- Time zone: UTC−02:00 (GST)
- UN/LOCODE: GS
- Active times: All year-round
- Status: Operational
- Activities: Support sustainable fishing

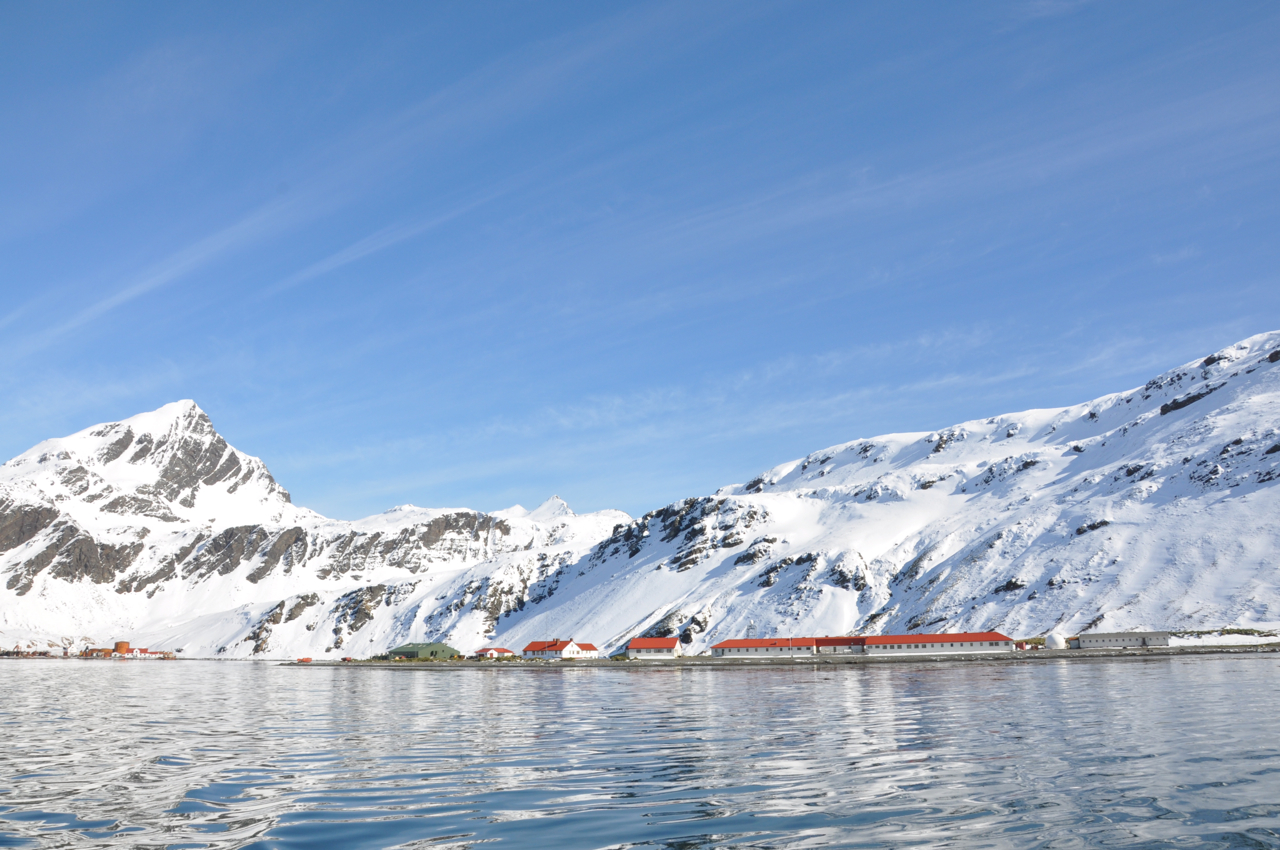
Southeast view from Cumberland East Bay, with Grytviken in the left background

King Edward Point (also known as KEP) is a permanent British Antarctic Survey research station on South Georgia island and is the capital of the British Overseas Territory of South Georgia and the South Sandwich Islands. It is situated in Cumberland East Bay on the northeastern coast of the island. The settlement is the second smallest capital in the world by population, after Ngerulmud in Palau.

== History ==
King Edward Point was named in honour of King Edward VII. Grytviken (pot cove in Norwegian and Swedish) is nearby and was named after sealers' trywork. Both of these are along the King Edward Cove.

The Post Office in King Edward Point was established in 1909, and has been in operation since then with the exception of the Falklands War. The oldest building in King Edward Point is the customs warehouse and jail built in 1914.

Discovery House, a prefabricated laboratory, was established in 1925, and used by biologists collecting specimens from whale carcasses for six years. In 1929, Discovery II was opened for use in oceanographic study.

Argentine soldiers arrived near King Edward Point on 24 March 1982, and occupied it on 3 April. The British retook King Edward Point in late April.

== Environment ==
Elephant and fur seals inhabit the area. Cats were brought to King Edward Point, but the last one died in 1980.

== Climate ==
King Edward Point and Grytviken have a tundra climate (Köppen ET) with long, cold winters and short, cool summers. The highest temperature ever recorded at Grytviken/King Edward Point was 28.8 °C (83.8 °F) on 10 March 1922.

Climate data for Grytviken/King Edward Point (normals and extremes 2006–2020)
| Month | Jan | Feb | Mar | Apr | May | Jun | Jul | Aug | Sep | Oct | Nov | Dec | Year |
|---|---|---|---|---|---|---|---|---|---|---|---|---|---|
| Record high °C (°F) | 23.0 (73.4) | 23.0 (73.4) | 21.6 (70.9) | 21.7 (71.1) | 17.1 (62.8) | 14.1 (57.4) | 14.9 (58.8) | 13.9 (57.0) | 16.0 (60.8) | 20.2 (68.4) | 20.4 (68.7) | 26.4 (79.5) | 26.4 (79.5) |
| Mean daily maximum °C (°F) | 10.0 (50.0) | 10.8 (51.4) | 9.4 (48.9) | 6.1 (43.0) | 3.9 (39.0) | 2.2 (36.0) | 1.7 (35.1) | 2.4 (36.3) | 4.5 (40.1) | 6.9 (44.4) | 8.9 (48.0) | 9.8 (49.6) | 6.4 (43.5) |
| Daily mean °C (°F) | 6.3 (43.3) | 6.9 (44.4) | 5.8 (42.4) | 3.2 (37.8) | 1.0 (33.8) | −0.4 (31.3) | −1.2 (29.8) | −0.6 (30.9) | 1.1 (34.0) | 3.3 (37.9) | 5.0 (41.0) | 6.1 (43.0) | 3.0 (37.5) |
| Mean daily minimum °C (°F) | 2.6 (36.7) | 3.1 (37.6) | 2.2 (36.0) | 0.2 (32.4) | −2.0 (28.4) | −4.6 (23.7) | −4.0 (24.8) | −3.7 (25.3) | −2.3 (27.9) | −0.3 (31.5) | 1.0 (33.8) | 2.3 (36.1) | −0.5 (31.2) |
| Record low °C (°F) | −2.5 (27.5) | −3.0 (26.6) | −4.0 (24.8) | −7.0 (19.4) | −10.0 (14.0) | −11.2 (11.8) | −15.1 (4.8) | −13.0 (8.6) | −11.0 (12.2) | −9.5 (14.9) | −5.0 (23.0) | −4.0 (24.8) | −15.1 (4.8) |
| Average precipitation mm (inches) | 92 (3.6) | 114 (4.5) | 136 (5.4) | 139 (5.5) | 137 (5.4) | 135 (5.3) | 149 (5.9) | 149 (5.9) | 92 (3.6) | 80 (3.1) | 93 (3.7) | 88 (3.5) | 1,394 (54.9) |
| Average precipitation days (≥ 0.1 mm) | 12 | 13 | 14 | 14 | 12 | 15 | 15 | 14 | 11 | 12 | 11 | 11 | 154 |
| Average relative humidity (%) | 72 | 69 | 69 | 70 | 74 | 75 | 74 | 73 | 72 | 70 | 69 | 71 | 72 |
| Mean monthly sunshine hours | 152 | 160 | 127 | 66 | 34 | 12 | 22 | 74 | 123 | 171 | 174 | 167 | 1,282 |
Source 1: Meteomanz
Source 2: Globalbioclimatics/Salvador Rivas-Martínez (precipitation 1901–1950) DMI/Danish Meteorology Institute (sun, humidity, and precipitation days 1931–1960) Météo Climat (extremes)

Climate data for Grytviken/King Edward Point (normals and extremes 1901–1950, sunshine 1931–1960)
| Month | Jan | Feb | Mar | Apr | May | Jun | Jul | Aug | Sep | Oct | Nov | Dec | Year |
|---|---|---|---|---|---|---|---|---|---|---|---|---|---|
| Record high °C (°F) | 24.5 (76.1) | 26.5 (79.7) | 28.8 (83.8) | 19.1 (66.4) | 17.5 (63.5) | 14.0 (57.2) | 13.6 (56.5) | 13.2 (55.8) | 17.0 (62.6) | 20.0 (68.0) | 22.5 (72.5) | 21.5 (70.7) | 28.8 (83.8) |
| Mean daily maximum °C (°F) | 8.4 (47.1) | 9.1 (48.4) | 8.4 (47.1) | 5.6 (42.1) | 2.9 (37.2) | 0.9 (33.6) | 1.2 (34.2) | 1.5 (34.7) | 3.5 (38.3) | 5.4 (41.7) | 6.5 (43.7) | 7.5 (45.5) | 5.1 (41.2) |
| Daily mean °C (°F) | 4.6 (40.3) | 5.1 (41.2) | 4.4 (39.9) | 2.3 (36.1) | 0.0 (32.0) | −1.6 (29.1) | −1.5 (29.3) | −1.8 (28.8) | −0.1 (31.8) | 1.6 (34.9) | 2.7 (36.9) | 3.7 (38.7) | 1.6 (34.9) |
| Mean daily minimum °C (°F) | 1.4 (34.5) | 1.7 (35.1) | 1.0 (33.8) | −0.8 (30.6) | −3.1 (26.4) | −4.6 (23.7) | −4.7 (23.5) | −4.9 (23.2) | −3.3 (26.1) | −1.8 (28.8) | −0.5 (31.1) | 0.4 (32.7) | −1.6 (29.1) |
| Record low °C (°F) | −4.1 (24.6) | −3.7 (25.3) | −6.3 (20.7) | −9.8 (14.4) | −11.4 (11.5) | −14.6 (5.7) | −15.2 (4.6) | −19.2 (−2.6) | −18.4 (−1.1) | −11 (12) | −6.4 (20.5) | −5.4 (22.3) | −19.2 (−2.6) |
| Average precipitation mm (inches) | 92 (3.6) | 114 (4.5) | 136 (5.4) | 139 (5.5) | 137 (5.4) | 135 (5.3) | 149 (5.9) | 149 (5.9) | 92 (3.6) | 80 (3.1) | 93 (3.7) | 88 (3.5) | 1,394 (54.9) |
| Average precipitation days (≥ 0.1 mm) | 12 | 13 | 14 | 14 | 12 | 15 | 15 | 14 | 11 | 12 | 11 | 11 | 154 |
| Average relative humidity (%) | 72 | 69 | 69 | 70 | 74 | 75 | 74 | 73 | 72 | 70 | 69 | 71 | 72 |
| Mean monthly sunshine hours | 152 | 160 | 127 | 66 | 34 | 12 | 22 | 74 | 123 | 171 | 174 | 167 | 1,282 |
Source 1: Globalbioclimatics/Salvador Rivas-Martínez
Source 2: DMI/Danish Meteorology Institute (sun, humidity, and precipitation days 1931–1960)

== See also ==
- List of Antarctic research stations
- List of Antarctic field camps

== Works cited ==
- Burton, Richard, ed. (2012). A Field Guide to the Wildlife of South Georgia. Princeton University Press.
- Poncet, Sally; Crosbie, Kim (2012). A Visitor's Guide to South Georgia (2 ed.). Princeton University Press. ISBN 9780691156583.
