= Gasoline (magazine) =

Canadian quarterly rock music magazine

Gasoline was a Canadian quarterly rock music magazine based out of Toronto, Ontario. The magazine was first published in May 2003. It is affiliated with the bar Bovine Sex Club in Toronto and has interviewed a variety of bands and artists from all over the world. Gasoline is available in major cities across Canada.
