= Gasoline, Texas =

- Ghost town
- Location within Texas Location within the United States
- Coordinates: 34°20′33″N 101°00′42″W
- Country: United States
- State: Texas
- County: Briscoe
- Established: 1907
- Became ghost town: 1948
- Time zone: UTC-6 (Central (CST))
  - Summer (DST): UTC-5 (CDT)

Gasoline is a ghost town in Briscoe County, Texas, United States.

A post office called Gasoline was established in 1907, and remained in operation until 1948. The community was named after a gasoline-powered cotton gin near the original town site.
