= Norwegian Anglican Church, Grytviken =

Church in Grytviken, South Georgia

Coordinates: 54°16′48″S 36°30′37″W

Norwegian Anglican Church (Whalers’ Church) in Grytviken
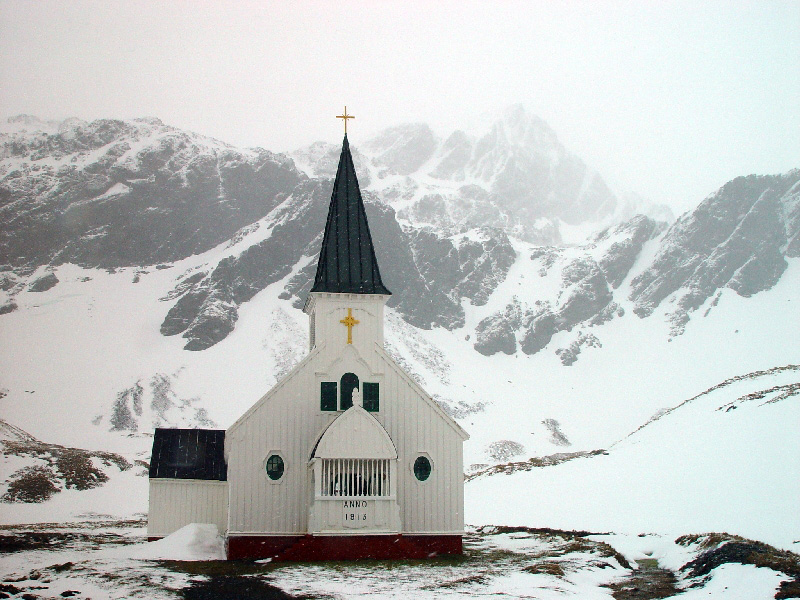
- The Church in Grytviken, in 2004
- Norwegian Anglican Church (Whalers’ Church) in Grytviken
- Location: Grytviken, South Georgia, South Georgia and the South Sandwich Islands
- Denomination: Church of England
- Previous denomination: Church of Norway (1913–2013)

History
- Dedication: 25 December 1913

Architecture
- Years built: 1913

Administration
- Province: Extra-provincial
- Diocese: Falkland Islands

Clergy
- Priest: Rev. Kristen Løken (1885–1975) 1913–1914

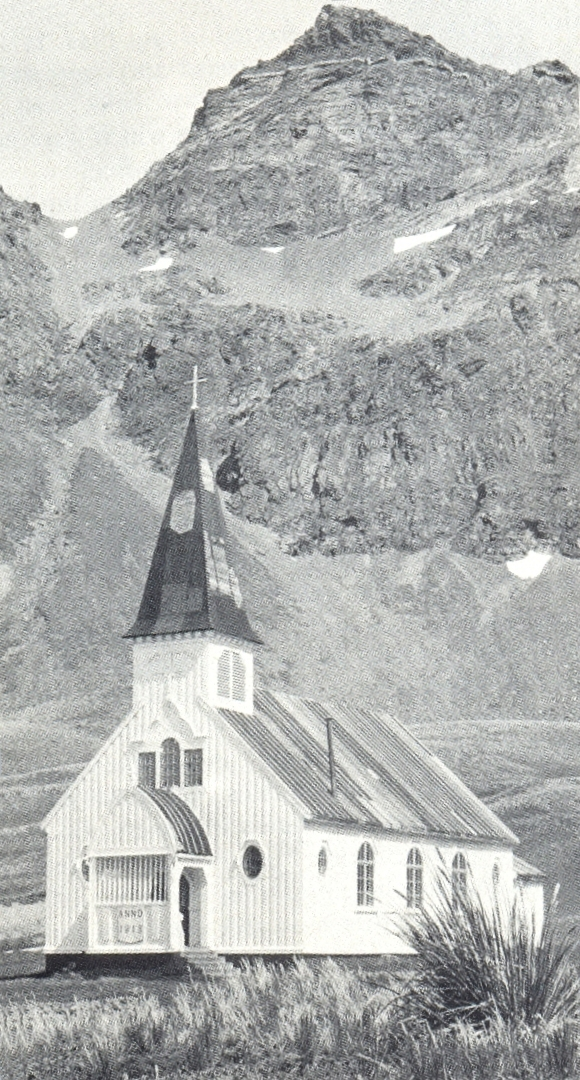
Church c. 1915

The Norwegian Anglican Church, sometimes known as the Whalers Church, and as the Norwegian Lutheran Church (until 2013), and casually as the Grytviken Church, is a church in Grytviken, South Georgia, built in 1913. The church was part of the Church of Norway for a century, from 1913 to 2013. It was formally handed over to the Church of England (national church of England) in 2013, and is now part of the Anglican Communion's Diocese of the Falkland Islands.

== History and architecture ==
The Neo-Gothic church was pre-built in Norway and erected in Grytviken by whalers led by Carl Anton Larsen around 1912–1913. The church consists of a single nave leading to a small altar. A small library is attached to the side near the altar. Inside, worshippers (and now visitors) are seated on long wood benches. The floor's dark wood planks contrast with the white walls and ceiling.

The church, one of the world's southernmost churches, was consecrated on Christmas Day in 1913. In 1922, a funeral service for Sir Ernest Shackleton was conducted in the church before his burial amongst 64 others in the church cemetery. The cemetery, located approximately 700 metres (2,300 ft) to the south on the other end of Grytviken Harbour, also holds empty graves for whalers lost at sea.

== Pastor ==
The church was led by Kristen Løken, from 1913 to 1914. Løken was born in 1885 in Lillehammer in Norway. He was made Pastor of South Georgia, and arrived in 1912 to take up his post. He was responsible for supervising the building of the church building, and left his church in 1914, and was the only pastor for this church. He died in 1975.

== Grytviken Cemetery ==
The Grytviken Cemetery, associated with the church, is located about 700 metres (2,300 ft) away to the south. It predates the church, first accepting whalers' graves before 1902. It holds 64 graves, including nine victims of a 1912 typhoid epidemic, Sir Ernest Shackleton (1874–1922), the ashes of fellow polar explorer Frank Wild (1873–1939) which were interred in 2011, and Félix Artuso, an Argentinian submarine officer who was killed in the 1982 British recapture of South Georgia from Argentina.

== Restoration and maintenance ==
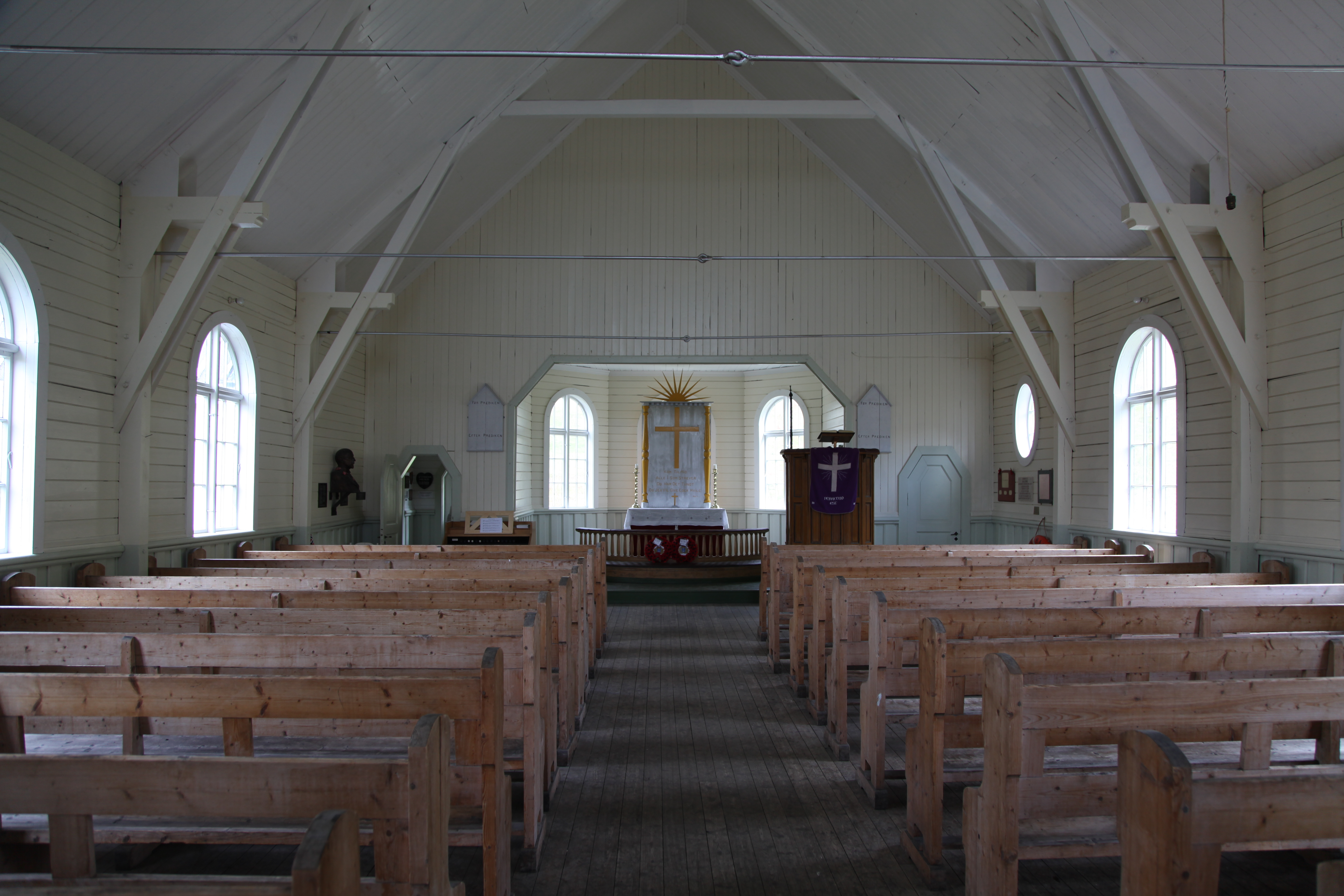
Church Interior in 2011

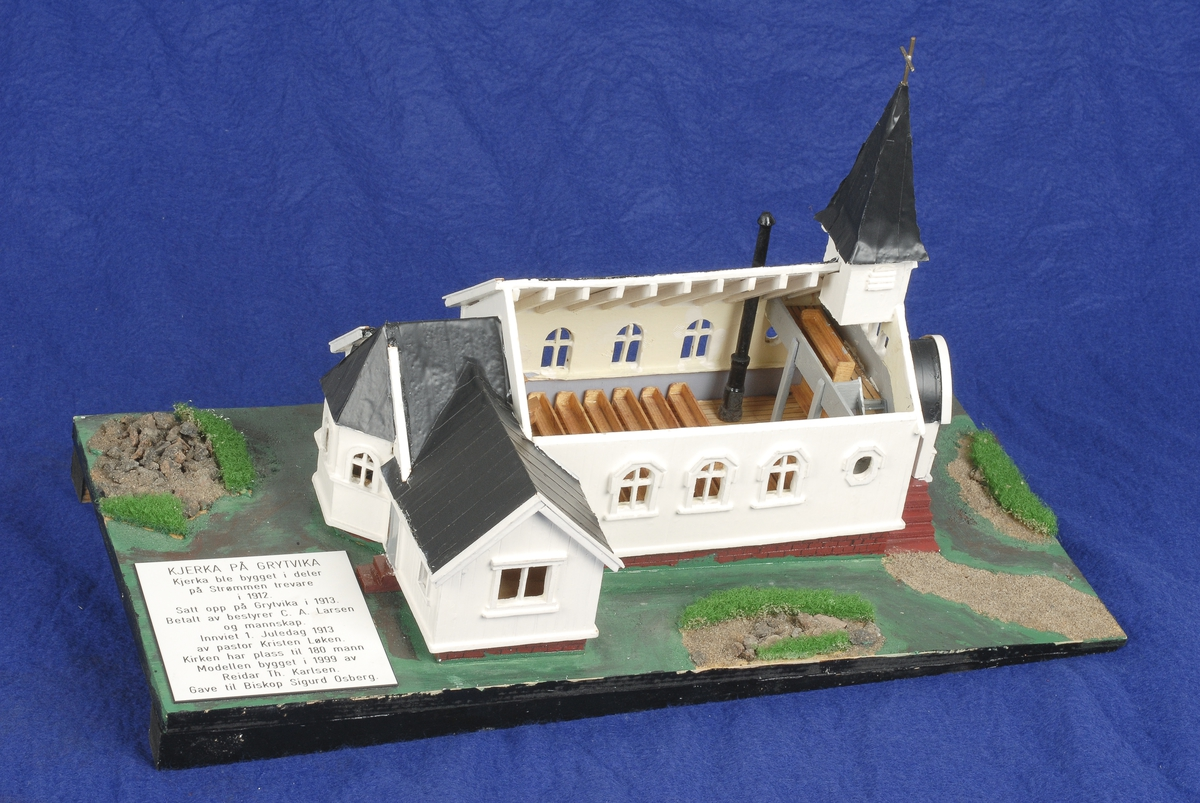
Model of church on display at Sandefjord Museum in Norway

In April 1982, during the invasion of South Georgia by Argentinian military forces, members of a British Antarctic Survey team were invited by some Royal Marines to take shelter in the church.

After years of abandonment and weathering, the harsh elements of the region (the roof was damaged in 1994), the church was renovated by the keepers of South Georgia Museum and volunteers in 1996–1998, and now serves for occasional church services and marriage ceremonies.

== See also ==
- Trinity Church (Antarctica) located south of Grytviken in Antarctica
- South Georgia Museum – one of a few active structures in town
- Løken Pond – named for the church's only pastor
