= List of beaches in the United Kingdom =

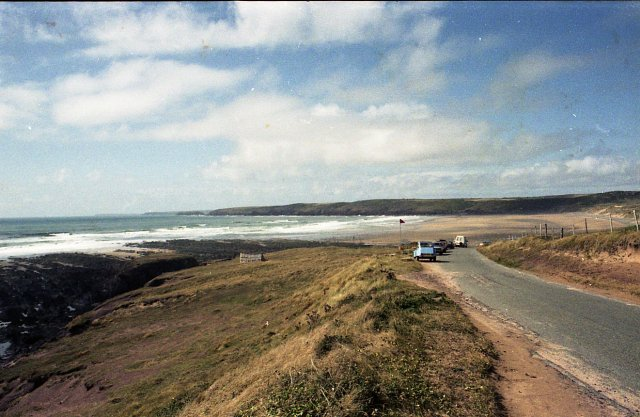
Little Furznip, Freshwater West, West Wales in July 1984

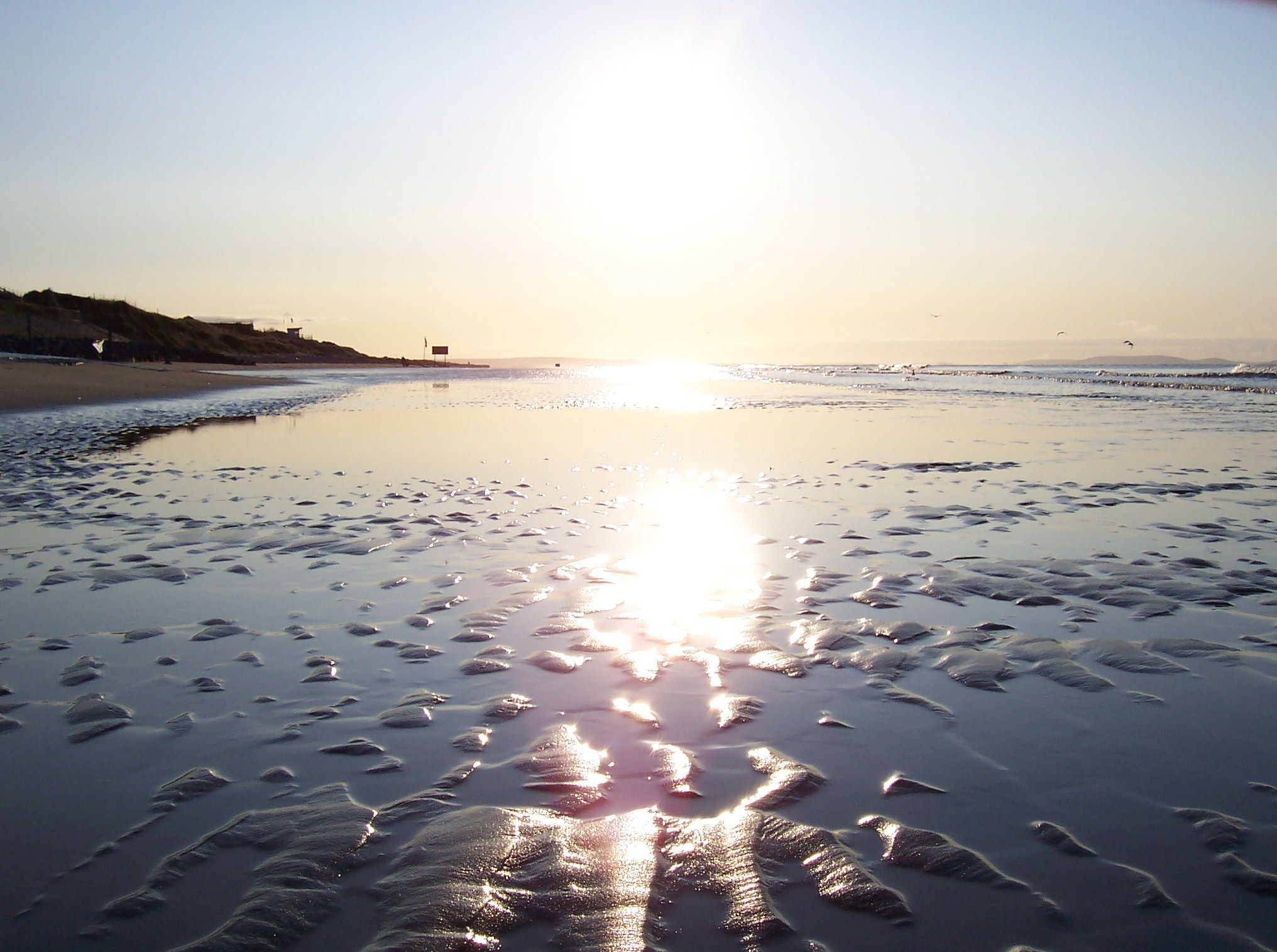
Pendine Sands in 2008, Wales

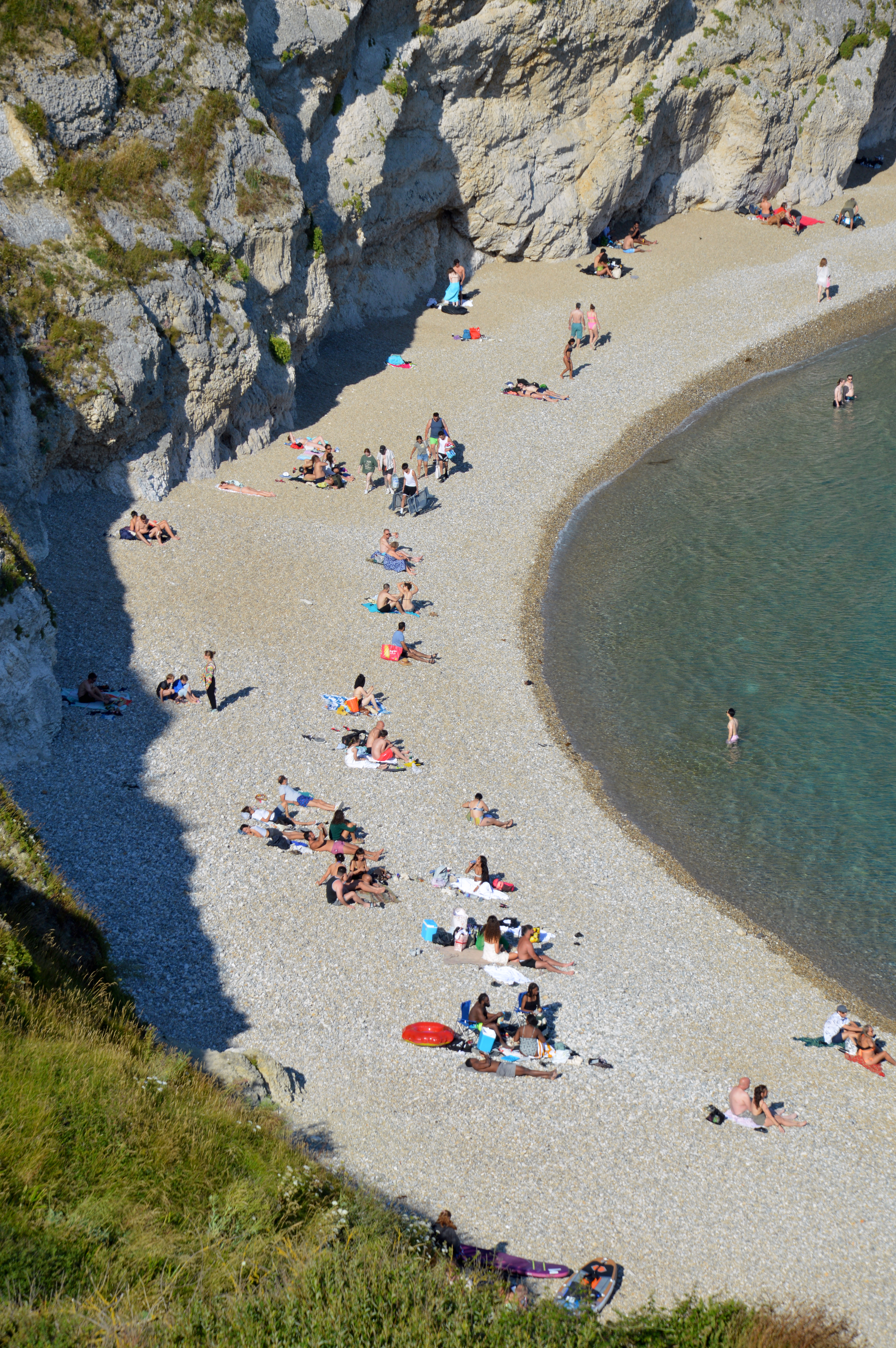
People at the beach in Man o' War Cove, Dorset, in 2024

This is a list of notable beaches in the United Kingdom.

== England ==
- Bigbury-on-Sea, Devon
- Biggar, Cumbria
- Blackpool, Lancashire
- Blackpool Sands, Devon
- Bournemouth, Dorset
- Brean, Somerset
- Bridlington, East Riding of Yorkshire
- Brighton, Sussex
- Bude, Cornwall
- Burnham-on-Sea, Somerset
- Castle Cove, Dorset
- Chesil Beach, Dorset
- Church Ope Cove, Dorset
- Clacton-on-Sea, Essex
- Crantock, Cornwall
- Dawlish Warren, Devon
- Earnse Bay, Cumbria
- Exmouth, Devon
- Fistral Beach, Cornwall
- Goodrington Sands, Devon
- Great Yarmouth, Norfolk
- Gyllyngvase, Cornwall
- Hayle Towans, Cornwall
- Holywell Bay, Cornwall
- Lowestoft, Suffolk
- Lulworth Cove, Dorset
- Lyme Regis, Dorset
- Maenporth, Cornwall
- Margate, Kent
- Minehead, Somerset
- Morecambe Bay, Lancashire
- Mount's Bay, Cornwall
- Newquay, Cornwall
- Paignton, Devon
- Perranporth, Cornwall
- Porthcurno, Cornwall
- Saunton Sands, Devon
- Scarborough, North Yorkshire
- Slapton Sands, Devon
- Southend-on-Sea, Essex
- St Oswald's Bay, Dorset
- Studland, Dorset
- Rampside Beach, Cumbria
- Roanhead, Cumbria
- St. Ives, Cornwall
- Teignmouth, Devon
- Torquay, Devon
- Watergate Bay, Cornwall
- Weston-super-Mare, North Somerset
- Westward Ho!, Devon
- Weymouth, Dorset
- Woolacombe, Devon

== Northern Ireland ==
- Downhill Strand
- Magilligan
- Portstewart Strand
- White Park Bay

== Scotland ==
- Aberdeen Beach
- Sandwood Bay

== Wales ==
- Aberystwyth
- Barafundle Bay, South Pembrokeshire
- Broad Haven South, South Pembrokeshire
- Freshwater West, South Pembrokeshire
- Pendine Sands, Carmarthenshire
- Poppit Sands, Pembrokeshire
- Saundersfoot, South Pembrokeshire
- Tenby, South Pembrokeshire
- Whitesands, Pembrokeshire

== British Overseas Territories ==
=== Anguilla ===
- Dog Island
- Island Harbour
- Scrub Island

=== Bermuda ===
- Annie's Bay
- Castle Harbour
- Church Bay
- Coney Island
- Devil's Hole
- Gunner Bay
- Horseshoe Bay
- Ireland Island
- Tobacco Bay
- Turtle Bay

=== British Indian Ocean Territory ===
- Danger Island
- East Point
- Egmont Islands
- Nelsons Island
- Peros Banhos
- Salomon Islands
- Three Brothers

=== British Virgin Islands ===
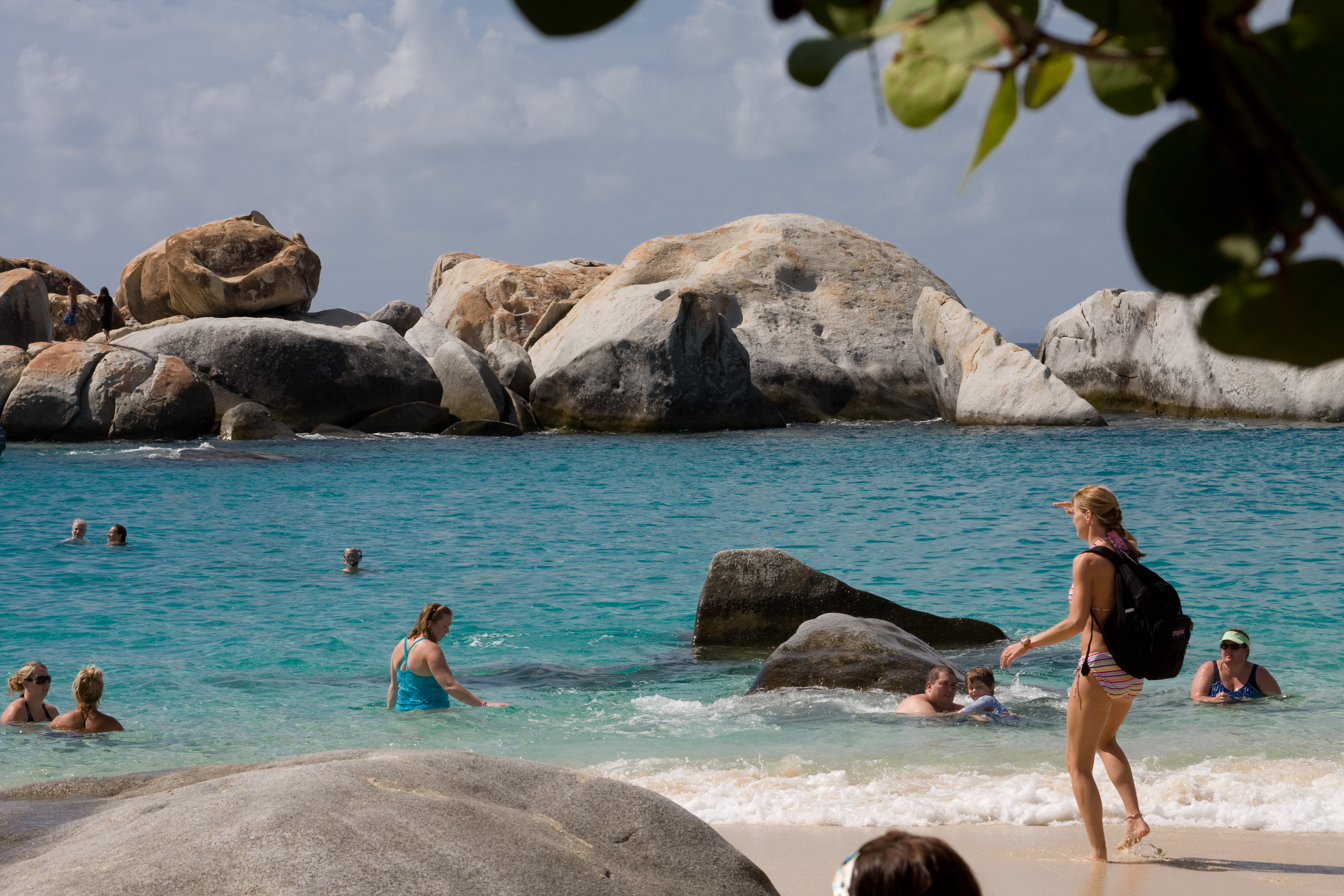
The bay area at The Baths, Virgin Gorda, British Virgin Islands

- Beef Island
- Guana Island
- Scrub Island
- The Baths, Virgin Gorda

=== Cayman Islands ===
- Bodden Town
- East End
- North Side
- West Bay

=== Falkland Islands ===
- Beauchene Island
- Beaver Island
- Blanco Bay
- Bull Point
- Carcass Island
- Concordia Bay
- Dunnose Head
- Foul Bay
- Fox Bay
- George Island
- Grand Jason Island
- Green Patch
- Johnson's Harbour
- Kepple Island
- Lively Island
- Pebble Island
- Saunders Island
- Speedwell Island
- Steeple Jason Island
- Weddell Island
- Westpoint Island
- Yorke Bay

=== Gibraltar ===
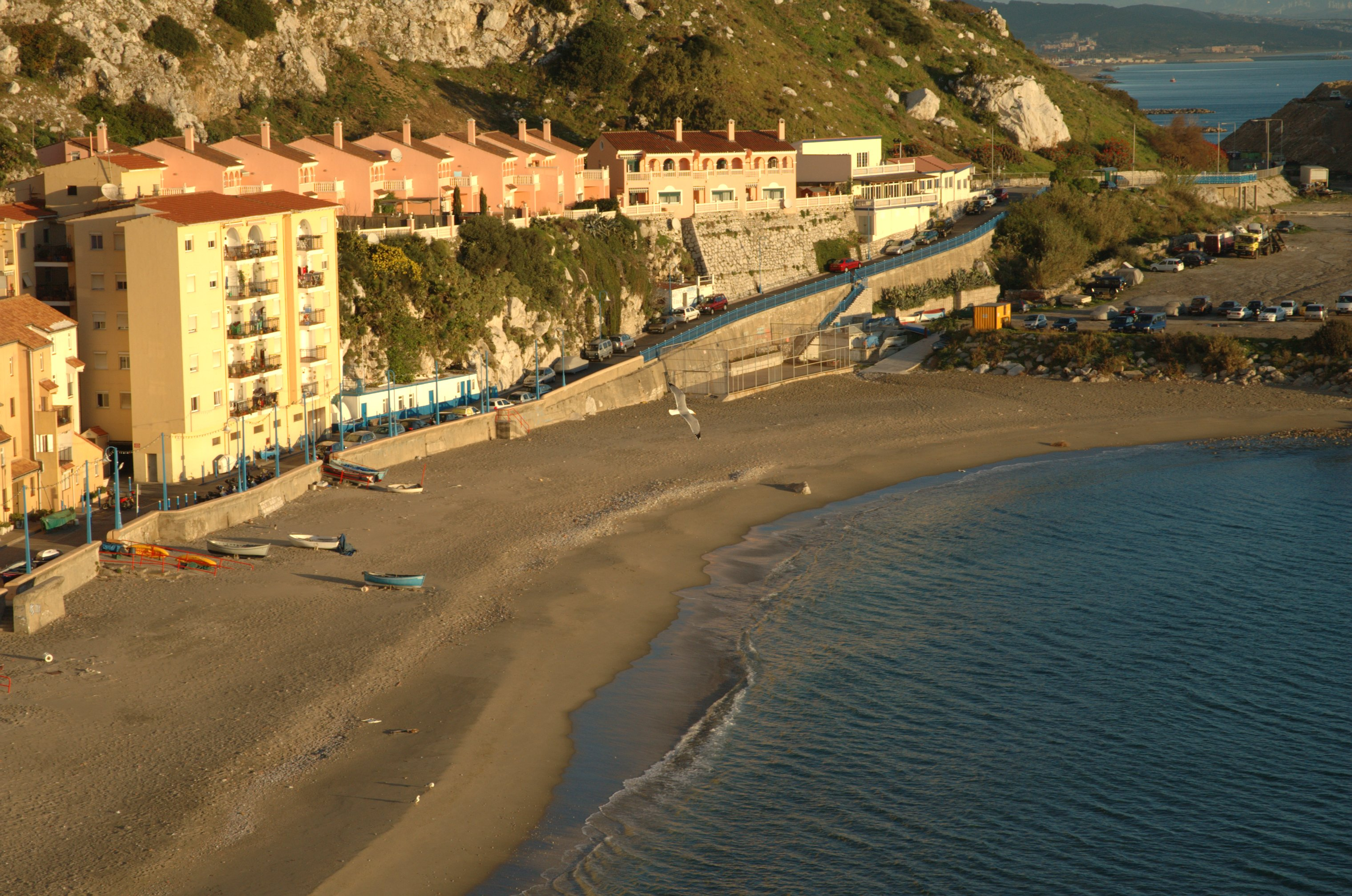
A view of Catalan Bay, Gibraltar, in the morning, looking North from the Caleta Palace Hotel

- Catalan Bay
- Eastern Beach
- Sandy Bay

=== Montserrat ===
- Little Bay
- Plymouth

=== Pitcairn Islands ===
- Bounty Bay
- Henderson Island
- Oeno Island

=== Saint Helena, Ascension and Tristan da Cunha ===
- Edinburgh of the Seven Seas
- Georgetown

=== South Georgia and the South Sandwich Islands ===
- Antarctic Bay
- Bay of Isles
- Cheapman Bay
- Church Bay
- Cooper Island
- Cumberland East Bay
- Cumberland West Bay
- Fortuna Bay
- Godthul
- Hound Bay
- Ice Fjord
- Iris Bay
- King Haakon Bay
- Newark Bay
- Ocean Harbour
- Queen Maud Bay
- Right Whale Bay
- Rocky Bay
- Royal Bay
- St Andrew's Bay
- Stromness
- Undine South Harbour
- Willis Islands
- Wilson Harbour

=== Turks and Caicos Islands ===
- Ambergris Cay
- East Caicos
- Parrot Cay
- Pine Cay
- Salt Cay

== See also ==
- Coastline of the United Kingdom
- List of beaches (worldwide)
- List of seaside resorts in the United Kingdom
