= Harker Glacier =

Glacier in Antarctica

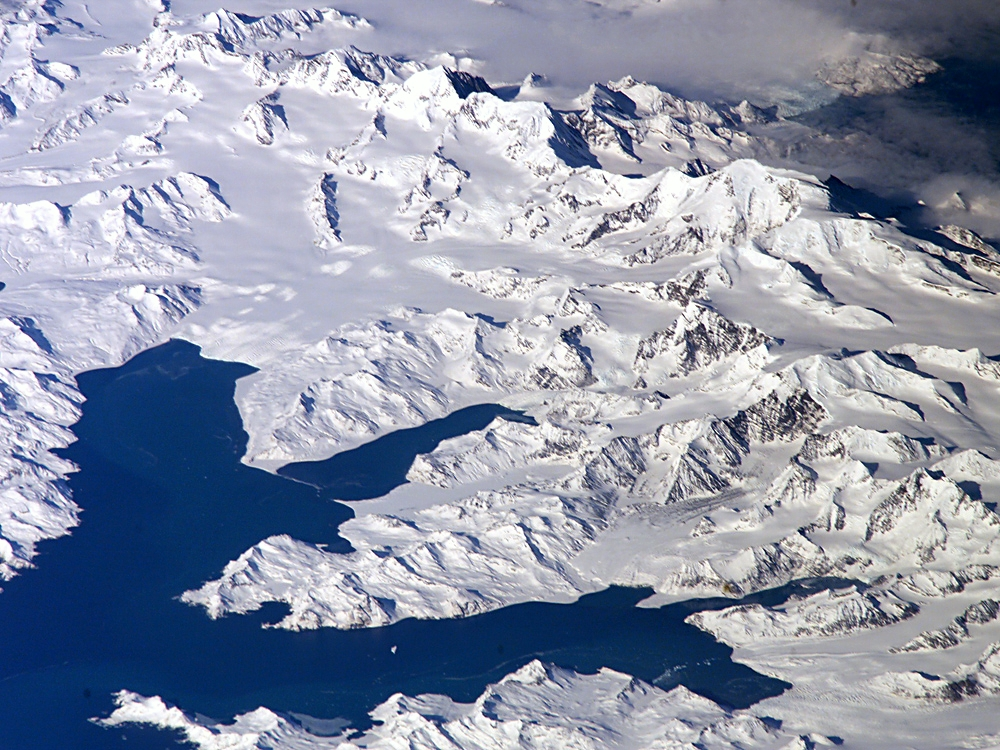
- South Georgia: Cumberland Bay; Thatcher Peninsula with King Edward Cove (Grytviken); Allardyce Range with the summit Mt. Paget (NASA imagery)

- Location within South Georgia Island
- Location: South Georgia
- Coordinates: 54°22′0.12″S 36°31′59.88″W
- Thickness: unknown
- Terminus: Cumberland Bay
- Status: stable / advancing

Harker Glacier is a tidewater glacier on South Georgia Island in the southern Atlantic Ocean. Harker glacier was first mapped by the Swedish Antarctic Expedition (1901–1904), and named De Geer Glacier, after Gerard De Geer (1858–1943), a Swedish geologist who specialized in geomorphology and geochronology. It was remapped in 1912 by David Ferguson, and renamed for Alfred Harker (1859–1939), an English geologist who specialised in petrology and petrography.

The valley in which Harker Glacier is located drains from south to north out of the Allardyce Range into Moraine Fjord in the eastern side of Cumberland Bay, south of Grytviken, the principal settlement of the island. Harker Glacier is a tidewater glacier that contributes icebergs to the bay. The glacier has not changed significantly since the 1970s, but is further advanced than when it was photographed by Frank Hurley in 1914.

== See also ==
- List of glaciers in the Antarctic
- Glaciology
