= Nordenskjöld Peak =

Mountain in South Georgia

Nordenskjöld Peak (54°29′S 36°22′W) is a conspicuous, partly snow-covered mountain, 2,355 m (7,726 ft), which rises at the head of Nordenskjöld Glacier and stands close east of Mount Roots in the Allardyce Range of South Georgia. The name derives from nearby Nordenskjöld Glacier (itself named after Swedish explorer Otto Nordenskjöld), and was given by David Ferguson, Scottish geologist who visited South Georgia in 1911–12.
