= COVID-19 pandemic in the Falkland Islands =

Ongoing COVID-19 viral pandemic in the Falkland Islands

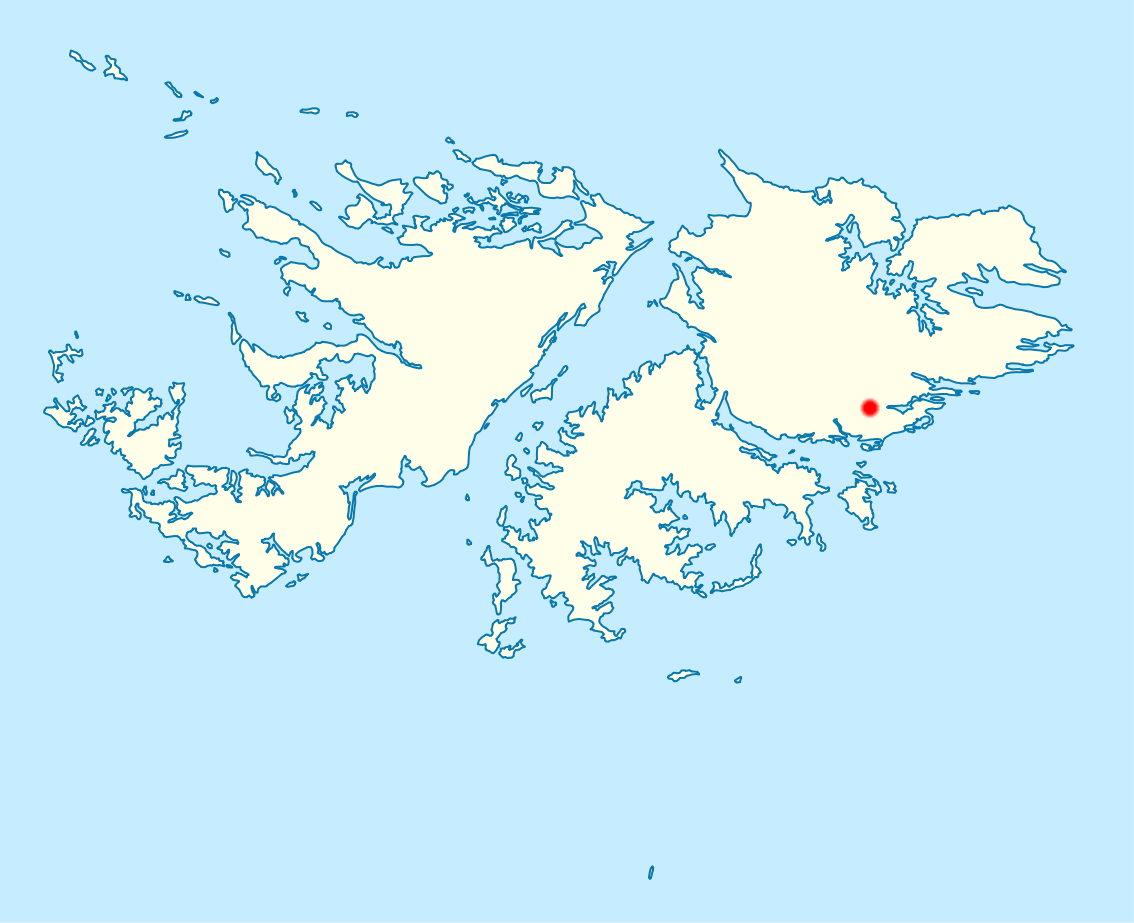
- Location of the COVID-19 outbreak
- Disease: COVID-19
- Pathogen: SARS-CoV-2
- Location: Falkland Islands
- First outbreak: Wuhan, China
- Index case: RAF Mount Pleasant
- Arrival date: 3 April 2020 (6 years, 5 months and 4 days)
- Confirmed cases: 1,930
- Recovered: 1,930

Government website
- COVID-19 @ F.I.G.

The COVID-19 pandemic in the Falkland Islands is part of the worldwide pandemic of coronavirus disease 2019 (COVID-19) caused by severe acute respiratory syndrome coronavirus 2 (SARS-CoV-2). The virus was confirmed to be in the islands on 3 April 2020. During the first wave, the number of cases peaked at 13, with all being from the military base at Mount Pleasant leaving none from the general population. All 13 patients recovered. On 10 November, a new case was discovered. As of 4 May 2022 a total of 195 people were confirmed to have been infected.

== Background ==
The Falkland Islands Infectious Diseases Plan set out stages for the COVID-19 response. The Falkland Islands carried out robust preparations for COVID-19. It was announced that measures may include:

- Restrictions on all non-essential travel both internationally and locally.
- Possible changes in attendance to schools and nurseries, which will be implemented gradually in the next few weeks.
- Revised arrangements on the use of Falkland Islands Government Air Service (FIGAS) and Concordia Bay.
- Changes to the delivery of health services. This includes changes to the way King Edward VII Memorial Hospital (KEMH) will operate. Medical visits to Camp will also be increased.
- Contacting those vulnerable people we know of and providing further advice.
- A range of measures to support the Falkland Islands economy, including businesses and staff, are being developed and will be announced in due course.

There were no facilities to test for the virus on the Falklands and initially it took around ten days to get test results back from Britain, which is almost 8,000 miles away. On 23 March, the Argentinian Government offered the British ambassador to Brazil medical supplies including COVID-19 tests, but the Falklands did not follow up on the offer. The Falklands had received the equipment to test locally, and the laboratory was fully operational by 18 May.

== Timeline ==
=== March 2020 ===
On 19 March 2020, around 238 people were flown off the islands on a plane bound for Córdoba, Argentina.

The Falkland Islands government confirmed it had had contact with the United Kingdom concerning the pandemic. It advised tourists and foreigners to leave the archipelago as it could not guarantee further flights leaving the islands, whilst cruise ships reaching the Falklands would only be allowed to dock if passengers had been on board for at least ten days and if none had developed symptoms of COVID-19, with travel between the islands of the Falklands heavily restricted, and social distancing measures put in place.

On 23 March 2020, Argentina said it had reached out to Britain's ambassador in Buenos Aires to offer material support to the islands.

On 26 March 2020, the islands' government closed all schools and nurseries until 4 May 2020. Two days later, it was confirmed that a child was critically ill with suspected COVID-19 and was being treated at a hospital in Stanley.

=== April 2020 ===
On 3 April 2020, the first case in the islands was officially confirmed. All schools and nurseries were closed and all workers not deemed critical told to stay at home. On 5 April 2020, a second case was confirmed. On 8 April 2020, there were five cases and one recovery, all serving at the Mount Pleasant Complex. 137 people were tested until that day. On 14 April 2020, there were 11 cases and one recovery.

By 15 April 2020, 255 samples had been processed. Additional measures were put in place, and journeys from and to Mount Pleasant Complex needed to be approved. On 17 April 2020, a set of measures was announced for individuals and business and includes among others, a job retention scheme, unemployment subsidy, non-repayable grants to businesses. On 23 April 2020, it was announced that the Falkland Islands would be able to test for COVID-19 the following week when testing machines were due to arrive. 337 samples had been sent to the United Kingdom.

On 27 April 2020, the prices of wool had dropped 50% compared to the previous year. The prices had already been in decline, but the remaining drop was caused by the COVID-19 pandemic. On 29 April 2020, it was announced that price of electricity per unit for all consumers would be decreased from £23 to £18 from 1 May 2020 onwards.

On 30 April 2020, it was announced that all 13 cases in the islands had recovered.

=== May–July 2020 ===
On 1 May 2020, an easing of restrictions was announced: schools and businesses would be allowed to reopen on 11 May, and the travel restriction between Stanley and Mount Pleasant would remain in effect. On 15 May 2020, further easing of restrictions for travel between the islands had been announced.

On 6 July 2020, new quarantine regulations came into effect for the Falkland Islands. Visitors to the islands had to provide information about their journey and where they would be staying. A mandatory 14-day isolation had to be observed on arrival. Military personnel who have completed quarantine in the United Kingdom were exempted.

=== November–December 2020 ===
On 10 November 2020, a new case was discovered. The case was from a civilian who was in quarantine. A total of four new cases were confirmed during this second wave of the pandemic in the islands until 2 December 2020. All four cases were confirmed as recovered on 9 December 2020. Six new cases were also confirmed later on 15 December and on 22 December 2020.

=== January–February 2021 ===
On 12 January 2021, the Falkland Islands Government announced that it was expected to receive 5,200 doses of the AZD1222 vaccine developed by Oxford University and AstraZeneca during February 2021. On 24 February, the islands received their second shipment of doses from the United Kingdom, totaling 2,200 doses of AZD1222.

=== June 2022 ===
On 29 June 2022 the King Edward Memorial Hospital (KEMH) announced that the COVID-19 virus was considered endemic in the Falkland Islands due to low infection rates. Patients were no longer required to report symptoms or positive test results to the KEMH. Self-quarantining remained advised for symptomatic individuals.

== Statistics ==
The chart shows the development of the pandemic starting from 3 April 2020, representing changes in net number of cases, based on the number of cases reported in the Falkland Islands Government reports.

View source data.
