= Hestesletten =

Hestesletten (54°18′S 36°31′W) is a glacial plain between the Hamberg Lakes and Cumberland East Bay, South Georgia. It is covered with tussock and is almost 2 miles (3.2 km) long in a northeast–southwest direction and 0.75 miles (1.2 km) wide. It is, along with Salisbury Plain, one of the few substantial flat areas on the island.

Junction Valley slopes eastward from Echo Pass to Hestesletten, connecting the two.

Zenker Ridge, a low moraine ridge, extends along the east side of Hestesletten. It runs southwest from Discovery Point at the entrance of Moraine Fjord to Osmic Hill. Osmic Hill rises 305 m (1,001 ft) from the surrounding plain, marking the north limit of an undulating ridge of hills on the west side of Moraine Fjord. This area was first charted by the Swedish Antarctic Expedition, 1901–04, under Nordenskjöld. Both Zenker Ridge and Osmic Hill were named by the Falkland Islands Dependencies Survey (FIDS) following their sketch survey in 1951, both names being derived from chemical fixatives (Zenker's fixative and Osmic acid) used in biological work by the FIDS.

== History ==
The name "Hestesletten" (Norwegian for "Horses' Plain") arose because a small herd of horses were introduced by the South Georgia Exploration Company in 1905, surviving here for a number of years.

During the Falklands War, on 25 April 1982, Royal Marines landed here, and went to King Edward Point, where Argentine forces surrendered later that day.
