= Tyrrell Glacier =

Glacier in Antarctica

- Location within South Georgia Island
- Location: South Georgia
- Coordinates: 54°22′S 36°31′W
- Thickness: unknown
- Terminus: Harker Glacier
- Status: unknown

Tyrrell Glacier (54°22′S 36°31′W) is a glacier flowing north into the head of Moraine Fjord where it joins Harker Glacier, on the north coast of South Georgia.

In 1982, the United Kingdom Antarctic Place-Names Committee (UK-APC), in association with Harker Glacier, named the Tyrell Glacier after George Walter Tyrrell (1883–1961). Tyrell was a senior lecturer in geology at the University of Glasgow from 1919–48, and authored several papers on the petrology of South Georgia, the South Shetland Islands, and the Palmer Archipelago area.

== See also ==
- List of glaciers in the Antarctic
- Glaciology
