= Junction Valley =

Valley in South Georgia

Junction Valley (54°17′S 36°32′W) is a valley sloping eastward from Echo Pass to Hestesletten on the west side of Cumberland East Bay, South Georgia. The name Junction Valley was originally applied by the Swedish Antarctic Expedition under Otto Nordenskiöld, 1901–04, to a valley joining Cumberland East Bay with Cumberland West Bay. The summit of this valley was later named Echo Pass. The original name has therefore been restricted to the eastern valley, and Sphagnum Valley has been applied to the western part.
