= Herbert Willes Webley Hope =

Royal Navy Admiral (1878–1968)

Admiral Herbert Willes Webley Hope CB CVO DSO DL (26 May 1878 – 26 April 1968) was a Royal Navy officer. During the First World War, he served in Room 40, the Admiralty's cryptoanalysis section, from 1914 to 1917, eventually becoming its de facto head.

A member of the Hope family, Hope was the son of Rear-Admiral Charles Webley-Hope, the grandson of Rear-Admiral Charles Hope, and the great-grandson of Charles Hope, Lord Granton. Admiral Sir George Price Webley Hope, Deputy First Sea Lord during the First World War, was his brother.

During the First World War, Hope served in the Admiralty's Room 40 from 1914 to review and interpret intercepted messages, eventually becoming its de facto head. Longing for a sea command, in 1917 he was appointed captain of the light cruiser HMS Dartmouth in the Adriatic, and was replaced by Commander William James.

In 1920, he commanded the Dartmouth on a naval voyage which visited South Georgia and Tristan da Cunha and which chartered Cumberland Bay and Shag Rocks. In South Georgia he defeated a riot by striking whalers at Grytviken who threatened to attack King Edward Point. He also surveyed King Edward Cove, whose entrance point, Hope Point, was named after him.

Promoted vice-admiral on 1 April 1931, he retired the following day. He was promoted to admiral on the retired list on 1 January 1936. On the outbreak of the Second World War, Hope was recalled for service to the Government Code and Cypher School's naval section.
