= Castle Cove =

Castle Cove may refer to:

- Castle Cove, New South Wales, Australia, a suburb of Sydney
- Castle Cove, Weymouth, England, a beach
- Castlecove, Ireland, a village in County Kerry
- Castle Cove (Victoria), a beach in Victoria, Australia
