= List of seaside resorts in the United Kingdom =

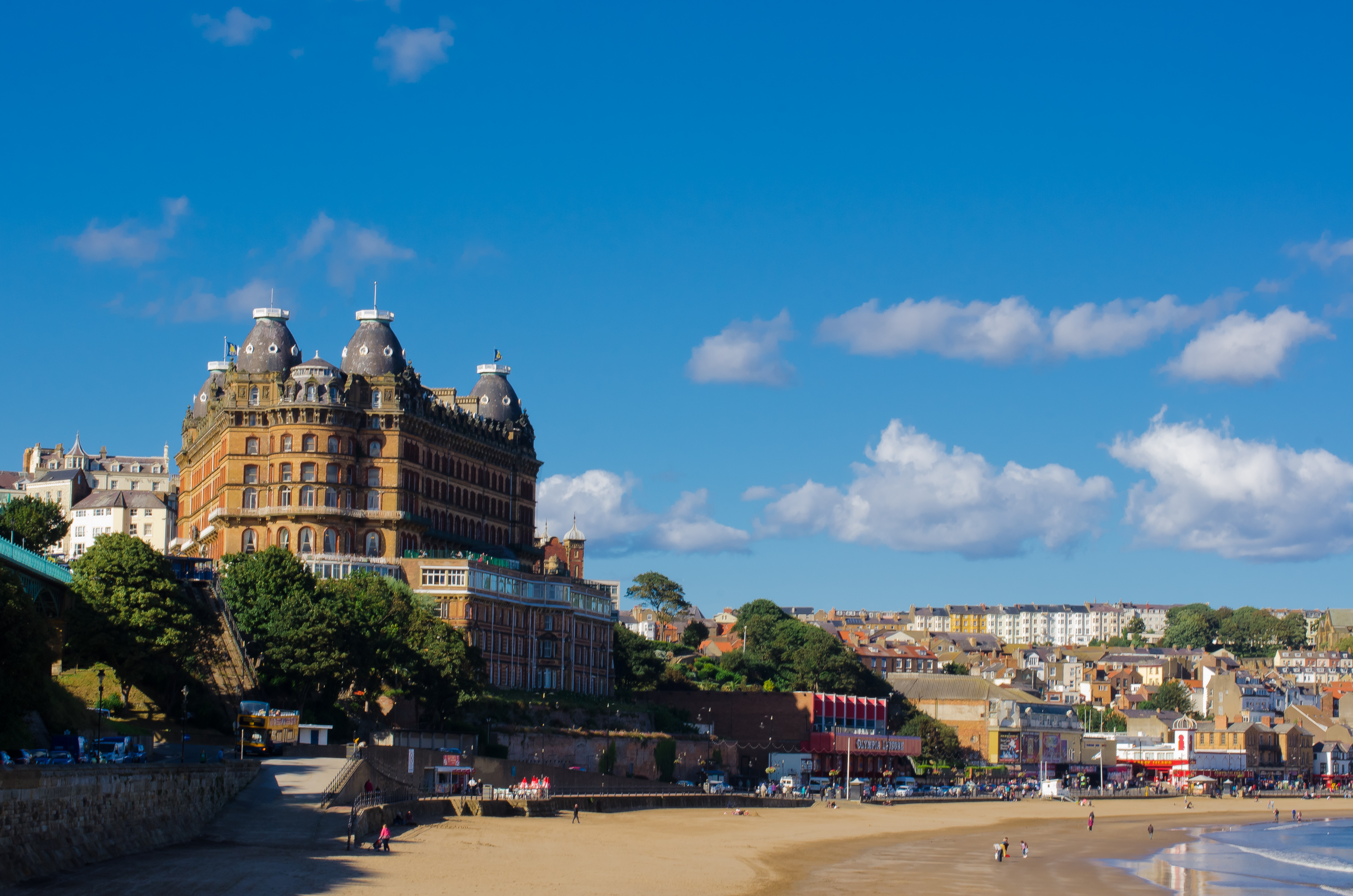
Scarborough, North Yorkshire is an English seaside resort

Below is a list of seaside resorts in the United Kingdom.

== A ==
- Aberdyfi
- Abergele
- Abersoch
- Aberystwyth
- Ainsdale
- Appledore, Torridge, Devon
- Ayr

== B ==
- Bamburgh
- Bangor, County Down
- Barmouth
- Barry
- Barton-on-Sea
- Beer, Devon
- Benllech
- Bexhill-on-Sea
- Blackpool
- Blakeney
- Bognor Regis
- Borth
- Boscombe
- Bournemouth
- Bridlington
- Brighton
- Brixham
- Broadstairs
- Bude
- Budleigh Salterton
- Burnham-on-Sea
- Burntisland

== C ==
- Caister-on-Sea
- Camber Sands
- Canvey Island
- Chapel St Leonards
- Clacton-on-Sea
- Clarach Bay
- Cleethorpes
- Clevedon
- Cleveleys
- Clovelly
- Collieston
- Colwyn Bay
- Criccieth
- Cromer
- Crosby
- Croyde
- Cruden Bay
- Cullercoats
- Crimdon

== D ==
- Dartmouth
- Dawlish
- Dawlish Warren
- Deal, Kent
- Dornoch
- Dunbar
- Dunoon

== E ==
- Eastbourne
- Ellenabeich
- English Riviera
- Exmouth

== F ==
- Fairbourne
- Falmouth, Cornwall
- Felixstowe
- Ferryside
- Filey
- Fishguard
- Fleetwood
- Folkestone
- Formby
- Fowey
- Frinton-on-Sea

== G ==
- Girvan
- Goodrington
- Goring-by-Sea
- Gorleston
- Gourock
- Gower Peninsula
- Grange-over-Sands
- Great Yarmouth

== H ==
- Harlech
- Hastings
- Helensburgh
- Hemsby
- Herne Bay, Kent
- Hopton-on-Sea
- Hornsea
- Hunstanton
- Hythe, Kent
- Hayle

== I ==
- Ilfracombe
- Ingoldmells

== K ==
- Kessingland
- Kilchattan Bay
- Kinghorn

== L ==
- Largs
- Littlehampton
- Llandanwg
- Llanddona
- Llandudno
- Llanfairfechan
- Llangrannog
- Llansteffan
- Looe
- Lowestoft
- Lydd-on-Sea
- Lyme Regis
- Lympstone
- Lynmouth
- Lytham St Annes

== M ==
- Mablethorpe
- Marazion
- Margate
- Melcombe Regis
- Milford Haven
- Minehead
- Morecambe
- Mumbles
- Mwnt

== N ==
- Nairn
- Nefyn
- New Brighton, Merseyside
- New Quay
- Newbiggin-by-the-Sea
- Newcastle, County Down
- Newquay
- North Berwick

== O ==
- Oban
- Overstrand

== P ==
- Padstow
- Paignton
- Pembrey
- Penarth
- Pendine
- Penmaenmawr
- Penzance
- Perranporth
- Polzeath
- Poole
- Porthcawl
- Porthgain
- Porthleven
- Portishead
- Portobello, Edinburgh
- Portrush
- Prestatyn
- Preston, Devon
- Pwllheli
- Portstewart
- Port Isaac

== R ==
- Ramsgate
- Redcar
- Rhos-on-Sea
- Rhyl
- Roker, Sunderland
- Rothesay
- Ryde, Isle of Wight

== S ==
- St Helens, Isle of Wight
- St Ives, Cornwall
- Salcombe
- Salcombe Regis
- Saltburn-by-the-Sea
- Saltcoats
- Sandbanks
- Sandgate, Kent
- Sandilands
- Sandown, Isle of Wight
- Saundersfoot
- Scarborough
- Seaburn, Sunderland
- Seaford
- Seahouses
- Seaton Carew
- Seaton, Devon
- Severn Beach
- Shanklin, Isle of Wight
- Shell Island
- Sheringham
- Shoreham-by-Sea
- Sidmouth
- Silloth
- Skegness
- South Shields
- Southbourne, Dorset
- Southend-on-Sea
- Southport
- Southsea
- Southwold
- Stonehaven
- Studland
- The Sunrise Coast
- Sutton-on-Sea
- Swanage
- Swansea

== T ==
- Teignmouth
- Tenby
- Thorpeness
- Torcross
- Torquay
- Towyn
- Trebarwith Strand
- Trearddur
- Tynemouth
- Tywyn

== V ==
- Ventnor, Isle of Wight

== W ==
- Walton-on-the-Naze
- Watchet
- Westcliff-on-Sea
- Westgate-on-Sea
- Weston-super-Mare
- Westward Ho!
- Weymouth
- Whitby
- Whitehaven
- Whitley Bay
- Whitstable
- Widemouth Bay
- Withernsea
- Woolacombe
- Worthing

== Y ==
- Yarmouth
- Ynyslas

== See also ==
- Coastline of the United Kingdom
- List of beaches in the United Kingdom
- Tourism in the United Kingdom
