= Hamberg Lakes =

The Hamberg Lakes (54°19′S 36°31′W) are two adjoining lakes lying near the northern outlet of Hamberg Glacier, 1 nautical mile (2 km) west of Moraine Fjord, Cumberland East Bay, South Georgia. They were first surveyed by the Swedish Antarctic Expedition, 1901–04, under Otto Nordenskiöld. The name derives from nearby Hamberg Glacier, and was given by A. Szielasko who explored this vicinity in 1906.
