= Scrub Island =

Scrub Island may refer to:

- Scrub Island, Anguilla
- Scrub Island (British Virgin Islands)
