= Nachtigal Peak =

Mountain peak in South Georgia

Nachtigal Peak (54°29′S 36°14′W) is a rocky peak on a spur projecting northward from the southeast extremity of the Allardyce Range, South Georgia. It rises to 1,160 m (3,810 ft) at the west side of the head of Cook Glacier, 4 nautical miles (4.6 mi; 7.4 km) east of Nordenskjold Peak. The name "Kleine Pic" (Little Peak) was given to this feature by the German group of the International Polar Year Investigations, 1882–83. The SGS, 1951–52, reported that "Kleine Pic" is not particularly descriptive or distinctive for the peak described, and that name has been rejected. The name Nachtigal Peak, recommended by the United Kingdom Antarctic Place-Names Committee (UK-APC) in 1954, derives from nearby Nachtigal Glacier, which was named by the German group of 1882–83.
