= Luisa Bay =

Bay on South Georgia Island

Luisa Bay (54°23′S 36°11′W) is a small bay lying between Cape Vakop and Mount Skittle on the north coast of South Georgia. It was surveyed by the South Georgia Survey, 1951–52, and named by the UK Antarctic Place-Names Committee for the Luisa, one of the vessels of the Compañía Argentina de Pesca which participated in establishing the first permanent whaling station at Grytviken, South Georgia, in 1904. The vessel is now a hulk lying in King Edward Cove.
