= King Edward Memorial Hospital =

King Edward Memorial Hospital may refer to:

- King Edward Memorial Hospital and Seth Gordhandas Sunderdas Medical College in Mumbai, India
- King Edward Memorial Hospital for Women in Subiaco, Western Australia
- King Edward VII Memorial Hospital, Stanley, Falkland Islands
