= Sheridan Peak =

Mountain in South Georgia

- Location within Antarctica

Highest point
- Elevation: 955 metres (3,133 ft)
- Coordinates: 54°26′S 36°21′W

Geography
- Location: Antarctica

Sheridan Peak is a peak rising to 955 m near the head of Nordenskjold Glacier, South Georgia. During the British South Georgia Expedition, 1954–55, the feature was called "Thin Ridge." It was named by the United Kingdom Antarctic Place-Names Committee (UK-APC) in 1988 after Maj. James G. Sheridan, Royal Marines, who accepted the surrender of the Argentine garrison at King Edward Point, April 25, 1982.
