= Sphagnum Valley =

Valley in South Georgia

Sphagnum Valley (54°16′S 36°35′W) is a valley sloping northwest from Echo Pass to Cumberland West Bay, South Georgia. First charted by the Swedish Antarctic Expedition under Nordenskjold, 1901–04. Surveyed by the SGS in the period 1951-57 and named by the United Kingdom Antarctic Place-Names Committee (UK-APC) after Sphagnum, the bog moss which occurs in this valley.
