= Hound Bay =

Coordinates: 54°22′S 36°13′W

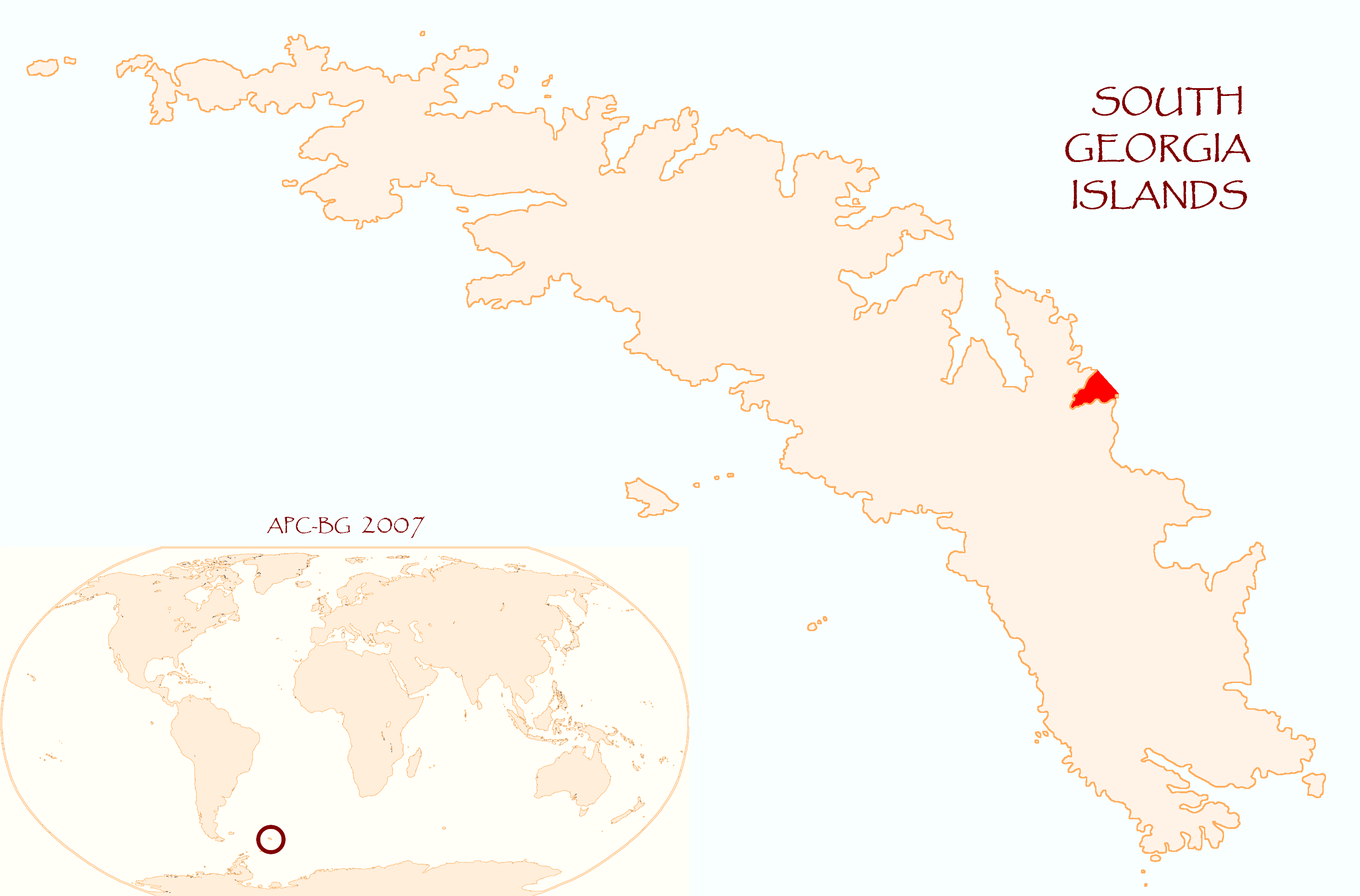
Location of Hound Bay on South Georgia Island

Hound Bay (Norwegian: Bikjebugten) is a bay at the base of Barff Peninsula. It is 2.5 miles (4 km) wide at its mouth and recedes 3 miles (5 km), entered between Tijuca Point and Cape Vakop along the north coast of South Georgia. The names "George Bay" and "Hundebugten" have appeared on charts for this feature. The South Georgia Survey (SGS) of 1951–52 reported that this bay was better known to whalers and sealers as "Bikjebugten" (the word Bikje implying any low type canine). The name Hound Bay, proposed by the UK Antarctic Place-Names Committee (UK-APC) is an English form of this name.

== Named features ==
Rolf Rock is a small isolated rock in Hound Bay, 1.5 nautical miles (2.8 km) south-southeast of Tijuca Point. It was named by UK-APC, following mapping by the SGS, 1951–52, after the Rolf, one of the vessels of the Compañía Argentina de Pesca which participated in establishing the first permanent whaling station at Grytviken, South Georgia, in 1904.

Lönnberg Valley, an ice-free valley, cuts southwest from the base of Hound Bay to Nordenskjöld Glacier, inland. It was surveyed by the SGS between 1951 and 1957, and named by the UK-APC for Professor Einar Lönnberg, a Swedish zoologist.

Cape Vakop is a headland between Hound Bay and Luisa Bay. It was charted by the Second German Antarctic Expedition, 1911–12, under Wilhelm Filchner. The name appears on a chart based upon surveys of South Georgia in 1926–30 by Discovery Investigations personnel, but may represent an earlier naming.

== History ==
On 21 April 1982, the British Special Boat Service was landed at Hound Bay beach from helicopters based on HMS Endurance, and attempted to cross to the Argentine positions through Sörling Valley, and into Cumberland East Bay, where they were driven back by snow and ice on 22–24 April.
