= Foul Bay, Falkland Islands =

Coordinates: 51.349°S 58.931°W

Not to be confused with Foul Bay.

Map of the Falkland Islands showing Foul Bay

Foul Bay (Spanish: Bahia Sucia) is an inlet on East Falkland island in the Falkland Islands. It is in the north west of the island, between Concordia Bay and San Carlos Water, and the northern end of Falkland Sound. It is also near Cape Dolphin.
