= Gull Lake, South Georgia =

Lake in South Georgia

Gull Lake
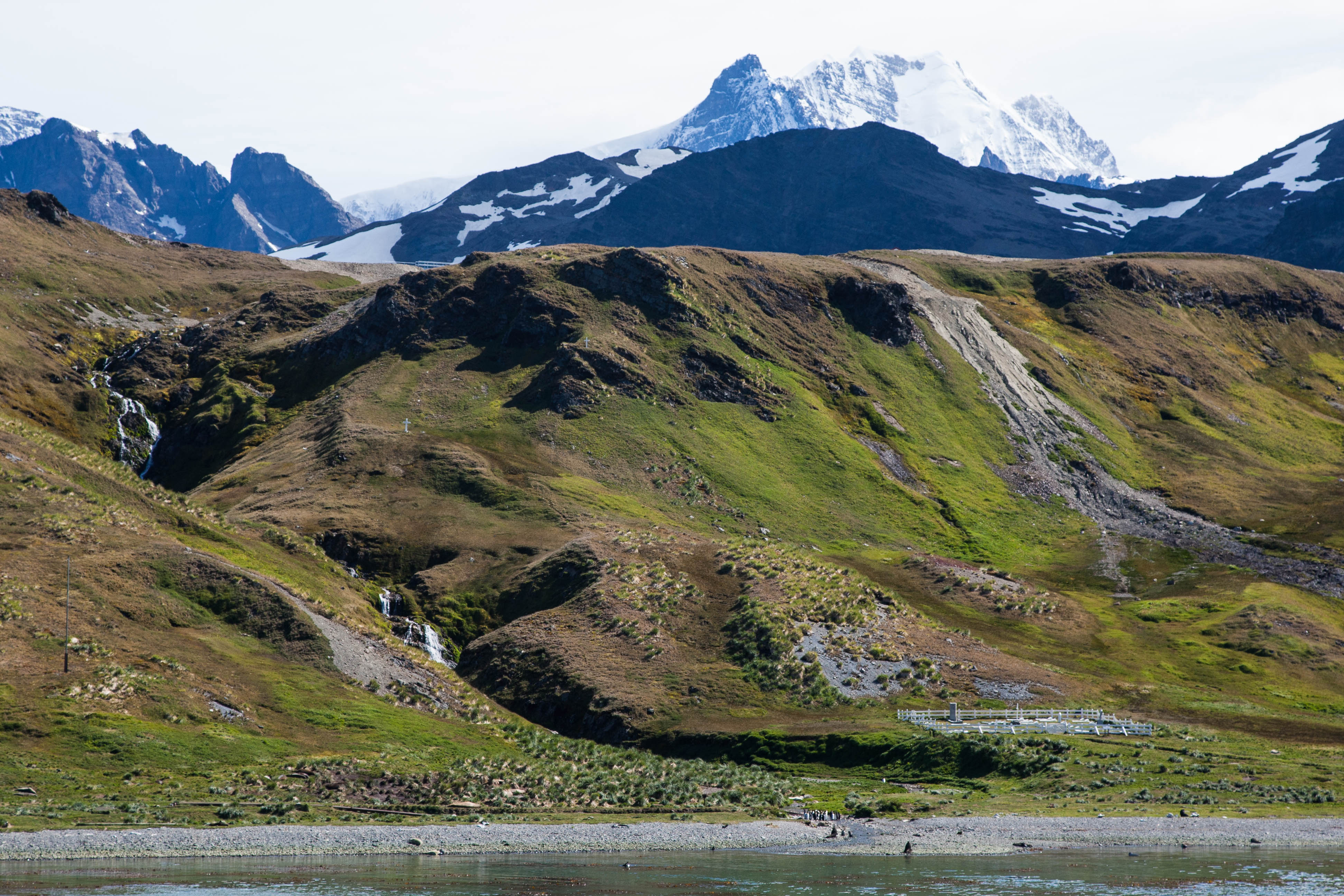

- Location within South Georgia Island
- Location: South Georgia
- Coordinates: 54°17′S 36°31′W
- Basin countries: (South Georgia)

Gull Lake (Spanish: Lago Gaviota) is a lake, 0.15 nautical miles (0.3 km) in diameter, lying close to the southwest shore of King Edward Cove, 0.5 nautical miles (1 km) south of the abandoned whaling station at Grytviken, South Georgia.

The lake was first roughly surveyed and named "Möwensee" or "Moven See" (Gull Lake) by A. Szielasko, who visited South Georgia in 1906. The English form Gull Lake was used by Robert Cushman Murphy in 1947, in describing his visit to the lake in November 1912. This latter form, recommended by the UK Antarctic Place-Names Committee in 1954, is approved.
