= Sörling Valley =

Valley in South Georgia

Coordinates: 54°22′S 36°18′W

Sörling Valley is an ice-free valley located between Cumberland East Bay and Hound Bay on the north side of South Georgia. It was surveyed by the SGS between 1951 and 1957 and named by the United Kingdom Antarctic Place-Names Committee (UK-APC) in honour of Erik Sörling from the Riksmuseum in Stockholm, who made zoological collections in South Georgia in 1904 and 1905. Nearby features include Ellerbeck Peak, a mountain on the south side of the valley.

On 21 April 1982, during the Falklands War, the British SBS landed at Hound Bay beach from helicopters based on HMS Endurance, and attempted to cross to the Argentine positions through Sorling Valley and Cumberland East Bay.

To the northwest of Sörling Valley is the Barff Peninsula project.
