= Mount Roots =

Mountain in South Georgia

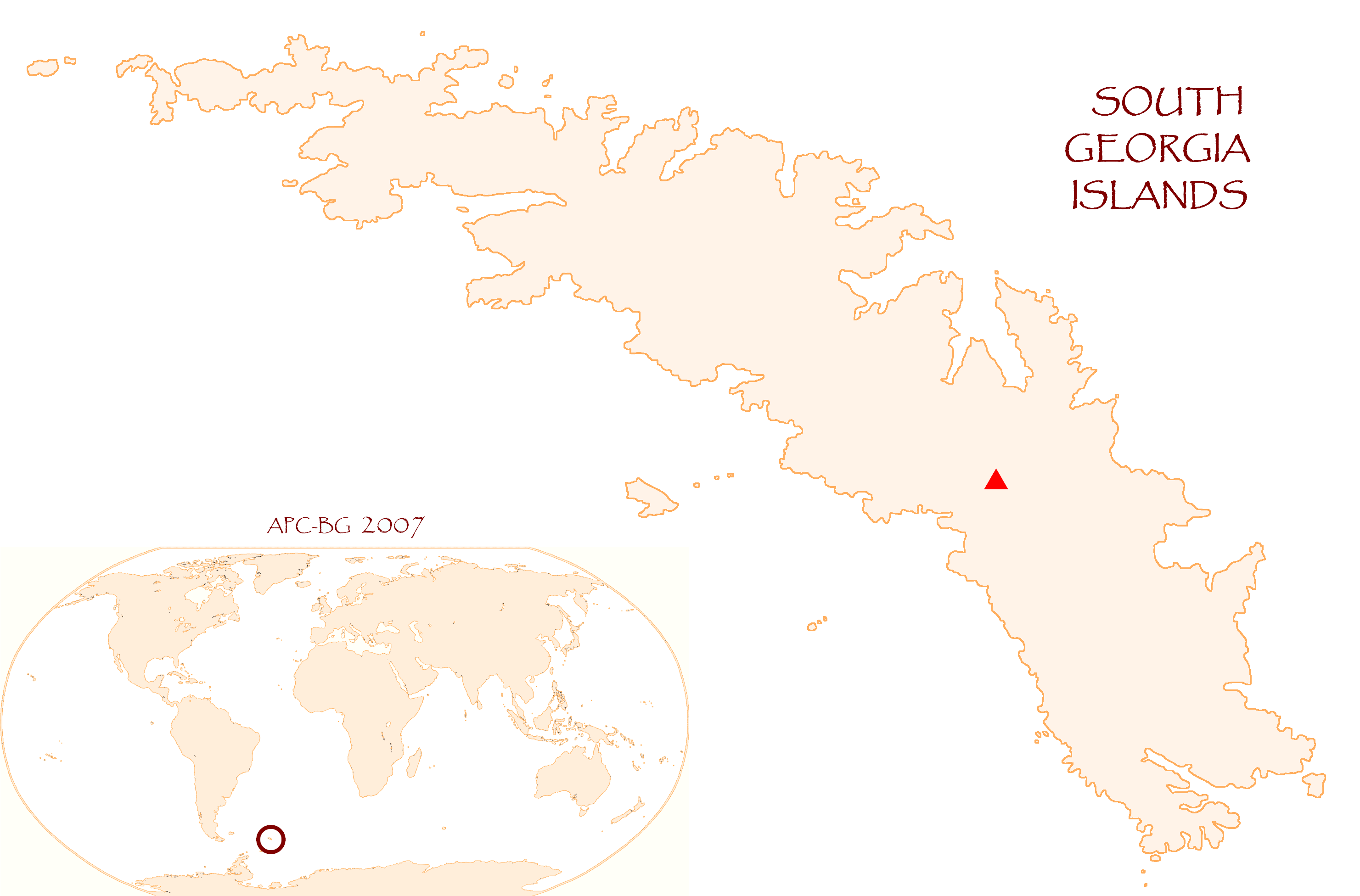
Mount Roots
Elevation:	2,270 metres (7,447 feet)
Coordinates:	54°28′S 36°24′W
Location:	South Georgia
Range:	Allardyce Range
First ascent:	January 2001
Easiest route:	snow/ice climb

Mount Roots is a mainly snow-covered mountain on South Georgia, standing near the head of Nordenskjold Glacier, 6 kilometres (3.7 mi) ESE of Mount Paget. Its western peak rises to 2,158 metres (7,080 ft); its eastern peak to 2,270 metres (7,450 ft). The mountain, fifth-highest on the island, is a prominent feature and presumably was known to whalers and sealers in South Georgia at an early date.

It was roughly surveyed in the period 1925–30 by DI personnel, and resurveyed by the SGS, 1951–52. Named by the UK-APC for James W. Roots, a member of the SGS, 1951–52.

The first ascent was made by British climbers Will Manners and Stuart Macdonald on the north buttress in January 2001.
