= Greene Peninsula =

Mountainous peninsula within Cumberland East Bay

Coordinates: 54°21′S 36°26′W

Location of Greene Peninsula

Greene Peninsula is a mountainous peninsula within Cumberland East Bay, separating Moraine Fjord to the west from the main arm of Cumberland East Bay, on the north coast of South Georgia Island. The entire area was charted by the Swedish Antarctic Expedition (SAE), 1901–04, under Otto Nordenskjöld. The peninsula was named by the UK Antarctic Place-Names Committee (UK-APC) in 1979 after Stanley Wilson Greene, a British bryologist who worked in South Georgia.

== Geography ==
Many features in and around Greene Peninsula have been charted and individually named. Many names in the area were given by the Falkland Islands Dependencies Survey (FIDS) in 1951 following a sketch survey, mostly derived from names of chemicals used to prepare biological material collected there by FIDS personnel. Unless otherwise noted, this applies to features described further in this article.

=== Shoreline and inland ===
Dartmouth Point marks the northernmost end of Greene Peninsula. It was charted by the Swedish Antarctic Expedition (SAE), 1901–04, and named after HMS Dartmouth, which surveyed the area in 1920. Balsam Beach is a narrow boulder beach with jagged islands close offshore, lying 0.75 nautical miles (1.4 km) east of Dartmouth Point. The beach appears on earlier charts, but the name was given by FIDS for balsam, a type of resin.

Sudan Beach is a small shingle beach 0.3 nmi (0.56 km) south of Dartmouth Point, on the west side of Greene Peninsula. It was named for the Sudan family of dyes.

Teal Ponds is a series of ponds in a tussock-covered valley 0.3 nmi (0.56 km) south of Dartmouth Point. They were roughly surveyed by FIDS in 1951 and named after the South Georgia teal, flocks of which frequent the ponds. Eosin Hill, 90 metres (300 ft) high, sits 0.5 nautical miles (1 km) southeast of Dartmouth Point. It was named by FIDS after the red dye eosin.

=== Offshore features ===
There are a pair of rocks lying approximately 0.5 nmi (0.93 km) east of Dartmouth Point. The more northerly of the two is called MacMahon Rock, whose name first appears on a 1930 British Admiralty chart. Sabre Rock rises 7.5 m (25 ft) above sea level. It was surveyed in January 1987 from HMS Herald and named descriptively.

Aniline Island is a small, flat-topped, rocky island, 5 metres (16 ft) high, lying 0.8 nautical miles (1.5 km) south-southwest of Dartmouth Point. The island appears on earlier charts, but was not named until it appeared on a 1951 FIDS map. The feature is named for the chemical staining agent aniline.
