= Ellerbeck Peak =

Mountain in South Georgia

Ellerbeck Peak (54°23′S 36°19′W) is a peak rising to 685 m on the south side of Sörling Valley, South Georgia. It was named by the United Kingdom Antarctic Place-Names Committee (UK-APC) in 1987 after Lieutenant Commander John A. Ellerbeck DSC, Royal Navy. During the Falklands War, he was the pilot in command of the helicopter from HMS Endurance that attacked and disabled the Argentine submarine Santa Fe during the retaking of Grytviken on April 25, 1982.
