= Allardyce Range =

Mountain range in South Georgia

Coordinates: 54°25′S 36°32′W

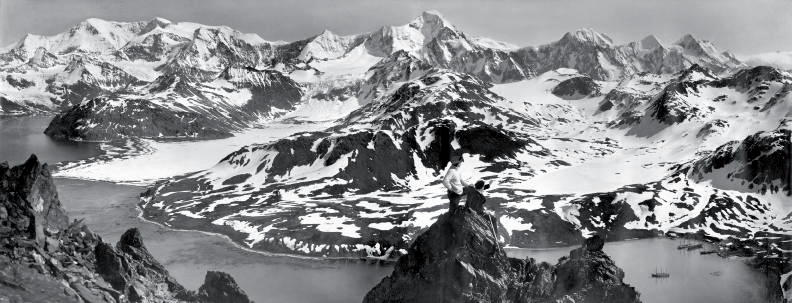
The interior of South Georgia photographed by Frank Hurley

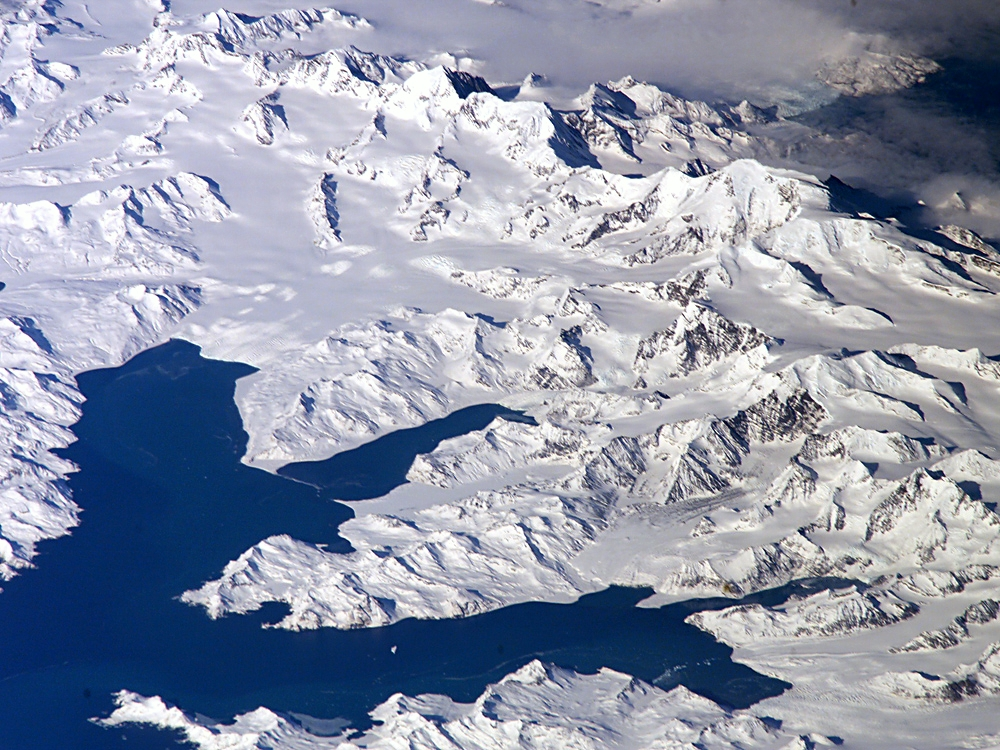
Central South Georgia: Cumberland Bay; Thatcher Peninsula with King Edward Cove (Grytviken) in the lower center; Allardyce Range with the summit Mt. Paget in the back (NASA imagery).

The Allardyce Range (Spanish: Cordillera de San Telmo) is a mountain range rising south of Cumberland Bay and dominating the central part of South Georgia, a British Overseas Territories. It extends for 50 km (31 mi) from Mount Globus in the northwest to Mount Brooker in the southeast, with peaks of 2,000 to 2,935 m (6,562 to 9,629 ft) and including Mount Paget (2,935 m or 9,629 ft) the highest peak of the range and also the highest point in the UK territory. Other peaks of the range include Mount Roots.

Although not shown on the charts of South Georgia by Cook in 1775 or Bellingshausen in 1819, peaks of this range were doubtless seen by those explorers. The range was named c. 1915 after Sir William Lamond Allardyce (1861–1930), Governor of the Falkland Islands and Dependencies, 1904–14.

== See also ==
- Nachtigal Peak
- Sutton Crag
