= Concordia Bay =

Bay in the Falkland Islands

Coordinates: 51.3136°S 58.6047°W

Map of the Falkland Islands showing Concordia Bay

Concordia Bay (Spanish: Ensenada del Norte) is on the north shore of East Falkland in the Falkland Islands. It is between Foul Bay and Salvador Water. It is also near Cape Dolphin, and the northern end of the Falkland Sound.
