= King Edward Cove =

Sheltered cove in the west side of Cumberland East Bay, South Georgia

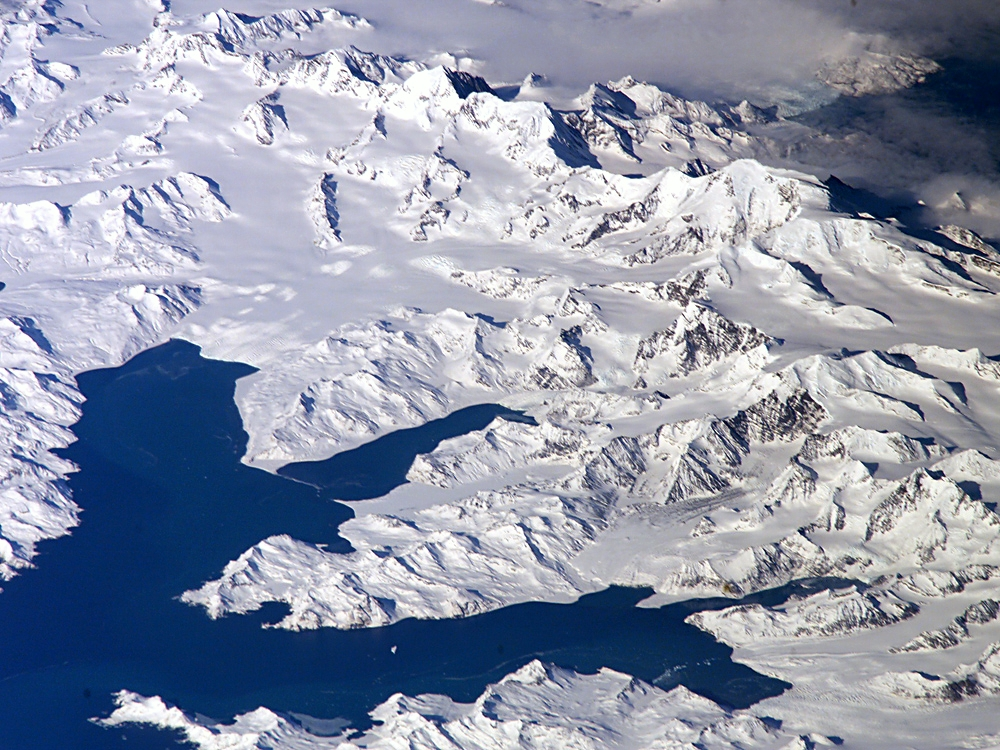
- Central South Georgia: Cumberland Bay; Thatcher Peninsula with King Edward Cove (Grytviken); Allardyce Range with the summit Mount Paget (NASA imagery).

- Coordinates: 54°17′S 36°30′W

King Edward Cove (Spanish: Caleta Capitán Vago) is a sheltered cove in the west side of Cumberland East Bay, South Georgia. This cove and its surrounding features, frequented by early sealers at South Georgia, was charted by the Swedish Antarctic Expedition, 1901–04, under Otto Nordenskiöld who named it Grytviken. That name, meaning 'Pot Bay,' was subsequently assumed by the whaling station and settlement built in 1904. The cove got its present name in about 1906 for King Edward VII of the United Kingdom.

British Antarctic Survey research station King Edward Point is located on Hope Point, the cove's northernmost headland. Abandoned whaling station Grytviken is located on the cove's western shore.

== Named features ==
Hope Point is a rocky bluff, 20 metres (70 ft) high, which forms the north side of the entrance to King Edward Cove. SAE personnel named it for H.W.W. Hope, who directed a 1920 survey of King Edward Cove by personnel on HMS Dartmouth. Hope Point is the site of a monument in commemoration of Sir Ernest Shackleton.

The cove sits southwest of Mount Duse and southeast of Mount Hodges. Gull Lake sits close to the cove's southwest shore.

Hobart Rock is a low rock lying at the south side of the entrance to the cove. The name appears on a chart based upon a survey of King Edward Cove by personnel on HMS Sappho in 1906. Just 0.25 miles (0.4 km) south of King Edward Cove is Susa Point, a low rocky point marking the seaward end of a small east–west ridge separating two tussock-covered flats. First surveyed by the SAE under Nordenskjold, it was named by the Falkland Islands Dependencies Survey (FIDS) following their sketch survey in 1951. The name is one of a group in the vicinity of Discovery Point derived from the chemical fixatives used there in biological work by the FIDS.
