= Echo Pass =

Mountain pass in South Georgia

Echo Pass (54°17′S 36°33′W) is a pass, 305 metres (1,000 ft) in elevation, lying 1.5 miles (2.4 km) southwest of Grytviken, South Georgia, in the chain of mountains which extends southwest from Mount Hodges. The pass provides a ski route from the station at Grytviken to the head of Cumberland West Bay. The name is used on the chart of a German expedition 1928–29, under Kohl-Larsen, who states that the name was already in use by whalers.

Junction Valley slopes eastward from Echo Pass to Hestesletten, connecting the two.
