= Blanco Bay =

Coordinates: 51°40′0″S 57°48′20″W

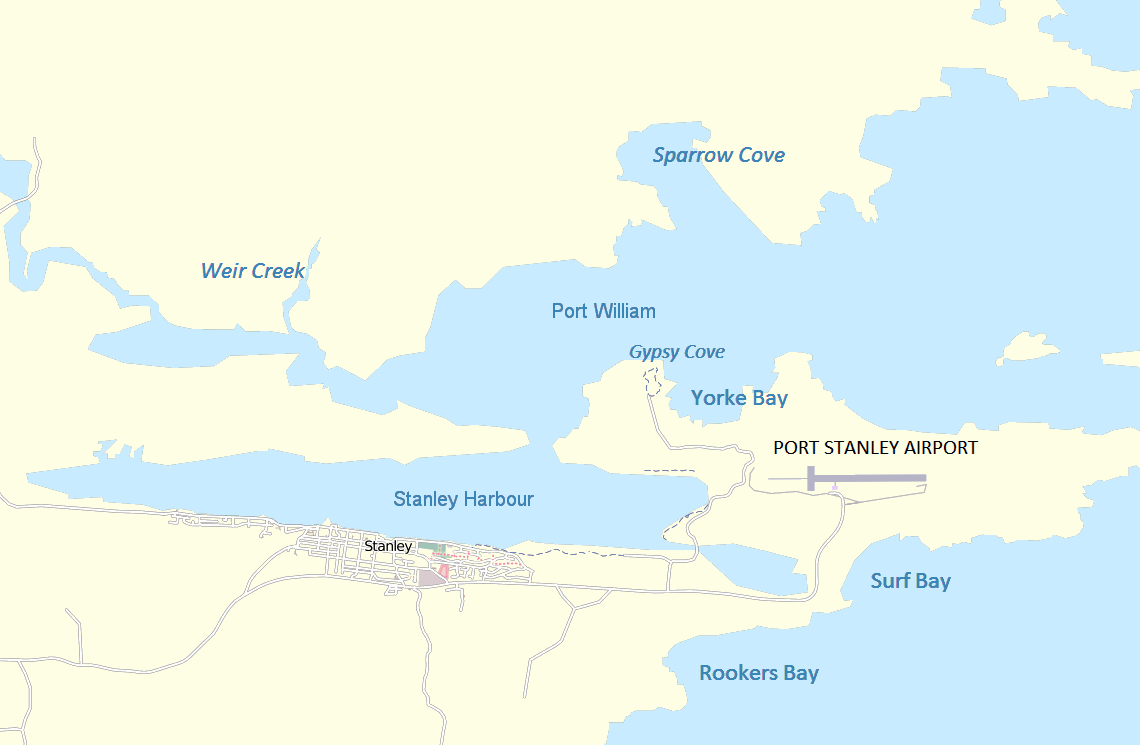
Map showing the Port Stanley area and Blanco Bay

Blanco Bay is a bay located to the north of Stanley, Falkland Islands. It contains the Sparrow Cove. Gypsy Cove and the smaller Yorke Bay lie in its southern part to the northwest of Port Stanley Airport. A small channel passes through to the town of Port Stanley itself.
