= The Sunrise Coast =

Stretch of tourist coastline in Suffolk, England

Coordinates: 52.4°N 1.7°E

The Sunrise Coast is a stretch of tourist coastline in the English county of Suffolk. The area includes the seaside resort towns of Lowestoft and Southwold and the inland Broads towns of Beccles and Bungay within the Waveney district.

The coast was awarded three Blue Flag beaches in 2011 – two at Lowestoft and one in Southwold. A further beach at Southwold and one at Kessingland were awarded Keep Britain Tidy Quality Coast Awards in recognition of their overall quality.
