= Castle Cove, Weymouth =

Beach in Dorset, England

Coordinates: 50.597°N 2.460°W

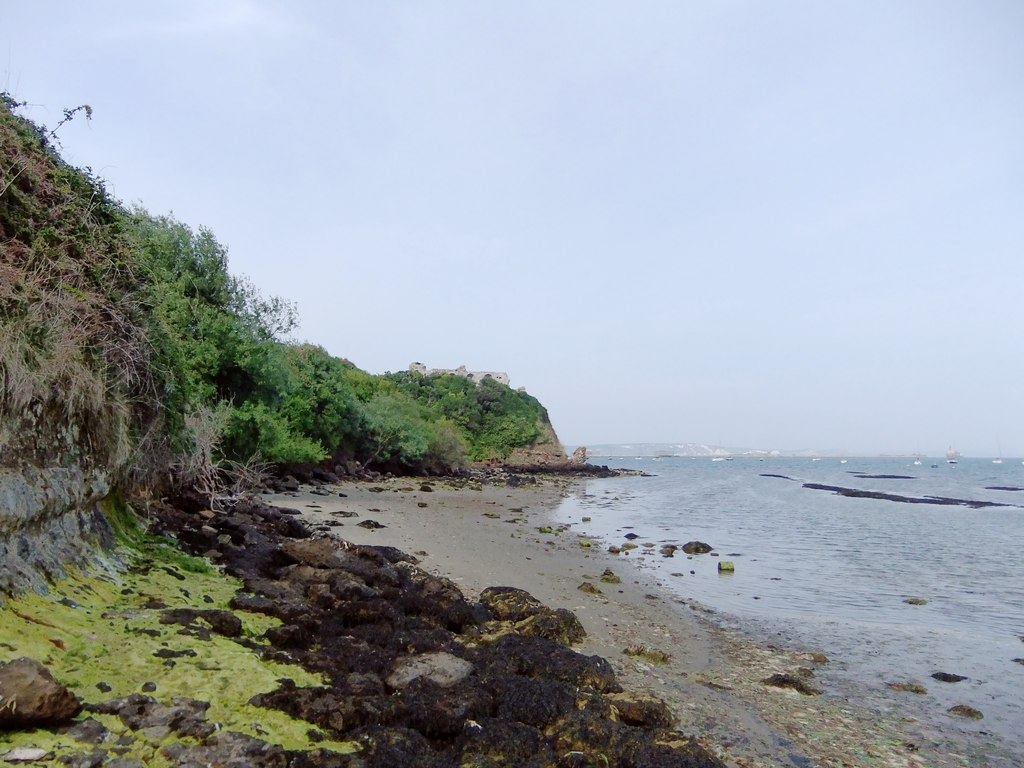
Castle Cove

Castle Cove, also known as Sandsfoot Cove, is a small secluded sand beach to the west of Weymouth, in Dorset, southern England. It is in the parish of Wyke Regis, close to that village but closer to Sandsfoot Castle, one of Henry VIII's Device Forts, built around 1541 opposite its contemporary Portland Castle to protect Portland Roads (principally Weymouth Harbour). It is privately owned, but has remained open to the public and is a favourite spot for swimming, sailing, snorkelling and diving.

Above the beach to one side is the Castle Cove Sailing Club; this began in a clifftop chalet in 1923; it moved to its larger base in 2002. As at 2014 it has over 450 members.

== Amenities ==
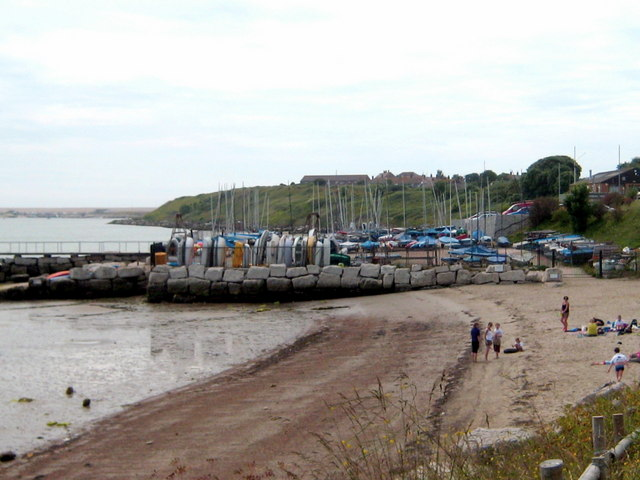
Further along from Castle Cove is another section of beach holding the Castle Cove Sailing Club.

A refreshment kiosk has traded at Castle Cove since 1947. During the 21st century, a fast food outlet was opened on the beach.

== Ownership ==
A previous owner, who ran the Shack café for 18 months, decided to sell the beach by auction, which proved successful in 2012. (Note: This auction took place at The Ageas Bowl, Southampton in 2012, for £90,500). The purchasers of the beach, Lee and Karen Maidment, announced at the time their intention to maintain the beach as a local facility.

Planning permission was granted for eight beach huts to be built here, lapsing in mid-2012.

=== Crowdfunded accessway repair ===
A landslip resulted in the removal of the steps to the beach in February 2013. With no footpath access to the beach, local Green Party member Clare Sutton organised a petition via Change.org seeking to prompt the Borough Council to work with the County Council, local landowners and businesses to find a solution. Launched on 22 March 2014 it took over 1,700 signatures by 7 April. The council's Head of Infrastructure had responded that no funding was available to stabilise the coastline and that it would cost a significant amount of money to rebuild the steps. Sutton and party members organised a public meeting in August 2014 and appealed to the local community to form a pressure group to reopen the steps. The Friends of Castle Cove Beach was formed, with the group becoming a charity three years later. The charity functioned by being inclusive and non-political, and by involving all the communities connected to the beach. They set up a Facebook page which attracted 1,200 supporters, ran social and fundraising events, and started a monthly newsletter. In 2018, the charity leased a strip of land leading to the beach, gained planning permission and started trying to fundraise £35,000. In April 2019, new stairs were installed, through this means. It was opened by Brian Wilkins, who had been using the beach since 1938.

Triple SSSi

The whole of the North shore of Portland Harbour was made a Site of Special Scientific Interest in 1987. In Castle Cove the SSSi is between the closed Underbarn footpath and the mean tide water mark. There are 27 restrictions attached to the SSSi, such as creating a track through it. These restrictions are called a ORNEC (Operations Requiring Natural England's Consent).

== See also ==
- List of Dorset beaches

== Footnotes and citations ==
Notes

Citatation
