= Scrub Island (British Virgin Islands) =

Island of the British Virgin Islands

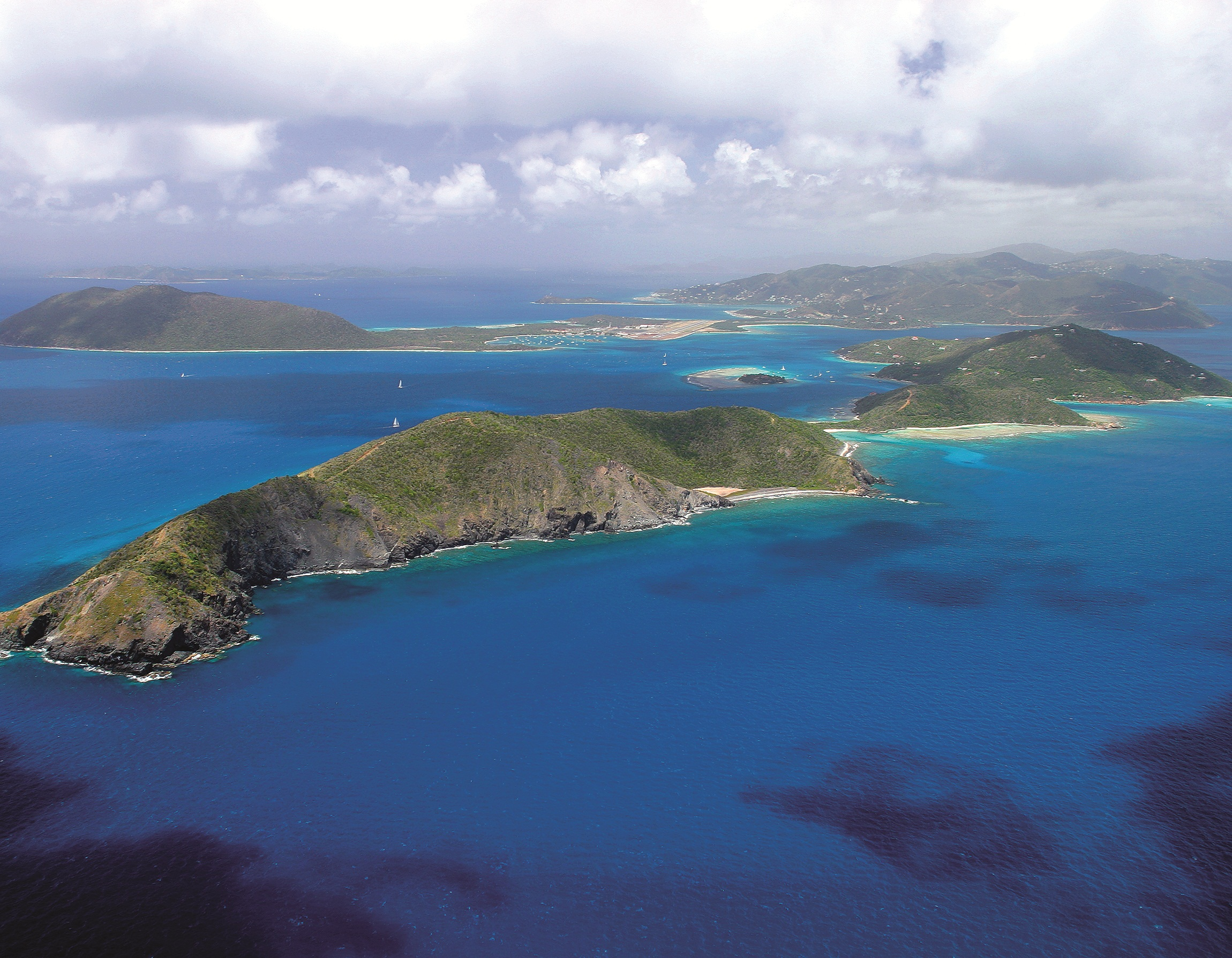
- Scrub Island seen from the northeast

- The location of Scrub Island within the British Virgin Islands

- Location within British Virgin Islands Location within the Caribbean

Geography
- Location: Caribbean Sea
- Coordinates: 18°28′04″N 64°30′45″W
- Archipelago: Virgin Islands

Administration
- United Kingdom
- British Overseas Territory: British Virgin Islands

Additional information
- Time zone: AST (UTC-4)
- ISO code: VG

Scrub Island of the British Virgin Islands in the Caribbean is a part of the Lesser Antilles, a group of islands that are young volcanic or coral islands. It is home to the Scrub Island Resort Marina and Spa.

== Geography ==
Scrub Island is located approximately 74 miles (119 km) east of Puerto Rico (eastern Fajardo, Puerto Rico to Scrub Island), 28 miles (45 km) NE of Charlotte Amalie, St. Thomas of the U.S. Virgin Islands, and 1.66 miles (2.67 km) North of Trellis Bay (Trellis Bay dock and Scrub Island Marina).

Formed by volcanic activity, Scrub Island is 1.6 mi (2.6 km) long and made up of a total 230 acres (0.93 km^{2}) which includes Big Scrub (170 acres (69 ha)) and Little Scrub (60 acres (24 ha)). The mountainous island highest eastern peak reaches 438 feet (134 m) and the highest western peak reaches 313 feet (95 m).

== History ==
Earliest inhabitants that paddled up from South America were recorded about 5000 years ago on Scrub Island. At this time, Scrub was presumably connected to Great Camanoe and Marina Cay Island because sea level was significantly lower. The first record of Territory was claimed by the Arawak Indians who had left traces of Arawak pottery around 200BC, and they were preceded by Ciboney Indians who settled in nearby St. Thomas in 300 BC.

The European discovery of the British Virgin Islands is attributed to Christopher Columbus. During his second voyage on 2 November 1493, small islands now known as the Lesser Antilles were discovered, one of which was Scrub Island. For many years after the discovery, the islands were untouched until privateers, pirates and buccaneers used the island as a haven. Concrete evidence also shows buried pirate treasures. During the early 17th century, the Dutch expressed interest in the copper mines that were discovered, but due to the Dutch’s interest in piracy and a Spanish attack, the settlement was economically unsuccessful. In 1672, the British took control. Presently, Scrub Island is occupied by Scrub Island Resort Marina and Spa which first development in the British Virgin Islands in the last 15 years.

In late 2013 the Scrub Island Resort went into bankruptcy protection in the United States, and was locked in dispute with its primary lender, FirstBank, after receivers were appointed in the British Virgin Islands in relation to unpaid loans made to the Resort. The resort emerged from Chapter 11 bankruptcy protection in November 2015.

== Scrub Island Resort, Spa & Marina ==
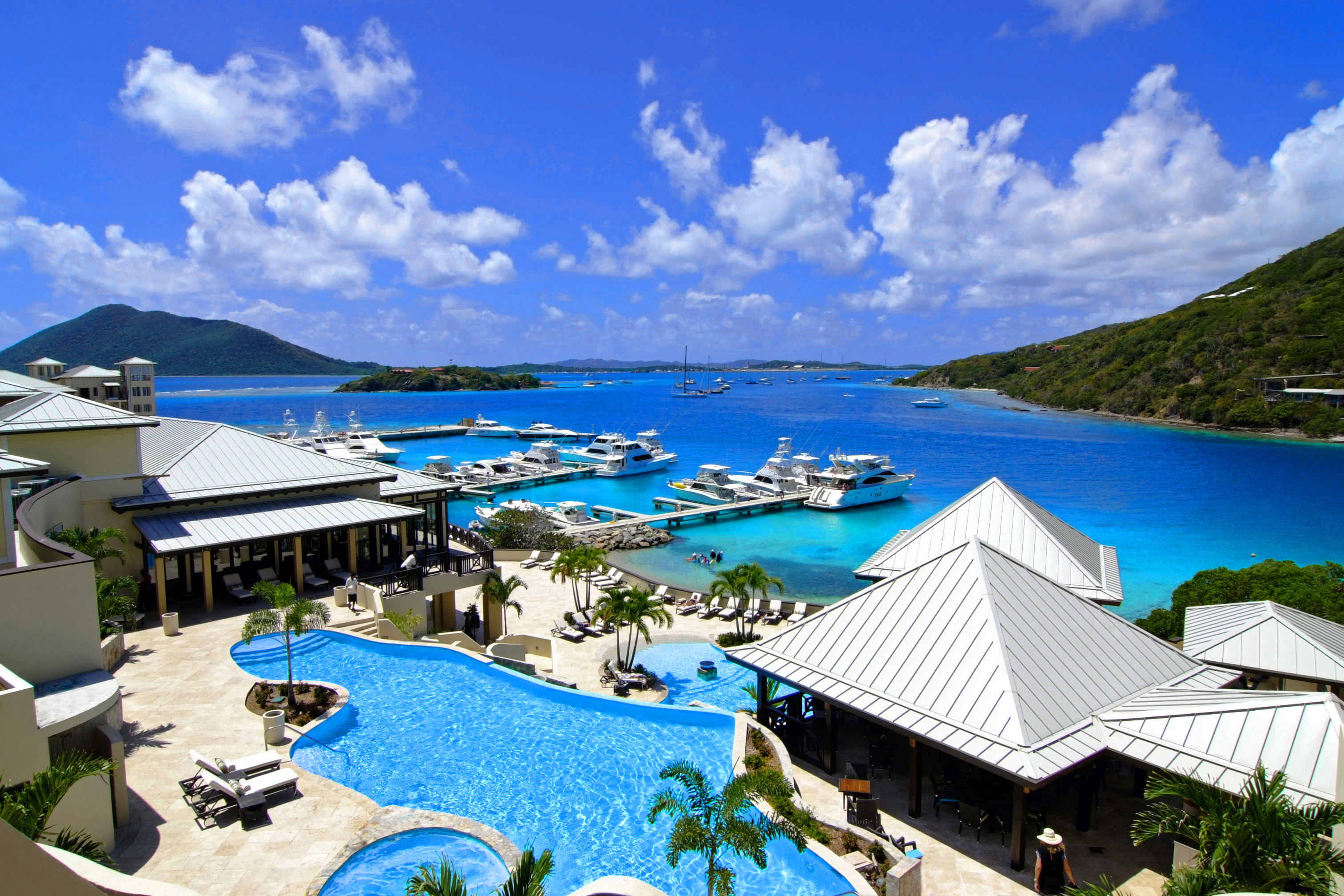
Scrub Island Resort, Spa & Marina

Scrub Island Resort, Spa & Marina is a luxury private island resort built in 2010 and was the first resort development to be built in the British Virgin Islands in more than 15 years. It has 52 guest accommodations as well as a collection of two-, three- and four-bedroom villas, Ixora Spa, restaurants, three private beaches and a 55-slip marina. The master planned resort was designed by architecture firm OBM International USA for Mainsail Development International.

Scrub Island is fringed by three beaches that shelve into the Caribbean Sea. It features protected coves, nature trails and scenery. The island is virtually vehicle-free with resort shuttles serving as the primary form of transportation.

=== Accommodations ===
Scrub Island Resort accommodations consist of 26 guest rooms; 26, one- and two-bedroom suites; and a collection of hillside villas.

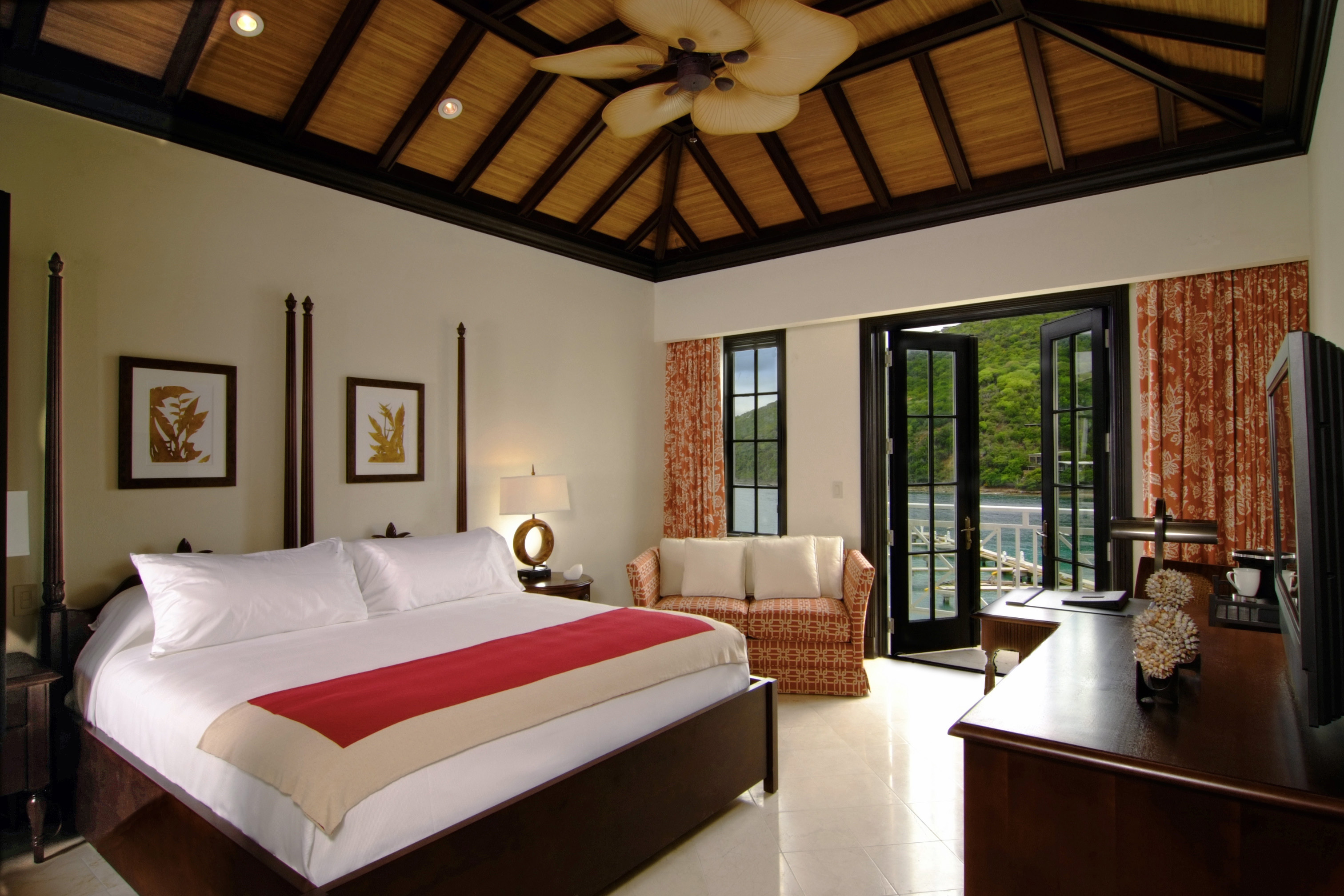
Marina Suite, Scrub Island Resort, Spa & Marina

=== Watersports/Marina ===
Scrub Island Resort’s marina offers 55 slips available for lease or transient docking, including five for mega yachts up to 170 feet.

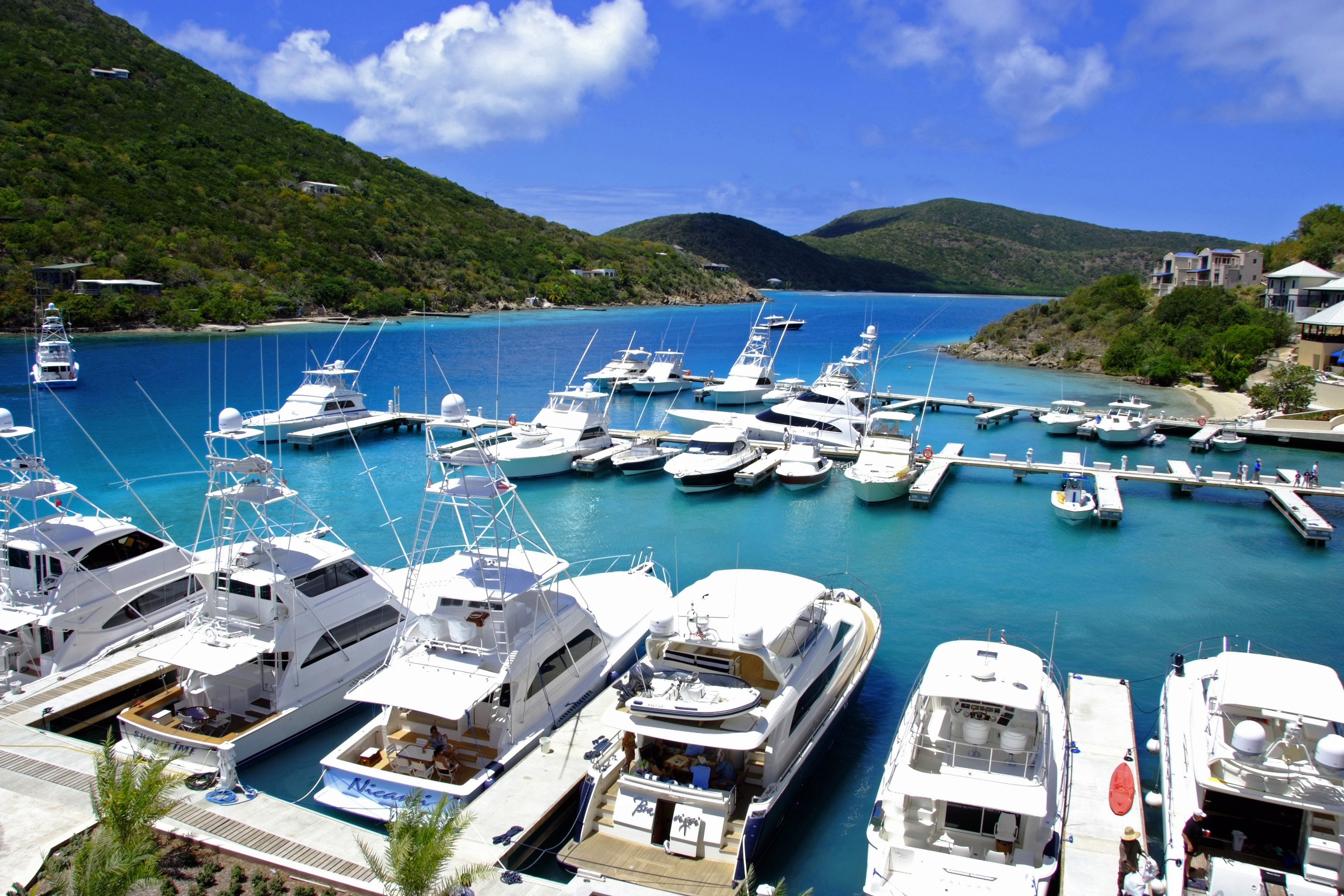
Marina Scrub Island Resort, Spa & Marina

The shallows surrounding Scrub Island, as well as many nearby coves, bays, reefs and inlets, are used by snorkelers and divers.

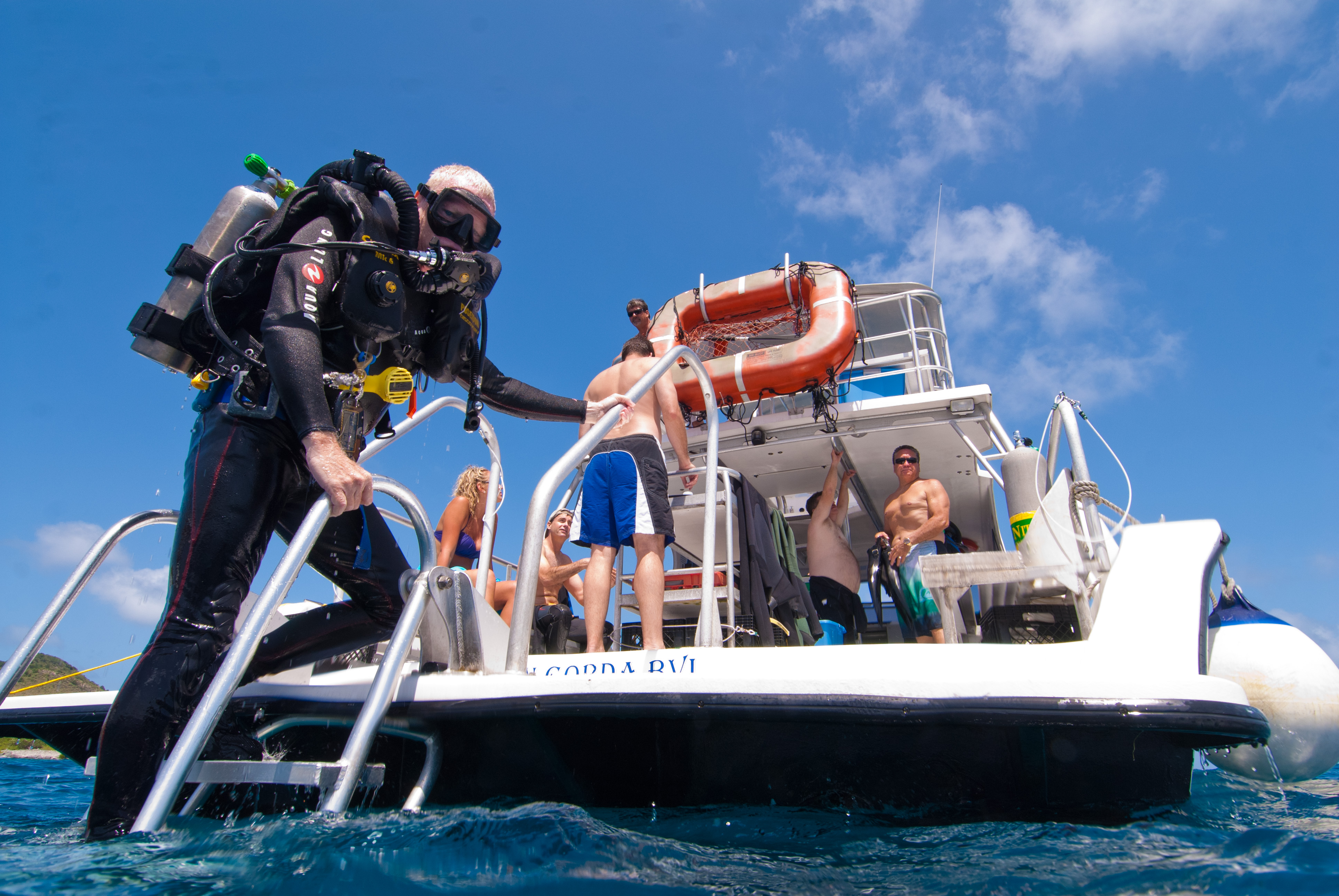
Dive BVI, Scrub Island Resort, Spa & Marina

=== Restaurants and Dining ===
The Resort features a number of restaurants.

=== Bankruptcy ===
On 1 November 2013 the primary lender to the development, FirstBank, sought orders of the Commercial Court in the British Virgin Islands appointing a receiver over the Resort due to the failure by the Resort to make repayments on over US$100 million of loans. The Resort did not comply with the order, but instead sought bankruptcy protection from the U.S. courts, and a Chapter 11 order was made on 20 November 2013. The Resort appeared to have reached an agreement with the bank in relation to the restructuring of the debts, but that agreement collapsed in acrimony in late 2014 with the bank claiming that it had been materially mislead. The resort emerged from Chapter 11 bankruptcy protection in November 2015.

=== Sale ===
In December 2015 it was announced that the Resort would sell the larger currently undeveloped side of the island currently referred to by the Resort as Big Scrub.

=== Travel to Scrub Island ===
The most convenient international airport to Scrub Island is San Juan, Puerto Rico. From San Juan, guests can take a connecting flight with Cape Air, Air Sunshine or Island Birds Air Charters to Beef Island/Tortola (airport code: EIS). Scrub Island is a seven-minute ride from Tortola via the resort’s private launch. Additional options include flights into St. Thomas with a 45-min. ferry ride to Tortola or St. Martin offering convenient connections. Scrub Island also has two heliports available to guests.

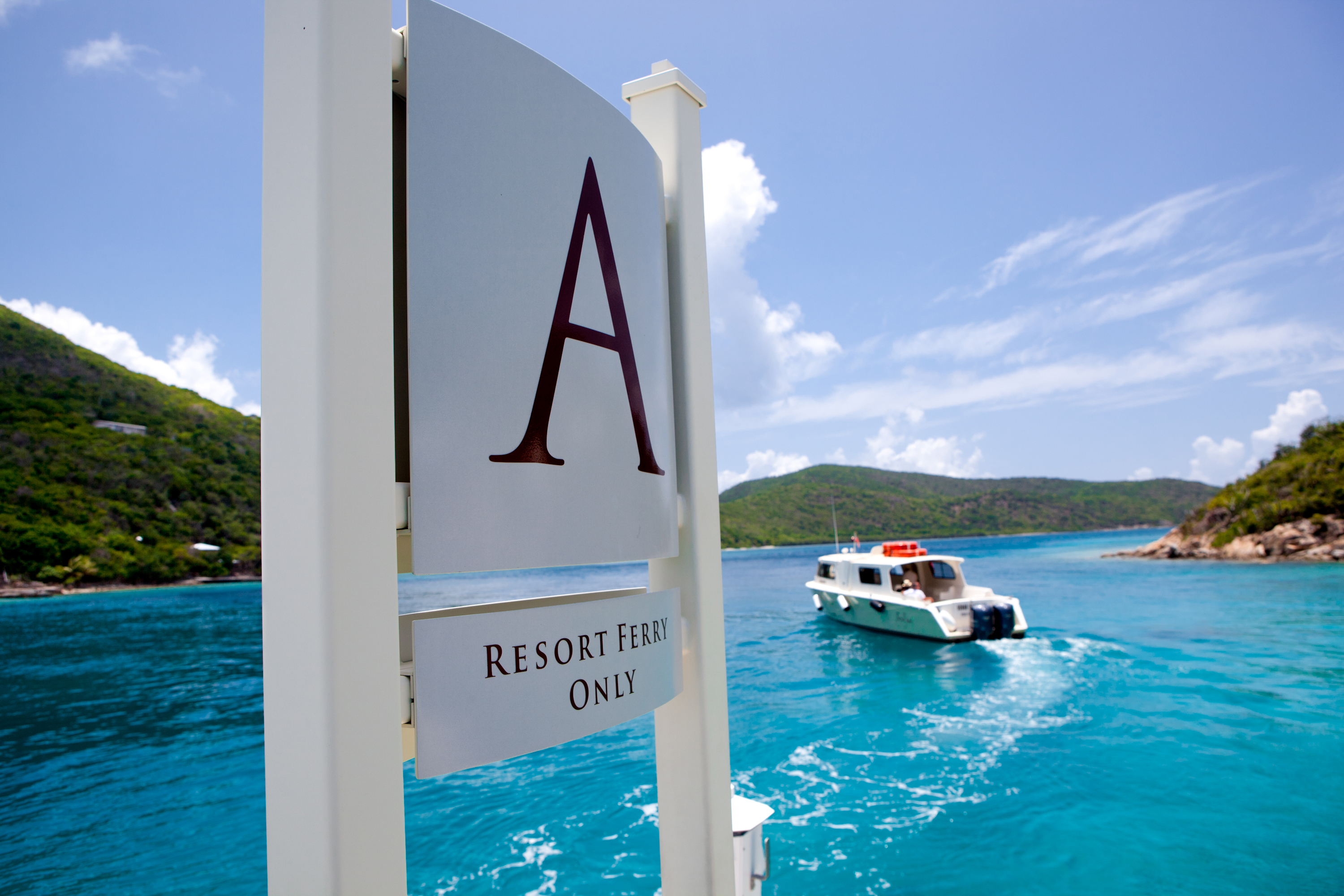
Resort ferry Scrub Island Resort, Spa & Marina

== Other sources ==
Oldendrop, C.G.A. (1987) [1777]. A Caribbean mission: History of the mission of the Evangelical Brethren on the Caribbean islands of St. Tomas, St. Croix, and St. John. Edited and translated by A.R. Highfield and Vladimir Barac. Ann Arbor: Karoma.

Putley, Julian. "A Glimpse of BVI History". The British Virgin Island Tourism Directory 2007: 9.

"Christopher Columbus," Microsoft Encarta Online Encyclopedia 2007
