= King Edward VII Memorial Hospital =

Geography
- Location: Stanley, Falkland Islands
- Coordinates: 51.6920°S 57.8682°W

Organisation
- Care system: Tax funded

Services
- Beds: 29

Links
- Website: FIG webpage

The King Edward VII Memorial Hospital in Stanley, Falkland Islands is the base for the Falkland Islands Government Health Service.

Health services are funded by fish licence revenue and by income tax. They are entirely free at the point of delivery to Islands residents and to British residents under a reciprocal health agreement. In 2003, the provision of the service cost £950 per head of population per year, similar to the cost in the UK. Services are provided to about 3,000 residents. The military base provides its own health care, but makes use of the hospital facilities as necessary.

The King Edward VII Memorial Hospital is the only hospital on the Islands. All the islands' medical, dental and community health services are based there. There are 18 acute beds, one maternity bed, a single bedded isolation unit, a two bedded intensive care unit and seven long-stay nursing beds. In April 1984, a fire destroyed an earlier wooden construction of the hospital, killing seven patients and one nurse, Barbara Chick. She was later posthumously awarded a Queen's Commendation for Brave Conduct.

The hospital must be entirely self-sufficient and takes referrals from Tristan da Cunha, South Georgia, and Antarctica. Before 1982 medical services on the islands were very basic, but there has been considerable investment since. Colorectal cancer was particularly common on the islands, linked to a very unusual gene mutation and a three-yearly colorectal screening programme was introduced in 1997.

There are five full-time GPs and one part-time. A consultant surgeon and consultant anaesthetist do four month tours of duty on the Islands. A radiographer, a biomedical scientist, and a dental hygienist are seconded from NHS trusts. There are two practice nurses, a part-time nurse practitioner, two casualty nurses, ward nurses and healthcare assistants. The GPs have to provide all medical care apart from surgery or anaesthesia, supported by visiting specialists, mostly from the UK who help to keep them up to date. Consultations take place by telephone for patients in remote locations. There are three midwives, and about 30 babies are born each year. There are weekly visits by GPs to patients outside Stanley. Remote rural patients are provided with a "medicine chest" so doctors can instruct them to take medications based on remote consultations. Patients, or doctors, can be transported by the Falkland Islands Government Air Service if necessary. Serious emergencies are taken to Uruguay.

Dr Rebecca Edwards is the chief medical officer. They use EMIS software for medical records.

Sir Jack Hayward contributed to the repairs of the hospital after the 1982 Falklands War.

In 2022 the first assisted living facility for the islands, to be called Tussac House, was commissioned from Scotframe in Inverurie. It will have 32 extra care apartments made up of one and two-bedroom units, as well as single bed, short-term accommodation. It is intended to free up much needed capacity in the hospital.
