= Cape Dolphin =

Most northerly point on East Falkland, Falkland Islands

Coordinates: 51.2436°S 58.9574°W

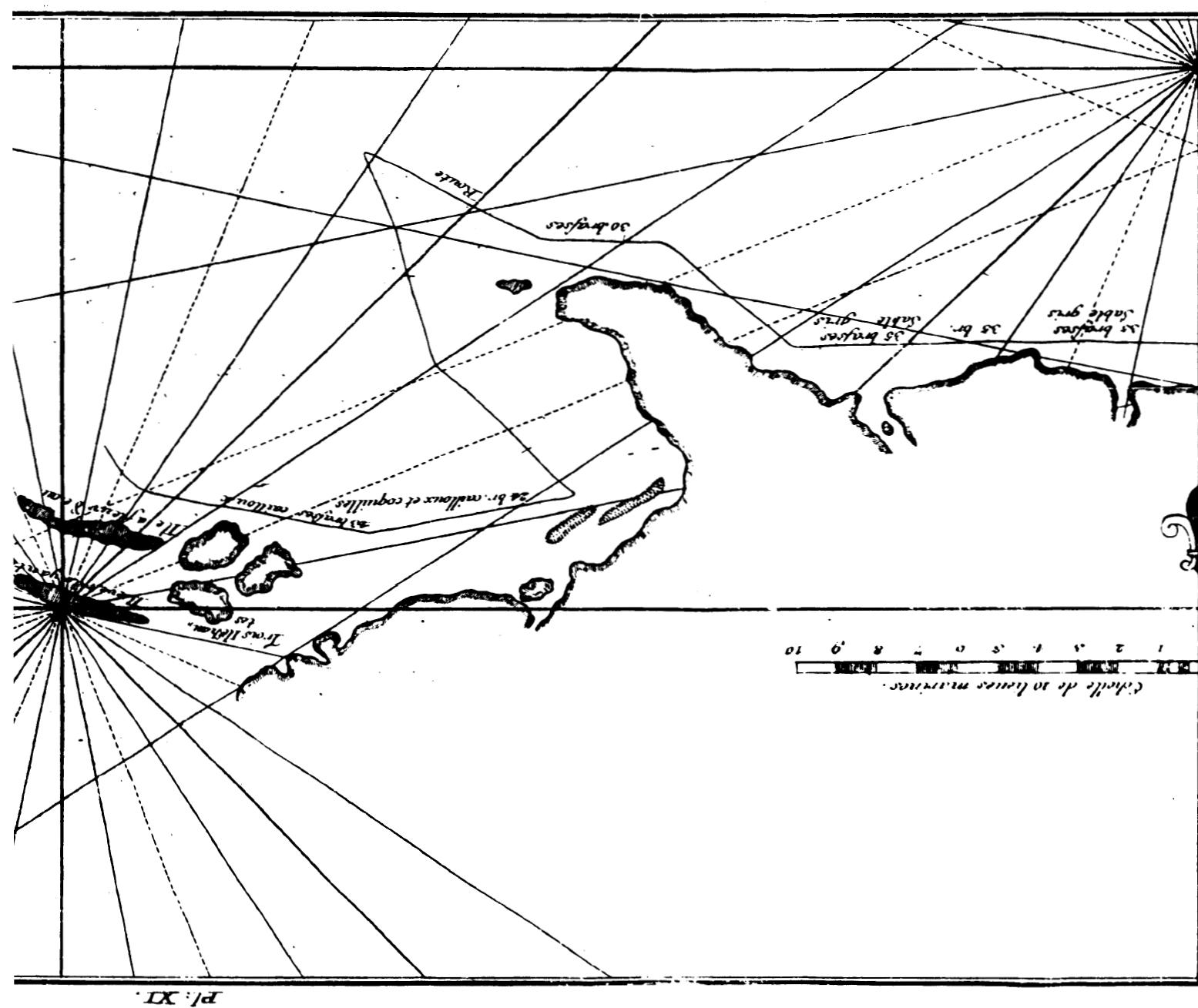
Early mapping of Cape Dolphin (Dom Pernety, 1769)

Cape Dolphin (Spanish: "Cabo Leal") is the most northerly point on East Falkland, Falkland Islands. It is the most northerly point of the two main islands, East and West Falkland, but many of the smaller islands, such as the Jason Islands are further north. Eddystone Rock is located 7.6 kilometres northwest of Cape Dolphin.
