= Nordenskjöld Glacier =

Glacier in Antarctica

Nordenskjold Glacier
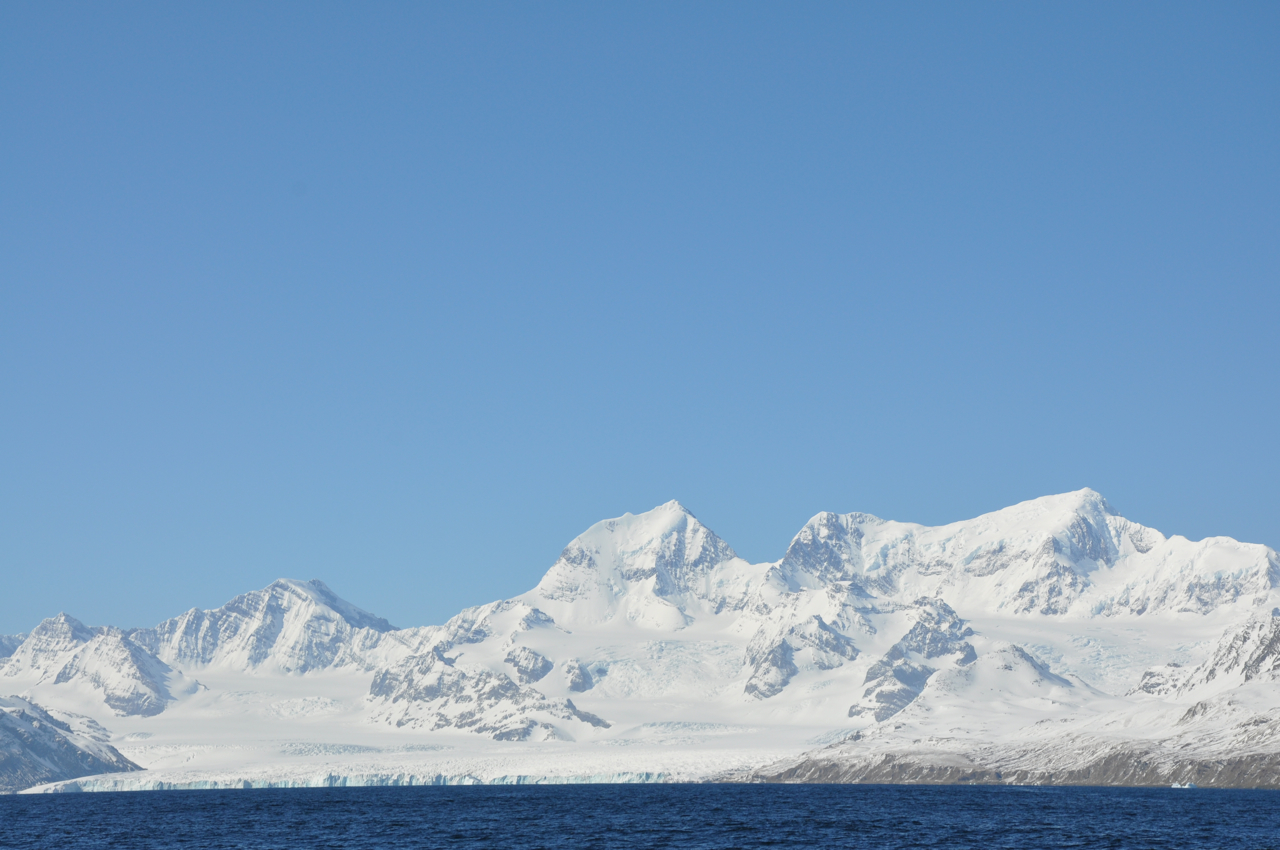
- View of the glacier terminus at Cumberland Bay.

- Location within South Georgia Island
- Location: South Georgia and the South Sandwich Islands
- Coordinates: 54°22′S 36°22′W
- Terminus: Cumberland East Bay; Southern Ocean

Nordenskjöld Glacier is a large glacier in South Georgia.

The glacier flows north and has its terminus at the head of Cumberland East Bay, on the north coast of the island. It was charted by the Swedish Antarctic Expedition and named after Otto Nordenskjöld, leader of the expedition. Sheridan Peak sits near the glacier's head.

== See also ==
- List of glaciers in the Antarctic
- Glaciology
