= Cumberland Bay =

Bay in South Georgia

Coordinates: 54°14′S 36°28′W

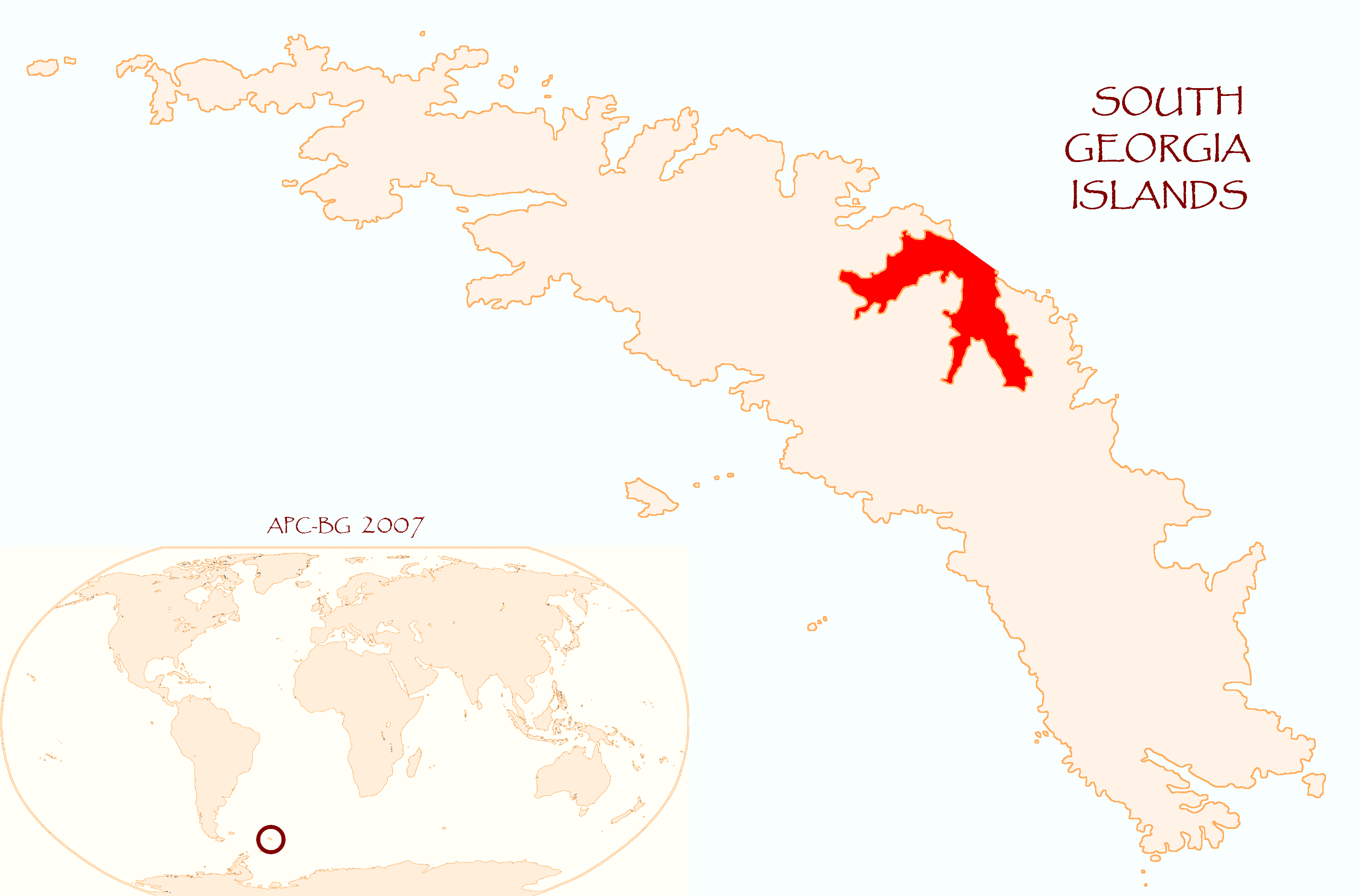

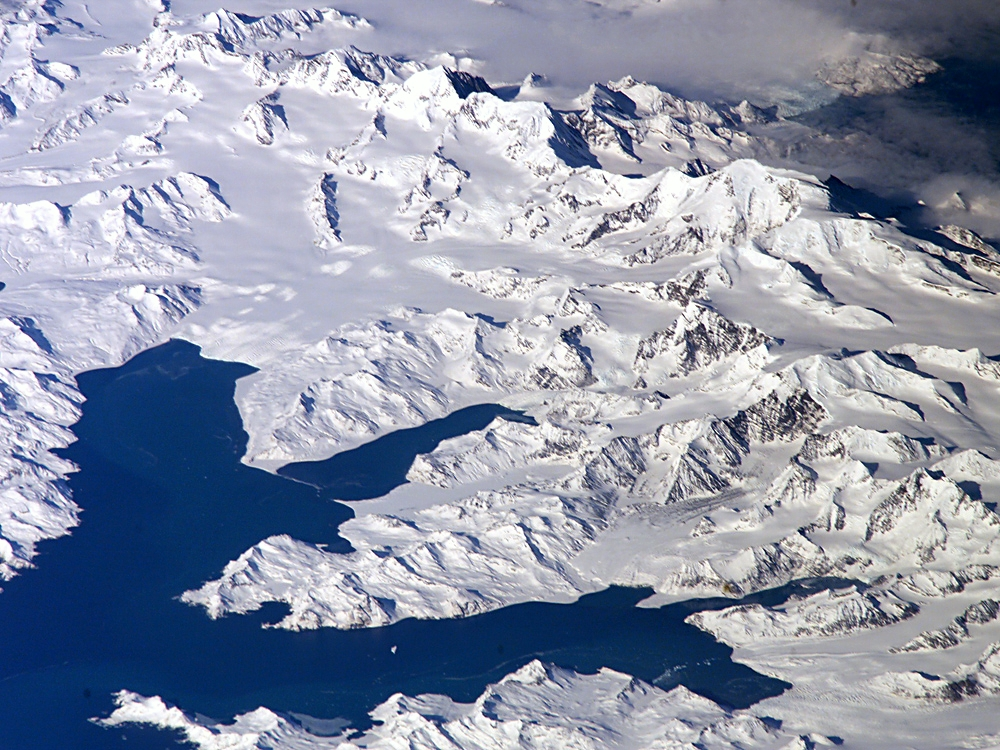
Central South Georgia: Cumberland Bay; Thatcher Peninsula with King Edward Cove (Grytviken) in the lower center.

Cumberland Bay is a bay, 4 miles (6.4 km) wide at its entrance between Larsen Point and Barff Point, which separates into two extensive arms, Cumberland West Bay and Cumberland East Bay, which recede inland 9 miles (14 km) along the northern coast of South Georgia. It was discovered and named in 1775 by a British expedition under James Cook.

In the Second World War the whaling stations were closed except Grytviken and Leith Harbour. Most of the British and Norwegian whalers and factory ships were destroyed by German merchant raiders, and the remainder were called up to serve under Allied command. The resident British Magistrates (W. Barlas and A.I. Fleuret) attended to the island's defence throughout the War. The Royal Navy deployed the armed merchant cruiser Queen of Bermuda to patrol South Georgian and Antarctic waters, and deployed two four-inch guns to protect key approaches: at Grytviken to protect Cumberland Bay and at Leith Harbour to protect Stromness Bay. The batteries still survive. They were manned by volunteers from among the Norwegian whalers who were trained for the purpose.
