= Cumberland East Bay =

Coordinates: 54°17′S 36°26′W

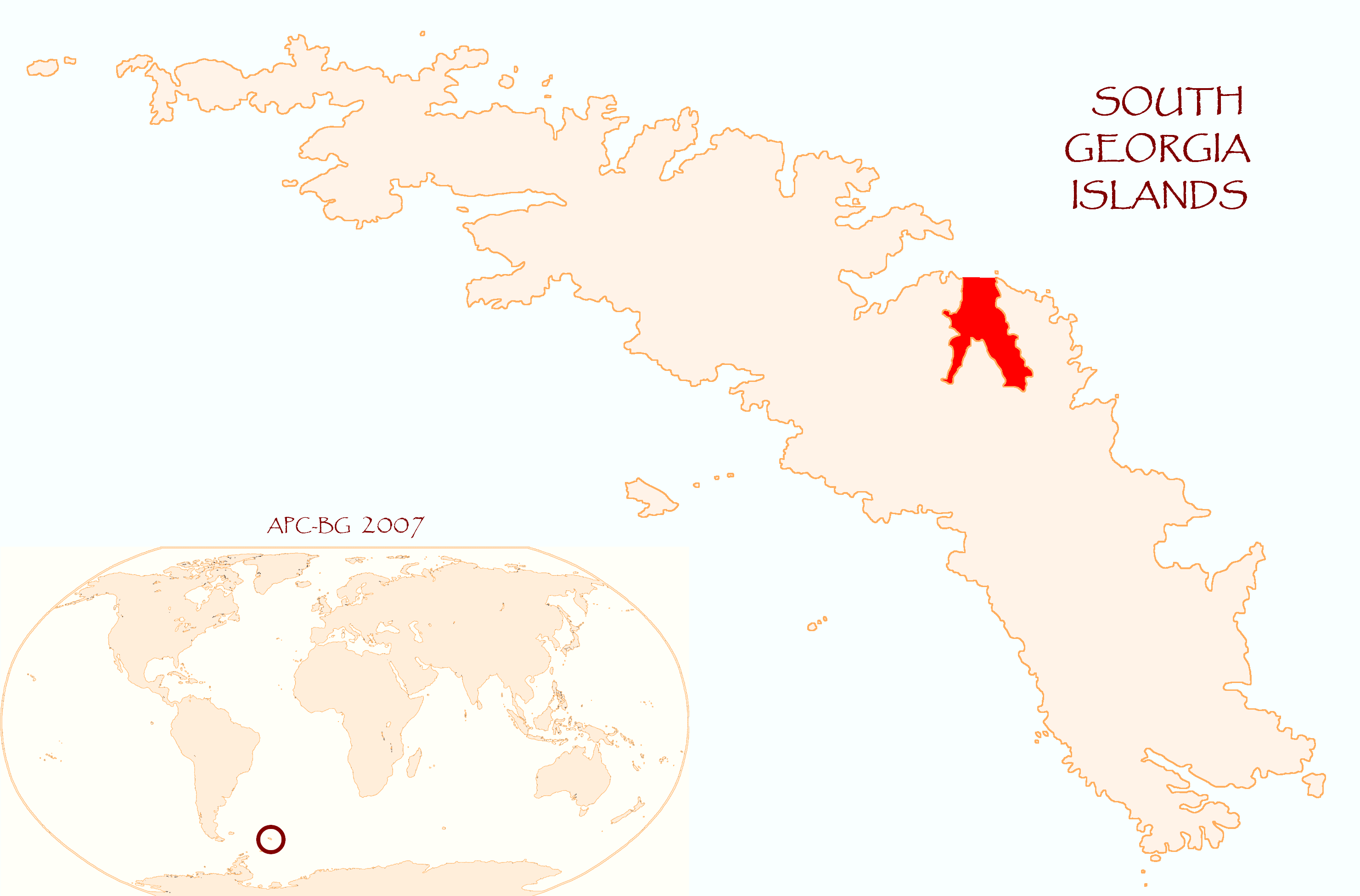

Cumberland East Bay is a bay forming the eastern arm of Cumberland Bay, South Georgia. It is entered between Sappho Point on Thatcher Peninsula and Barff Point on Barff Peninsula. It is nearly 3 miles (4.8 km) wide, and extends 8 miles (13 km) in a southeast direction.

== History ==
This feature was first surveyed by the Swedish Antarctic Expedition, 1901–04, who named it "South Bay". It was remapped during 1926–29 by Discovery Investigations personnel and renamed "East Cumberland Bay", which is more descriptive of its geographic position. The shortened form "East Bay" was simultaneously used. Following the South Georgia Survey, 1951–52, the UK Antarctic Place-Names Committee proposed that the name be altered to Cumberland East Bay and that all other names be rejected. This change brings together information about the whole of Cumberland Bay in one place in indexes, and will avoid confusion with East Bay in Prince Olav Harbour, South Georgia.

On 22–24 April 1982, during the Falklands War, the British Special Boat Service attempted to cross Cumberland East Bay. They had landed in Hound Bay, and traversed the Sörling Valley, but were prevented from attacking Argentine positions by incessant ice and snow.

== Major features ==
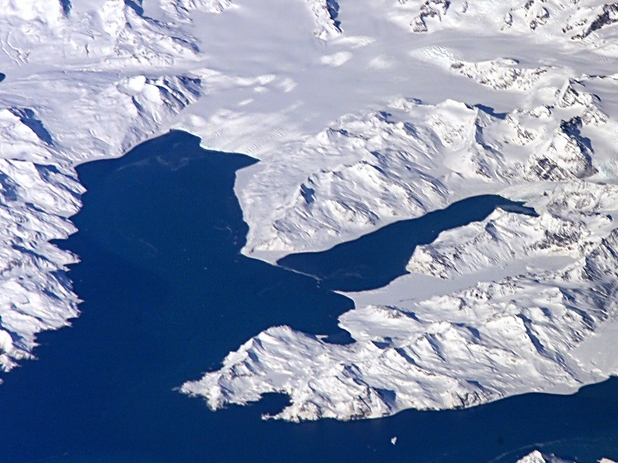
Cumberland East Bay with Thatcher Peninsula in the foreground

Many features within the bay have been individually charted and named by various Antarctic expeditions and surveys.

=== Western coast ===
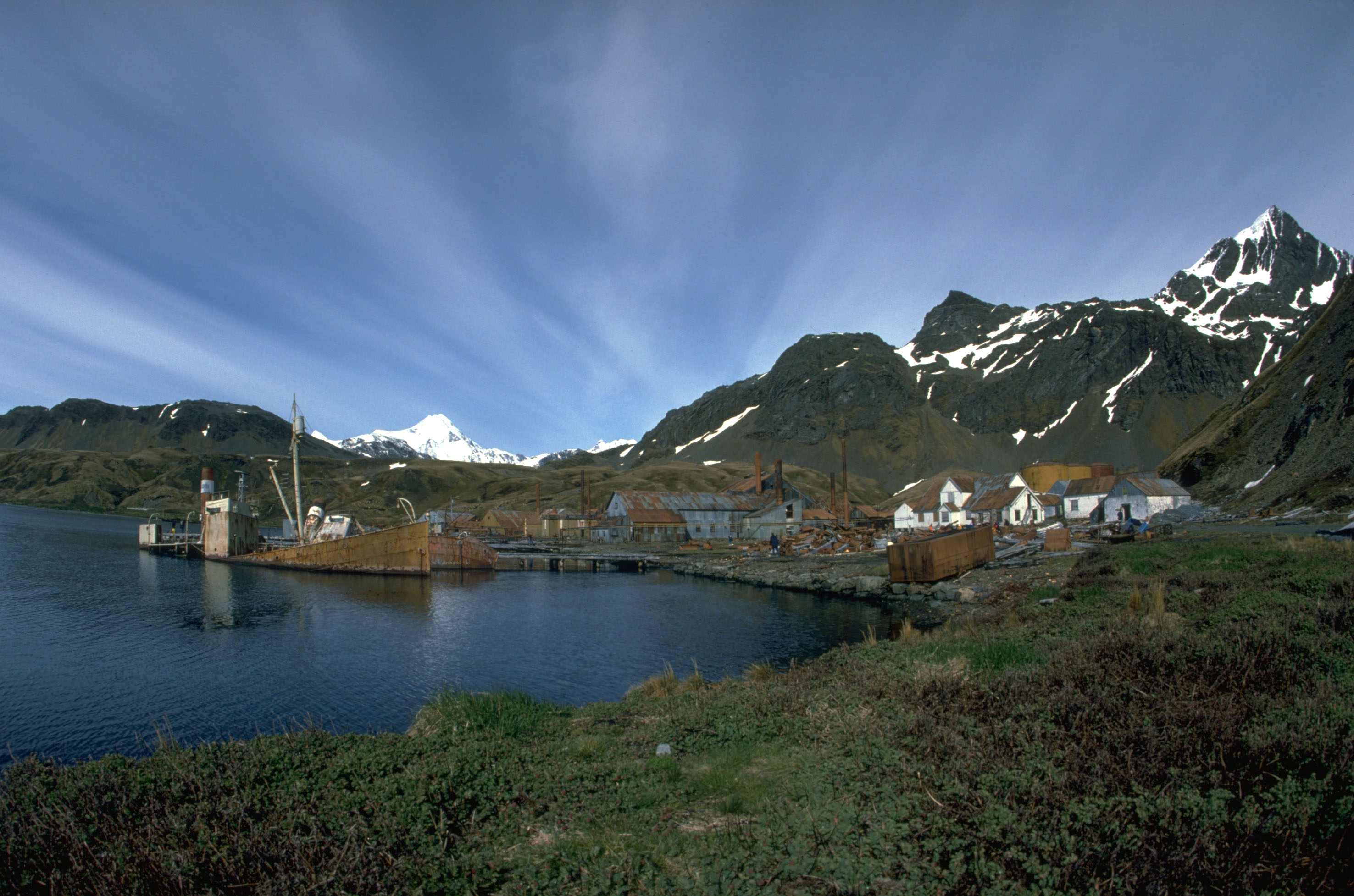
Whaling station Grytviken is in King Edward Cove, on the western shore of Cumberland East Bay

The western headland of the bay is Sappho Point on Thatcher Peninsula. Working south along the west coast, the next major feature is King Edward Cove, approximately 2.2 nmi (4 km) southwest. South of that, the glacial plain Hestesletten extends from inland out to the coast. Moraine Fjord forms the west head of the bay, separated from it by Greene Peninsula. Nordenskjöld Glacier flows into the head of the main portion of Cumberland East Bay.

=== Eastern coast ===
The bay is defined to the east by Barff Peninsula, culminating in Barff Point to the north. Along that coast, the small cove Sandebugten forms the west end of Reindeer Valley. The name "Sandebugten" appears on a 1929 British Admiralty chart but probably was applied earlier by Norwegian whalers operating from South Georgia.
