= Moraine Fjord =

Fjord in South Georgia

Coordinates: 54°19′S 36°29′W

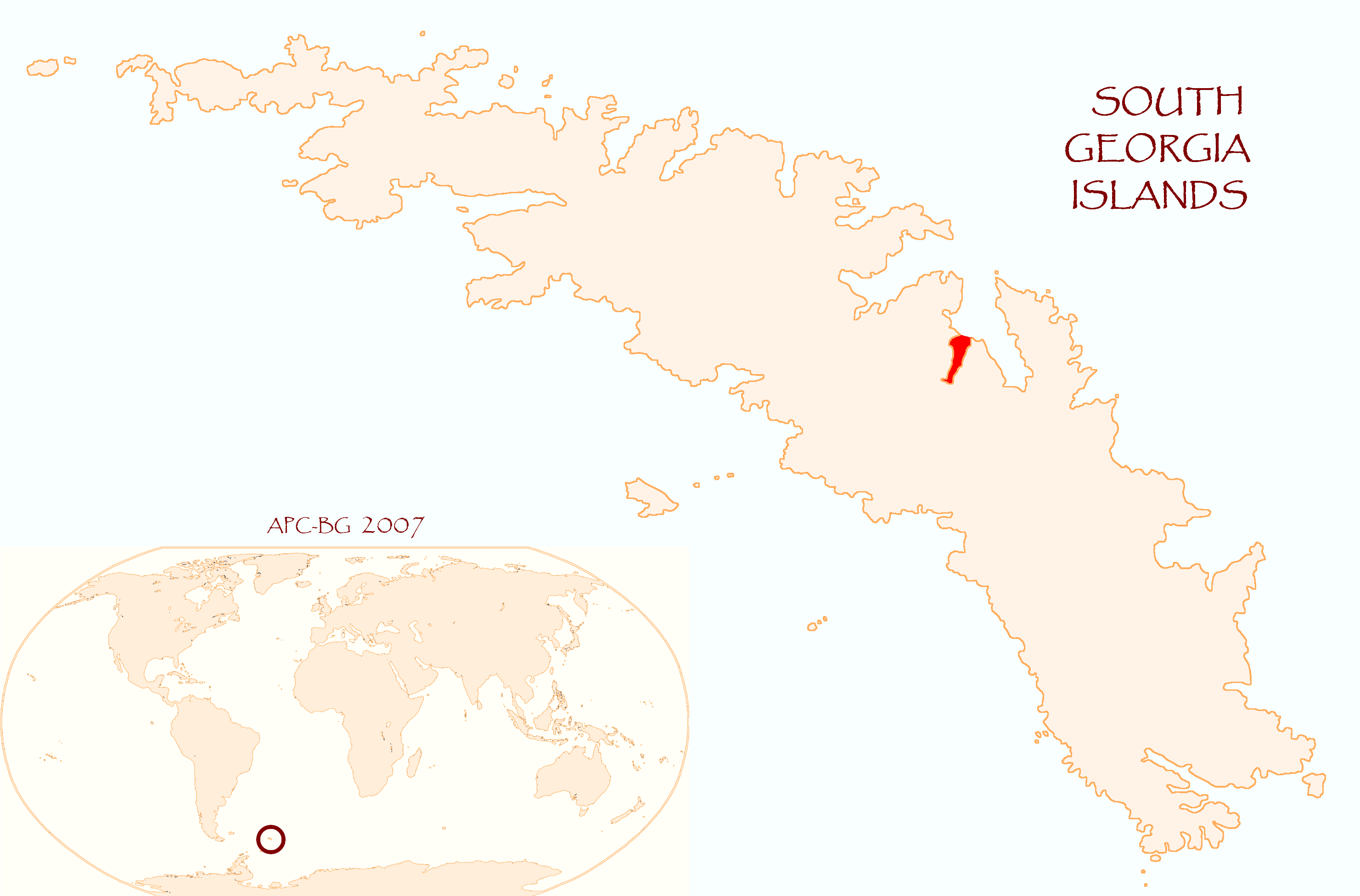
Location of Moraine Fjord

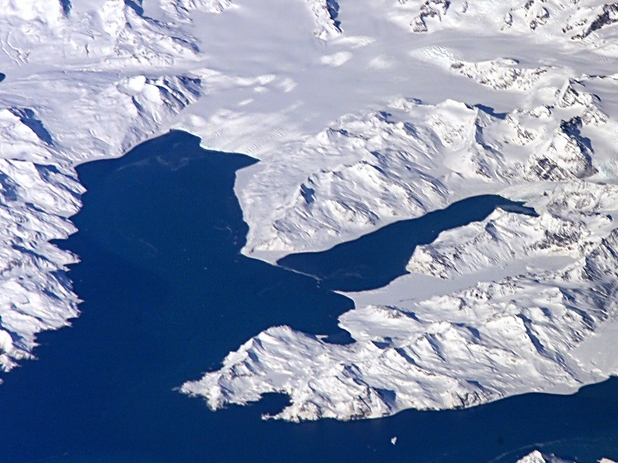
Cumberland East Bay; Moraine Fjord is to the right, between Greene Peninsula and Thatcher Peninsula

Moraine Fjord is an inlet 3.5 nautical miles (6 km; 4 mi) long with a reef (a terminal moraine) extending across its entrance, forming the west head of Cumberland East Bay, South Georgia. It was charted by the Swedish Antarctic Expedition under Otto Nordenskjöld, 1901–04, who so named it because of the large glacial moraine at its entrance.

Discovery Point, formed by glacial moraine, marks the west side of the fjord's entrance. Also surveyed by SAE, it was probably named by Discovery Investigations personnel in the period following their surveys of 1926–31, presumably for their organization or their ships, the Discovery or Discovery II, which were utilized in the surveys of South Georgia.

Carcelles Peak is a peak rising above 1,065 metres (3,500 ft) immediately south of the head of Moraine Fjord. It was surveyed by the South Georgia Survey (SGS) in the period 1951–57, and named by the UK Antarctic Place-Names Committee (UK-APC) for Alberto Carcelles, who made biological collections on South Georgia for the Museo Nacional de Buenos Aires.
