= Harker =

Harker may refer to:

== People ==
- Harker (surname)

== Municipalities ==
- Harker, Cumbria, north of Carlisle, England
- Harker, Florida, census-designated place located in Collier County, Florida
- Harkers Island, North Carolina, census-designated place in Carteret County, North Carolina
- Harker Heights, Texas, city in Bell County, Texas

== Buildings ==
- Fort Harker (Alabama), military fortification built during the American Civil War
- Fort Harker (Kansas), military installation of the US Army from 1866 to 1872
- The Harker School, private educational institution in San Jose, California, USA

== Geographical features ==
=== Watercourses ===
- Harker Creek (disambiguation), the names of several creeks in the USA
- Harker's Run (Ohio), stream located in Preble County, Ohio, USA
- Harker Run (West Virginia), stream located in Wetzel County, West Virginia, USA

=== Lakes ===
- Harker Lake, shallow glacial lake in Kidder County, North Dakota, USA
- Upper Harker Lake, shallow glacial lake located in Kidder County, North Dakota, USA
- Harker Park Lake, lake located in Rio Blanco County, Colorado, USA

=== Land features ===
- Harker Canyon (disambiguation), several canyons of that name in the USA
- Harker Point on Bristol Island in the South Sandwich Islands
- Mount Harker in Antarctica
- Harker Glacier on the island of South Georgia

=== Extraterrestrial ===
- Dorsa Harker, wrinkle ridge in Mare Crisium on the Moon

== Video games ==
- Harker (video game)

== See also ==
- Harkness (disambiguation)
- Hark (disambiguation)
- Harke & Burr, fictional comic book characters
- Harkers, York, pub in England
