= Harker (surname) =

Harker is an English surname.

Some genealogical records show that the origin of Harker comes from the North-West regions of England - North of the Lake District. Speculation is that Harker is the result of the combination of Romanized hyphenation of the surnames Hart or Hare and Kerr. (Hart - a type of stag; Hare - a rabbit; Kerr - a marshland.) It is also assumed that the Harker family were Romanized subjects who lived on both sides of Hadrian's Wall in that area.

Harkers can be found mostly in Northern England. In the United States, there are concentrations of Harkers living in communities across the Rocky Mountains from Mexico to Canada. They are mostly descendants from Mormon Pioneers which dispersed from Cove Fort, Utah to settle the Western frontier as called and assigned by Mormon leaders in the late 19th century.

== Individuals ==
- Al Harker (1910–2006), American soccer player
- Alfred Harker (petrologist) (1859–1939), English geologist and petrologist
- Billy Harker (1910–1973), English footballer
- Caroline Harker (born 1966), English actress
- Charles Garrison Harker (1837–1864), Brigadier General of the Union Army in the American Civil War
- Chris Harker, Representative for Oregon's House District 34
- Cyril Harker (1899–1970), New Zealand politician
- Donald Harker, Archbishop of the Anglican Diocese of George in South Africa
- F. Flaxington Harker (1876–1936), American composer
- George R. Harker, author and self-styled "cyberspace philosopher"
- Gordon Harker (1885–1967), English film actor
- Harry Harker (1887–1961), Australian footballer
- Howard Harker, World War I flying ace
- John Harker, former CEO of InFocus
- Margaret Harker (1920–2013), British photographer and historian of photography
- Oswald Allen Harker, (1886–1968), Acting Director General of MI5 from 1940 to 1941
- Patrick T. Harker, President of the University of Delaware
- Skouson Harker (born 1977), Canadian basketball player
- Susannah Harker (born 1965), English actress
- Wiley Harker, actor, Crane Tolliver in the soap opera General Hospital
- William Harker (1819–1905), wool merchant, banker and Liberal politician who represented Ripon
- William Harker (slave trader), Maryland, U.S.

== Fictional characters ==
- Anthony Harker, fictional character portrayed by Adam Astill in Doctors
- Harker Fleet, fictional character portrayed by George Peppard in One More Train to Rob
- Jonathan Harker, fictional character in the 1897 horror novel Dracula by Bram Stoker
- Lee Harker, fictional character portrayed by Maika Monroe in Longlegs
- Mina Harker, fictional character in the 1897 horror novel Dracula by Bram Stoker
- Kay Harker, fictional character, the young hero of the books The Midnight Folk and The Box of Delights by John Masefield
- Quincy Harker, fictional character in the Marvel Universe based on a character in Bram Stoker's Dracula
- Sard Harker, fictional character (Chisholm 'Sardonic' Harker) in the 1924 novel of the same name by John Masefield.
