= Hark =

Hark is from a Middle English word "herken", meaning to listen carefully. It may refer to:

== Geography ==
- Hark, Byzantine name for the Muş Province area of Turkey
- "The Hark" (Harkness Commons), a Gropius building on the Harvard Law School campus

== Music ==
=== Albums ===
- Hark (album), a 1985 album by clarinetist Buddy DeFranco, with the Oscar Peterson quartet
- Hark! Songs for Christmas - Vol. II, a 2006 album by Sufjan Stevens
- Hark! The Village Wait, a 1970 album by the folk rock band Steeleye Span
- Hark!, a 1992 album by Richard Stoltzman
- Hark! (The Doppelgangaz album), 2013
- Hark! (Andrew Bird album), a 2020 album by Andrew Bird

=== Songs ===
- "Hark! The Herald Angels Sing", Christmas carol by Charles Wesley
- "Hark The Sound", the alma mater song of the University of North Carolina
- "Hark", a song by Buddy DeFranco from the 1985 album Hark

== People ==
=== Given name ===
- Hark Bohm (1939–2025), German actor, screenwriter, film director, playwright and professor for cinema studies
- Hark Olufs (1708–1754), Frisian sailor
- Tsui Hark (born 1950), Hong Kong film director

=== Surname ===
- Lisa Hark, nutritionist and consultant for the BBC TV series, Honey, We're Killing the Kids
- Sabine Hark (born 1962), German sociologist

== Other uses ==
- Hark At Barker, a 1969 British sitcom starring Ronnie Barker
- HARKing, Hypothesizing After the Results are Known, an error in research design
- Hark, a 2019 novel by author Sam Lipsyte

== See also ==
- Harke & Burr, fictional comic book characters
- Harker (disambiguation)
- Harkes, a surname
- Harkness (disambiguation)
