= George Harker =

George Harker may refer to:

- George Harker (Australian politician) (1816–1879), businessman and politician in colonial Victoria (Australia)
- George Harker (scientist) (1878–1957), Australian scientist and inventor
- George R. Harker, author and self-styled "cyberspace philosopher"
