= Lake Vida =

Hypersaline, permanently ice-covered lake in Antarctica

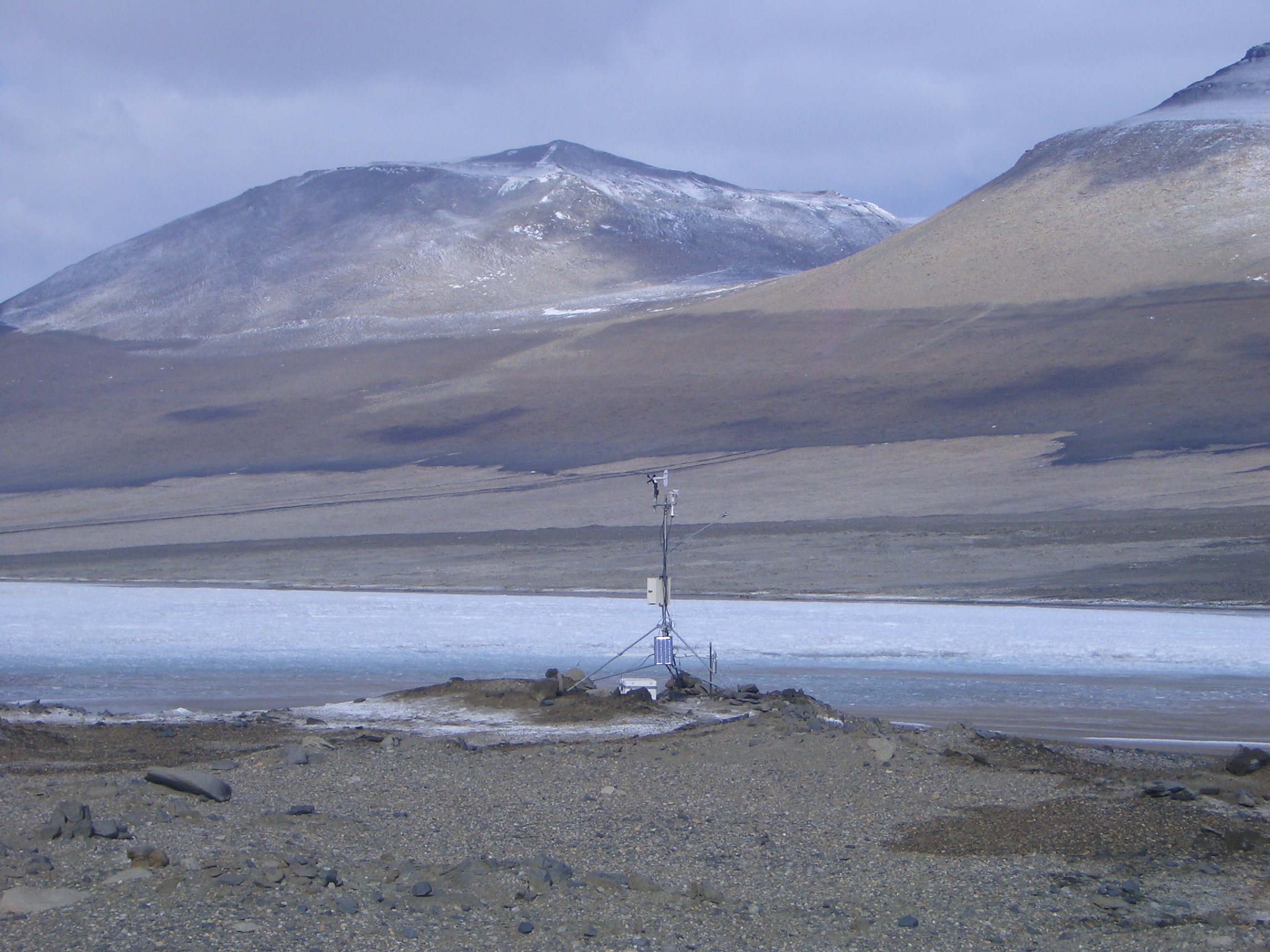
- Lake Vida, showing ice cover and surrounding Dry Valley terrain. Picture taken in 2012.

- Location within Antarctica

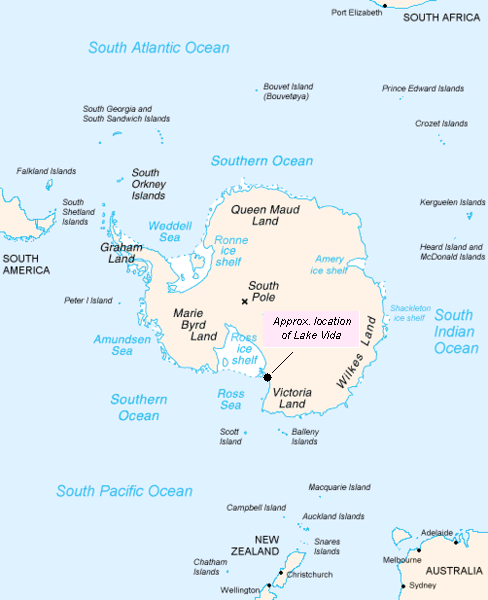
- Map of approximate location
- Coordinates: 77°23′S 161°56′E
- Lake type: Endorheic
- Primary inflows: Victoria River, Kite Stream, Dune Creek
- Primary outflows: none
- Catchment area: Vida Basin
- Basin countries: (Antarctica)
- Max. length: 5.4 km (3.4 mi)
- Max. width: 1.7 km (1.1 mi)
- Surface area: 6.8 km^{2} (2.6 sq mi)
- Average depth: undetermined
- Max. depth: undetermined
- Water volume: undetermined
- Surface elevation: 349 m (1,145 ft)
- Islands: 0 (none)
- Settlements: Lake Vida Camp

Lake Vida is a hypersaline lake in Victoria Valley, the northernmost of the large McMurdo Dry Valleys, on the continent of Antarctica. It is isolated under year-round ice cover, and is considerably more saline than seawater. It came to public attention in 2002 when microbes frozen in its ice cover for more than 2,800 years were successfully thawed and reanimated.

== Introduction ==
Lake Vida is one of the largest lakes in the McMurdo Dry Valley region and is a closed-basin endorheic lake. Notably, the permanent surface ice on the lake is the thickest non-glacial ice on earth, reaching a depth of at least 21 metres (69 ft). The ice at depth is saturated with brine that is seven times as saline as seawater. The high salinity allows the brine to remain liquid at an average yearly water temperature of −13 °C (9 °F). The ice cap has sealed the saline brine from external air and water for thousands of years, creating a time capsule for ancient DNA. This combination of lake features makes Lake Vida a unique lacustrine ecosystem on Earth.

The lake gained widespread recognition in December 2002 when a research team, led by the University of Illinois at Chicago's Peter Doran, announced the discovery of 2,800‑year‑old halophile microbes (primarily filamentous cyanobacteria) preserved in ice layer core samples drilled in 1996. The microbes reanimated upon thawing, grew and reproduced. Due to this discovery and the freezing mechanisms forming Lake Vida's ice-seal, Lake Vida is now noted as a location for research into Earth's climate and life under extreme conditions, specifically the fauna that could have existed on Mars. The unmanned Lake Vida Meteorological Station monitors climate conditions around the lake year round for such scientific study.

A 2010 field campaign, funded by the National Science Foundation through the American Recovery and Reinvestment Act of 2009, to investigate the microbiology and geochemistry of Lake Vida. Led by Peter Doran and Alison Murray from Nevada's Desert Research Institute, the expedition recovered ice cores, brine and sediment samples from the lake using clean drilling procedures to avoid contamination.

The lake itself has no permanent settlements or infrastructure. The nearby Lake Vida Meteorological Station is unmanned, sending meteorological data to McMurdo Dry Valleys Long Term Ecological Research organization. The closest human settlement is Scott Base McMurdo approximately 125 kilometres (78 mi) away. In addition to the unmanned observation station, a 5-day emergency supply of food for 6 people is cached 600 metres (2,000 ft) from the southwestern shore. Research teams establish temporary camps from which research activities are conducted on short term basis in the summer months.

== Composition ==
Lake Vida does not possess many factors attributed to the existence of life formations. Lake Vida contains high levels of nitrous oxide (N_{2}O) and also molecular hydrogen (H_{2}). The chemicals are believed to be released from chemical reactions between the brine and underlying sediments. The molecular hydrogen may be crucial as an energy source for life in the lake and aids in justifying the presence of life in an oxygen-deprived environment.

== Hydrology ==
Lake Vida has at least three named inflows: Victoria River, Kite Stream, and Dune Creek. Victoria River passes through the Vida Basin into Victoria Valley, Victoria Land as ephemeral glacial meltwater from the Upper Victoria Glacier, draining from Victoria Upper Lake, 7 kilometres (4.3 mi) to the northwest, to finally drain into the west end of Lake Vida. Kite Stream is also located in the Vida Basin and flows as ephemeral glacial meltwater west from the Victoria Lower Glacier into the east end of Lake Vida. The United States Geological Survey's Atlas of Antarctic Research maps up to nine Lake Vida inflows or outflows including Victoria River and Kite Stream. The inflows and outflows are normally dry due to average annual temperatures down to −30 °C (−22 °F) at Lake Vida. Meltwater flows for a few weeks in the summer months when temperatures rise sufficiently for the nearby glaciers to melt. The McMurdo Dry Valleys are classified as extreme desert. The area receives less than 10 centimetres (3.9 in) of snow precipitation a year, in the form of snow that builds the nearby glaciers.

== Geology ==
=== Main geological features ===
In the vicinity of Lake Vida, a variety of geological features are noted, the most significant being glaciers, lakes, valleys, ridges, and summits. There are approximately 25 named glaciers within a 25 kilometres (16 mi) radius with the nearest being Upper Victoria Glacier, Packard Glacier, Clark Glacier, and Clio Glacier. In the same radius, there are approximately 14 named ridges with the nearest being Robertsons Ridge, Helios Ridge, and Nottage Ridge. In addition to Victoria Valley, there are 16 named valleys with the nearest being Sanford Valley, Barwick Valley and McKelvey Valley. In addition to Upper Victoria Lake that feeds Lake Vida with meltwater, there are approximately 11 other lakes, the nearest being Lake Thomas. The summits around Lake Vida are as follows, Mautino Peak, Mount Saga, Mount Allen, Mount Theseus, Mount Cerberus, Mount Insel, Nickell Peak, and Sponsors Peak.

=== Other geological features ===
Other more minor features include benches, cliffs, gaps, and streams. The Victoria Valley dunefield, an approximately 1.5 km^{2} belt which is about 3.1 km long, lies to the east of Lake Vida. It is an important site for research into the landforms and processes of perennial niveo-aeolian environments.

== Natural history ==
Kite Stream is named after a researcher, James Kite, who found numerous meteorites in the area (1977–1978).

== History ==
Lake Vida lies north of Mount Cerberus in the Victoria Valley of Victoria Land. Named by the Victoria University of Wellington Antarctic Expedition (1958–59) after Vida (Vaida), a sledge dog of the Nimrod Expedition, 1910-13. Lake Vida was originally thought to be frozen to the lakebed.

== Life ==
Scientists have found life in an Antarctic Lake Vida that was sealed off from the outside world by a thick sheet of ice several thousands of years ago. The discovery of the ecosystem pushes the boundaries of what life can endure, and may inform the search for alien microbes on other planets, such as Mars, or on icy moons, for instance, Jupiter's moon Europa.

== Species lists ==
The following eukaryote species have been catalogued within 1 degree of Lake Vida:

Kingdom Animalia

- Phylum Arthropoda : Alloptes stercorarii (arachnida, mite), Tydeus setsukoae (arachnida, mite)
- Phylum Rotifera : Philodina spp.
- Phylum Tardigrada : Unknown sp.

Kingdom Fungi

- Division Ascomycota : Lepraria sp.

Kingdom Plantae

- Division Bryophyta : Bryum argenteum, Bryum pseudotriquetrum, Bryum subrotundifolium, Ceratodon purpureus, Didymodon gelidus, Grimmia antarctici, Grimmia sp., Pottia heimii, Sarconeurum glaciale,
- Division Marchantiophyta : Cephaloziella exiliflora

Kingdom Protista

- Phylum Ciliophora : Chilodonella sp., Epistylis sp., Euplotes sp., Halteria sp., Homalozoon sp., Nassula sp., Oxytricha sp., Pleuronema sp., Podophrya sp., Pyxidium sp., Saprophilus sp., Spathidium sp., Sphaerophrya sp., Vorticella sp.
- Phylum Sarcomastigophora : Acanthocystis sp., Actinophyrys sp.,
- Phylum Euglenozoa : Bodo sp. (kinetoplastid)

== See also ==
- Astrobiology
- Extremophile
