= Helicopter Mountains =

Mountain range in Victoria Land, Antarctica

- Location within Antarctica

Geography
- Continent: Antarctica
- Region: Victoria Land
- Range coordinates: 77.190839°S 161.430568°E

The Helicopter Mountains (77.190839°S 161.430568°E) are a series of rugged mountains west of Mount Mahony in the Saint Johns Range, Antarctica. They rise to 1,700 metres (5,600 ft) at Mount James and include also from west to east Touchstone Crag, Mick Peak and Hott Peak. The mountains form the northwest end of the Saint Johns Range.

== Name ==
The Helicopter Mountains were so named by the Advisory Committee on Antarctic Names in 2007 in recognition of the wide use of helicopters in supporting the U.S. Antarctic Program at McMurdo Sound and the McMurdo Dry Valleys. Peaks in the mountains have been named after personnel in the helicopter group.

== Features ==
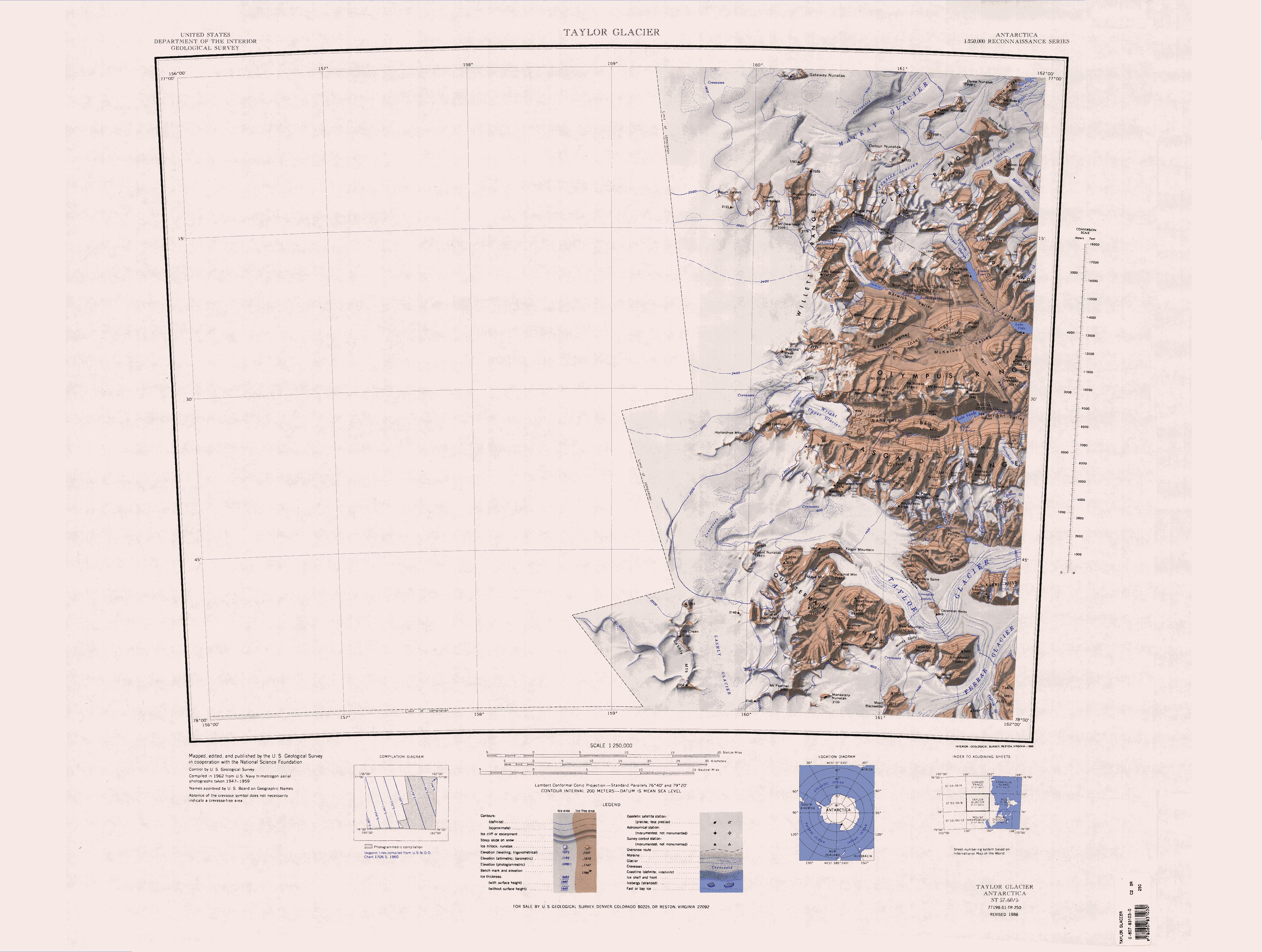
West part of Saint Johns Range in north east

=== Touchstone Crag ===
77.199058°S 161.307138°E. A rugged mountain 1,550 metres (5,090 ft) high, 1.4 nautical miles (2.6 km; 1.6 mi) west of Mick Peak in the west part of Helicopter Mountains. The abrupt south-facing cliffs of the feature also mark the northwest extremity of Saint Johns Range. Named by US-ACAN (2007) after Steven Touchstone, helicopter mechanic in support of the United States Antarctic Program at McMurdo Sound and McMurdo Dry Valleys in nine austral field seasons 1999-2000 to 2007-08.

=== Mick Peak ===
77.191939°S 161.383776°E. A peak about 1,500 metres (4,900 ft) high, 1.5 nautical miles (2.8 km; 1.7 mi) west-northwest of Mount James in Helicopter Mountains. Named by US-ACAN (2007) after Robert Franz Mick, helicopter mechanic in support of the United States Antarctic Program at McMurdo Sound and McMurdo Dry Valleys in eight austral field seasons 2000-01 to 2007-08.

=== Mount James ===
77.200893°S 161.482721°E. The highest mountain in Helicopter Mountains, Saint Johns Range, rising to 1,700 metres (5,600 ft) between Mick Peak and Hott Peak. Named by the Advisory Committee on Antarctic Names (US-ACAN) (2007) after Barry Wendell James, helicopter pilot in support of the United States Antarctic Program at McMurdo Sound and McMurdo Dry Valleys in 10 austral field seasons 1998-99 to 2007-08.

=== Hott Peak ===
77.21102°S 161.502936°E. A steep ridgelike mountain with a sharp peak rising to 1,550 metres (5,090 ft) between Mount James and Mount Mahony in east Helicopter Mountains. Named by US-ACAN (2007) after Ronald Dale Hott, helicopter mechanic in support of the United States Antarctic Program at McMurdo Sound and McMurdo Dry Valleys in 10 austral field seasons 1998-99 to 2007-08.

== Sources ==
- "Helicopter Mountains", Geographic Names Information System, United States Geological Survey, United States Department of the Interior
- "Hott Peak", Geographic Names Information System, United States Geological Survey, United States Department of the Interior
- "Mick Peak", Geographic Names Information System, United States Geological Survey, United States Department of the Interior
- "Mount James", Geographic Names Information System, United States Geological Survey, United States Department of the Interior
- "Touchstone Crag", Geographic Names Information System, United States Geological Survey, United States Department of the Interior

This article incorporates public domain material from websites or documents of the United States Geological Survey.
