= Harker Canyon =

Harker Canyon or Harkers Canyon is a name of several canyons in the United States:

- Harkers Canyon (Salt Lake County, Utah)
- Harkers Canyon (Tooele County, Utah)
- Harker Canyon (Tooele County, Utah)
- Harker Canyon (Washington)
