= Alfred Harker =

English geologist (1859–1939)

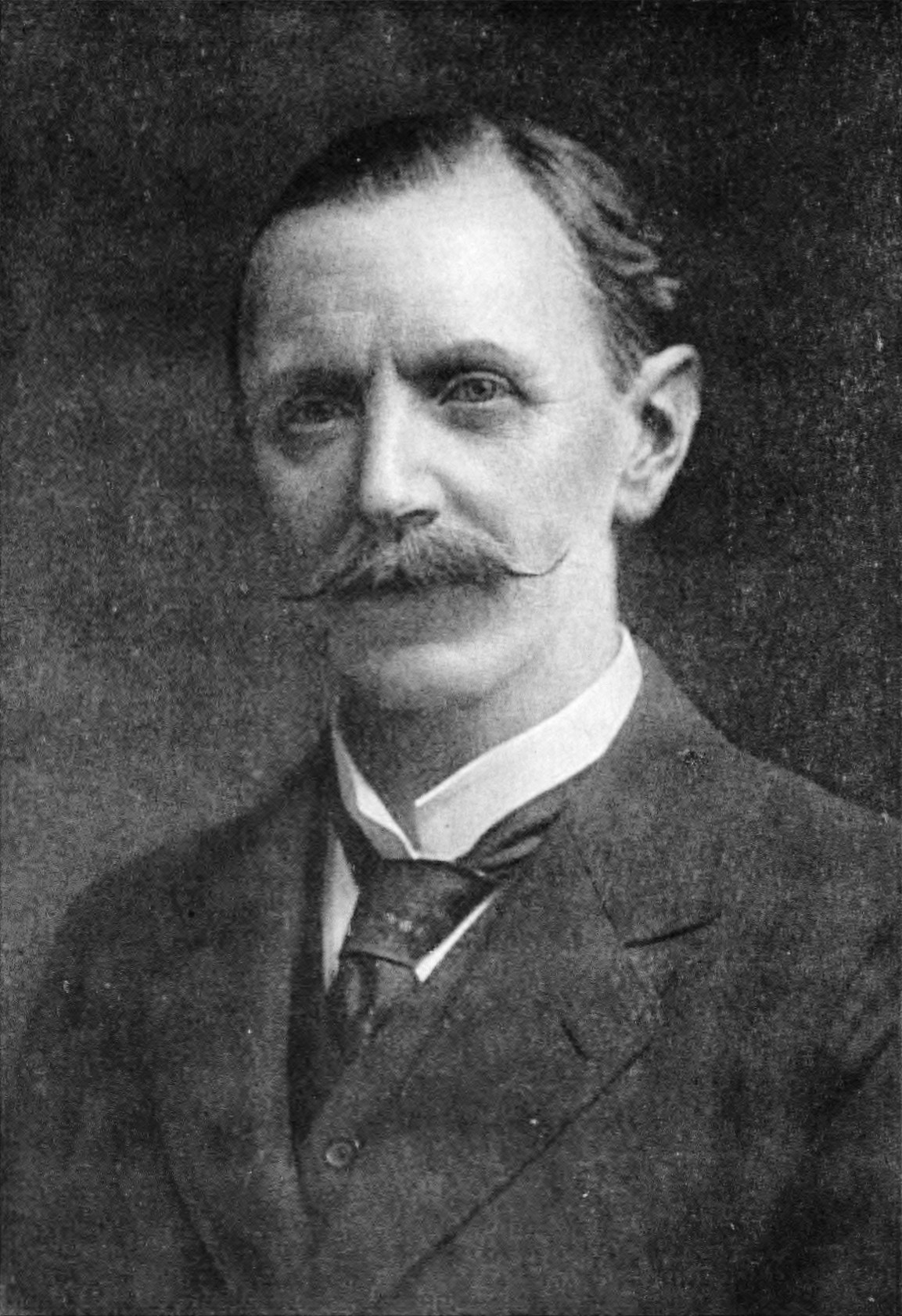
- Born: 18 February 1859; Hull, Yorkshire, England
- Died: 28 July 1939 (aged 80)
- Occupation: Geologist
- Known for: Geological studies of western Scotland and the Isle of Skye
- Notable work: Petrology for Students

Signature
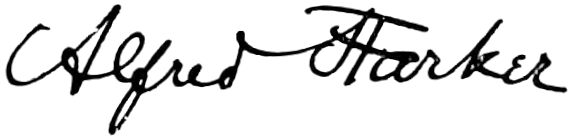

Alfred Harker FRS (19 February 1859 – 28 July 1939) was an English geologist who specialised in petrology and interpretive petrography. He was lecturer in petrology at the University of Cambridge for many years, and carried out field mapping for the Geological Survey of Scotland and geological studies of western Scotland and the Isle of Skye. He and other British geologists pioneered the use of thin sections and the petrographic microscope in interpretive petrology.

== Education and career ==
Harker's father was the Yorkshire corn merchant Portas Hewart Harker, his mother Ellen Mary Harker. He attended Hull and East Riding College, and the private Clewer House School (Windsor) before enrolling as an undergraduate at St. John's College (Cambridge) from where he graduated with an M.A. on 18 January 1882. Whilst at Cambridge he was an early member of the Sedgwick Club. In 1884 he held the post of Demonstrator in the Geology Department under Thomas McKenny Hughes (whom he regarded his mentor), as lecturer at Newnham College in 1892 at St. John's College, as University Lecturer in 1904, and as Reader in Petrology in 1918.

Harker's duties included teaching Mineralogy and Petrology to students. Harker was elected as a Fellow of St. John's College in 1885. A geological tour of Western Europe in 1887 introduced him to the metamorphic rocks of the Ardennes which proved to be an influential experience to his continuing research. Harker accompanied Professor Thomas McKenny Hughes to the United States in 1891 where they attended the 5th International Geological Congress. This was the first time the event had been held outside Europe.

== Fieldwork and research ==
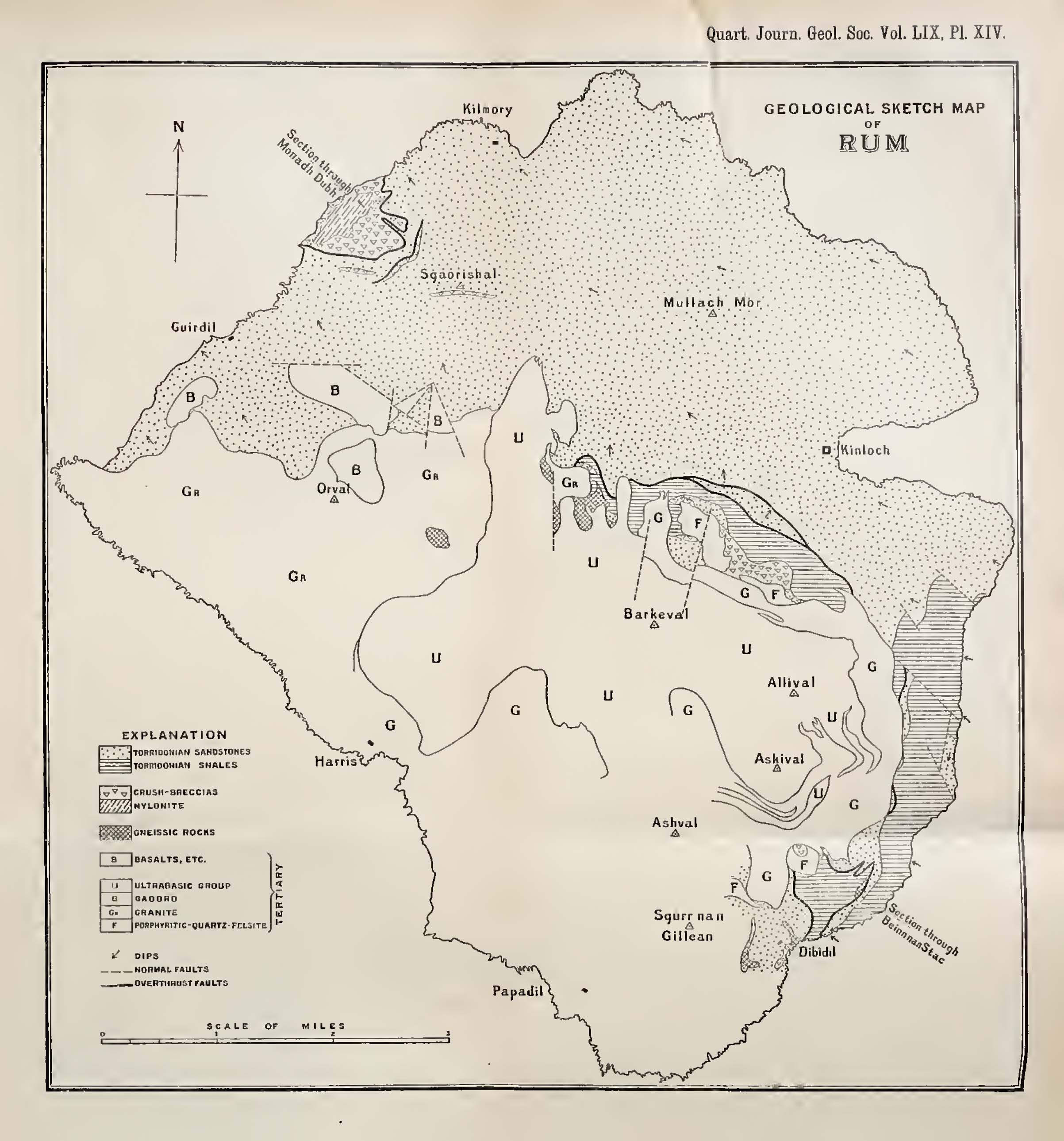
Alfred Harker's Geological Map of the Isle of Rum, 1903

In 1895, Harker commenced employment with the Geological Survey of Great Britain on a part-time basis. Professor McKenny-Hughes had also worked with the Survey, but Harker's invitation came from the then Director General, Archibald Geikie. This was to assist in the mapping and determination of the igneous rocks of the Isle of Skye and the Small Isles. This association lasted until 1905. At this time, he also became a Member of the Scottish Mountaineering Club.

Harker's active fieldwork programme also saw him collaborating with Professor John Edward Marr of the Department of Geology on the volcanic rocks of the Lake District in 1889. The Sedgwick Museum of Earth Sciences opened in 1904 and three years later, Harker published research on material he had prepared petrological rock slices of. He named the petrological samples brought back by Charles Darwin as the 'Beagle Collection of Rocks'. The collection of 42,000 rock specimens made by Harker forms the basis of the Sedgwick Museum's petrological collection, now comprising more than 150,000 hand specimens and thin sections which are known collectively as the Harker Collection.

== Later years ==
Harker retired in 1931 and St. John's College made him a Life Fellow soon after his retirement. He died in 1939. A book illustrating the geology and landscapes of the Western Isles of Scotland was published posthumously. Many of the illustrations in this work were based on drawings he made in his numerous field notebooks.

== Honours and awards ==
He was elected a Fellow of the Royal Society (FRS) in June 1902, and received their Royal Medal in 1935. In 1907 he was awarded the Murchison Medal, and in 1922 the Wollaston medal, both by the Geological Society of London, which he had served as president from 1916 to 1918. The University of Edinburgh awarded him with an honorary doctoral degree in law in 1919. Harker Glacier on South Georgia Island, Mount Harker in Antarctica, and Dorsa Harker, a feature on the Moon, are named after him. The mineral harkerite, first found on the Isle of Skye, is named after him. After his retirement, he was given the post of honorary curator of the Cambridge Petrological Museum, and their extensive rock collection bears his name. Two lecture rooms are named after him in the Department of Earth Sciences, University of Cambridge.

== Archives ==
13 boxes of the papers of Alfred Harker are held at the Sedgwick Museum of Earth Sciences in Cambridge. The archive comprises notebooks, sketchbooks, and photograph albums detailing geological excursions in the U.K from the late nineteenth century. These mostly cover the Isle of Skye, Isle of Arran, Yorkshire (Scarborough), and other Scottish Highlands. There are also notebooks detailing specimens collected (catalogues), lecture note drafts, maps, and some personal records including details of an 80th birthday event. A collection level description is available on the Archives Hub

== Works ==
A list of Harker's principal geological writings up to 1917 can be found in a biographical article published in the Geological Magazine.

- The Bala volcanic series of Caernarvonshire and associated rocks; being the Sedgwick Prize Essay for 1888, 1889, Cambridge University Press.
- Petrology for Students, 1895, Cambridge University Press
- The geology of North Arran, South Bute, and the Cumbraes, with parts of Ayrshire and Kintyre (Sheet 21, Scotland.), 1903, HMSO
- The overthrust torridonian rocks of the Isle of Rum, 1903, The Quarterly Journal of the Geological Society of London Volume 59 pp. 189–215
- The Tertiary Igneous Rocks of Skye, 1904, Geological Survey of Scotland Memoir
- The Natural History of Igneous Rocks, 1909, Macmillan
- The Geology of the Small Isles of Inverness-shire: (Rum, Canna, Eigg, Muck etc.)(sheet 60, Scotland.), 1909, Geological Survey of Scotland Memoir
- Notes on geological map-reading, 1920, Heffer
- Metamorphism: A Study of the Transformations of Rock-Masses, 1923, Methuen, Second Edition 1939

== Bibliography ==
- Young, Davis A., (2003) Mind Over Magma: The Story of Igneous Petrology, Princeton University Press. ISBN 0-691-10279-1
- Bragg, William (1939) Address of the President Sir William Bragg, O.M., at the Anniversary Meeting, 30 November 1939, Proceedings of the Royal Society of London, Series A, Mathematical and Physical Sciences 173(954):286–312 (18 December 1939). Obituary pp. 294–295.
