= History of slavery in Delaware =

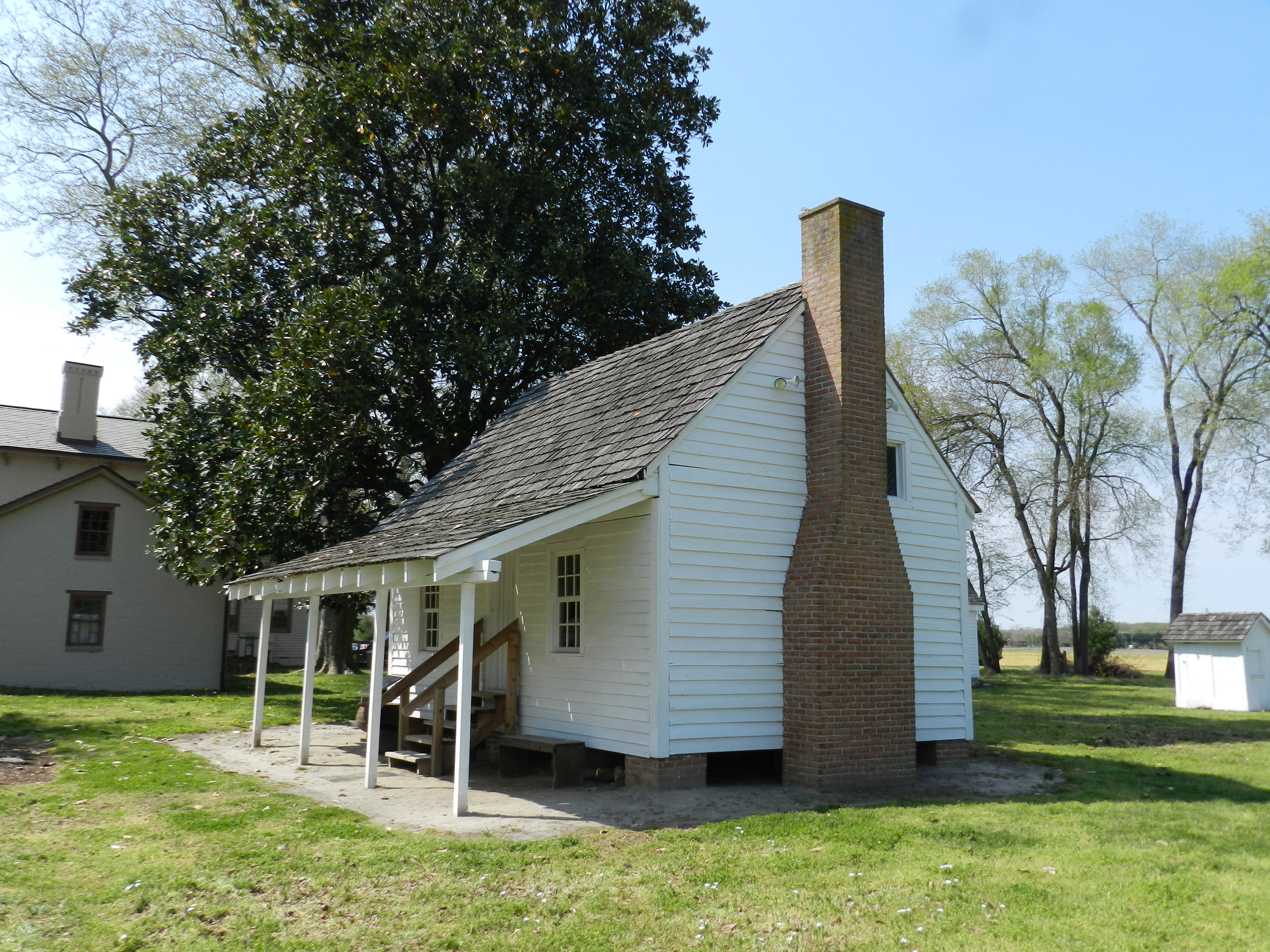
Slave quarters at Gov. Ross Plantation, in Seaford, Delaware

The history of slavery in Delaware began when it was Delaware Colony and continued until the ratification of the Thirteenth Amendment in December 1865. The Delaware River was an important waterway used for bringing slaves inland to Pennsylvania. In 1776, Delaware prohibited the importation of slaves, and on December 7, 1787, prohibited both imports and exports of slaves from the state. Delaware never abolished slavery and in the order of admission to the Union, it was the first of the 15 slave states. However, it did not secede from the Union during the American Civil War. There were 1,798 enslaved people living in Delaware at the time of the 1860 U.S. census.

A state with a mix of enslaved people and a large population of free people of color that lay in close proximity to the slave jails of traders in Baltimore, Maryland and Washington, D.C., legally free blacks were sometimes kidnapped into slavery, and "freedmen found it wise to deposit apprentice and freedom papers with the Pennsylvania Abolition Society in Philadelphia." For example, the Johnson–Cannon gang, whose tavern and slave pen stood on the border between Maryland and Delaware, were notorious slave stealers and murderers in the early 19th century. The state also hosted stations of the Underground Railroad to assist with escapes from slavery such as the Appoquinimink Friends Meetings House. Thomas Garrett of Wilmington, Delaware, a businessman of the Quaker faith, reportedly assisted in the escapes of between 2,000 and 3,000 slaves.

== See also ==
- Delaware § Slavery and race
- Delaware in the American Civil War
- History of slavery in the United States by state
- List of Delaware slave traders
