= Clewer House School =

Former school in Windsor, Berkshire, England

Information
- Established: 1839
- Founder: Rev. William Redford Harris
- Closed: Late 19th Century

Clewer House School was a 19th-century grammar school in Clewer, Windsor, Berkshire for boys.

Clewer House was a manor house built c. 1795. In the early 1800s, the house was occupied by John Ramsbottom (1778–1845), who served as one of the two members of parliament for Windsor from 1810 to 1845 and moved to Old Windsor c. 1835.

The school was founded in 1839 by the Rev. William Redford Harris, a magistrate in Windsor who became the town's mayor in 1864.

The course of study includes instruction in Classics, Mathematics, French, German, English, Singing, Gymnastics, etc. to about 130 boarders. Pupils are prepared for the Oxford and Cambridge Local Examinations, at which 248 certificates, 92 in honours, had been gained by pupils up to 1873.

The school had an excellent academic reputation for a number of decades but was closed at about the end of the 19th century.

== Notable alumni ==
- Alfred Harker (1859–1939), geologist
- Edward Albert Sharpey-Schafer (1850–1935), physiologist
- Abe Bailey (1864-1940), South African politician and financier
