= Harker Creek =

Harker Creek may refer to:

- Harker Creek (Utah)
- Harker Creek (Wisconsin)
