= Harkes =

Harkes is a surname. Notable people with the surname include:

- Erin Harkes (born 1977), American singer-songwriter
- Gerbrand Harkes (fl. 1538–1593), Dutch bookseller
- John Harkes (born 1967), American soccer player and coach

== See also ==
- Harker (surname)
- Harkes, Missouri
