= East Riding College =

Further education college located in the East Riding of Yorkshire, England, UK

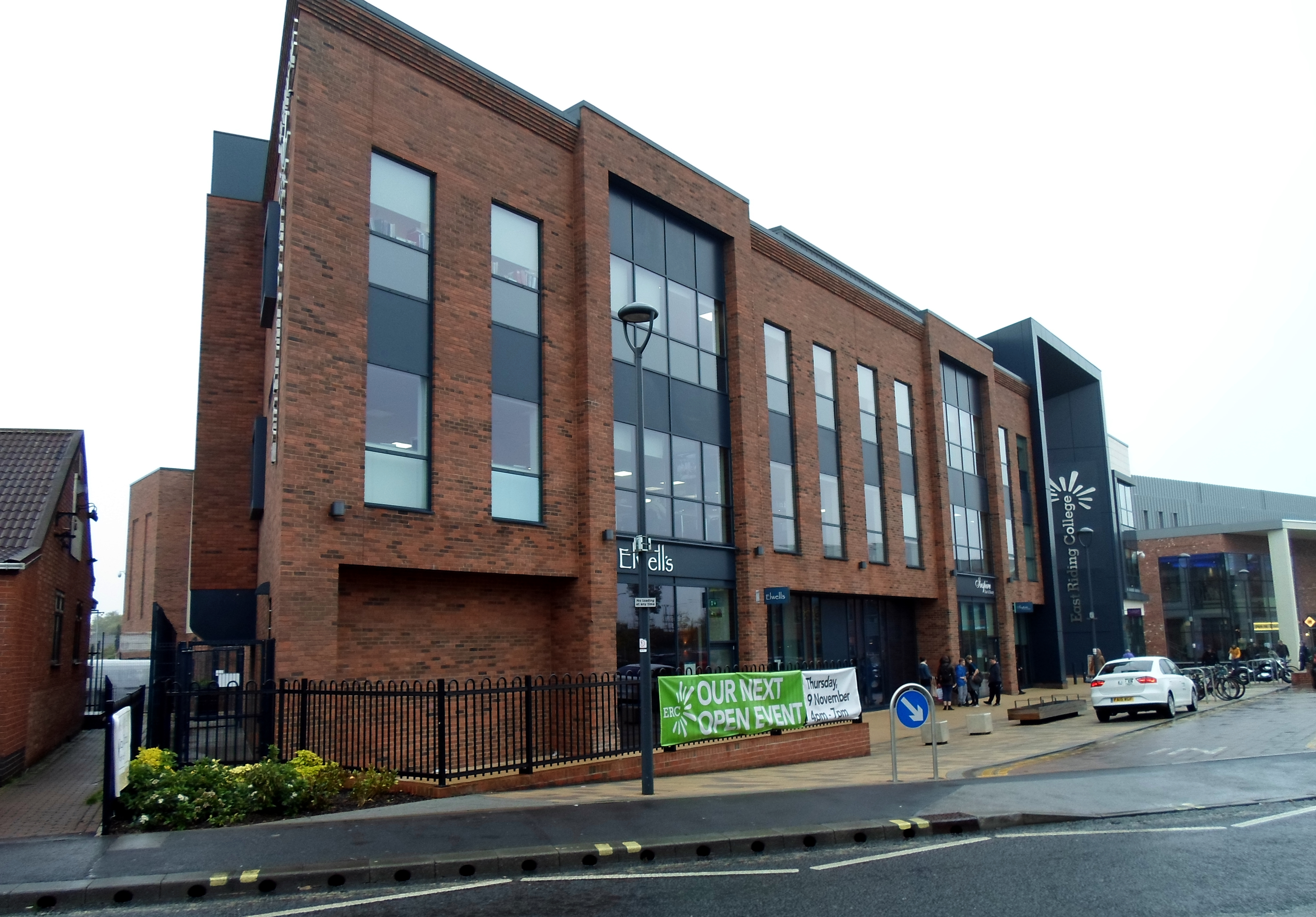
East Riding College, Armstrong Way, Beverley. Building opened in September 2015. Taken 19 October 2017.

East Riding College is a further education college located in the East Riding of Yorkshire, England. In August 2020 the college amalgamated with the TEC Partnership.

== History ==
East Riding College was formed following the merger of two colleges in March 2002, Beverley College and East Yorkshire College. East Yorkshire College started as the Bridlington Technical Institute in the early 1950s, and by July 1971 was based in West Street, Bridlington. In 1978, the college was renamed the Bridlington College of Further Education, which at the time had a total of 80 members of staff. East Yorkshire College was established in 1981, when the Bridlington College merged with the Driffield College of Further Education. In 1983, the college acquired a factory site in Bessingby and increased its range of vocational courses. By 1985, the St. Mary's Walk had become the main college site and by 1989, 5,000 people had enrolled with 900 of those attending on a full-time basis. By 1990, 6,000 enrolled with 1,000 of those attending on a full-time basis.

The college was a major provider of adult education in the East Riding of Yorkshire, providing courses in association with the Humberside County Council adult education service. The college left local authority control in April 1993. By October 1996, the college was the second largest employer in Bridlington, with 289 members of staff including 68 full-time teaching and 86 full-time support staff. During the 1995/96 academic year, there were 900 full-time students and more than 2,000 studying short courses. At the time, the college had sites at St. Mary's Walk and West Street in Bridlington, Bessingby Way in Bessingby, Lancaster Road in Carnaby and Manorfield Road in Driffield, but two sites had been relinquished by the time of the 1998–99 Inspectorate Report, produced by the Further Education Funding Council in January 1999. With the implementation of a new principal in August 1996, it was found that the college was suffering severe financial difficulties. Consequently, a major restructuring took place that reduced the number of employed senior managers and teaching staff. Whilst these reductions improved the college's financial position somewhat, it remained in a poor state.

The proposals to merge Beverley College and East Yorkshire College carried strong support from the East Riding of Yorkshire Council and Bishop Burton College. A period of public consultation followed before the final recommendation was put forward to the Secretary of State for Education, to allow the merger to take place on 1 August 2001. At the time, the colleges had a combined enrolment of around 10,000 students and by March 2002, the merger had been completed. The new college, now known as East Riding College, stated that its intention was to be "at the heart of the community" through its main sites in Beverley and Bridlington, as well as its smaller ones which at the time were based in Carnaby, Driffield, Hornsea, Full Sutton and Wakefield. Following the merger, 35 jobs were axed in May 2004 as an attempt to further reduce costs. The 30 voluntary and five compulsory redundancies mainly affected administrative and support staff, but some teaching roles were also affected. The Bridlington site lost 17 jobs, whilst the rest was split between Beverley, Hornsea and Hull.

== Sites ==
The college presently has two main sites in Beverley and Bridlington. There is also a smaller campus in Kingston upon Hull.

- Armstrong Way, Beverley (53.8406°N 0.4217°W)
- St Mary's Walk, Bridlington (54.0924°N 0.1979°W)
- St James Street, Hull (53.7373°N 0.3503°W)

Initially, proposals to relocate from the St Mary's Walk site to a new campus at the former Hilderthorpe Road coach park in the centre of Bridlington were considered, but abandoned in February 2004 after investigating the planning issues and costs involved. Redevelopment of the St Mary's Walk site subsequently began in January 2008 following planning permission being awarded by the East Riding of Yorkshire Council in August 2007. The older buildings were demolished and replaced with a new 65,000 square foot, two-storey building featuring 44 teaching rooms. The works cost £17 million and the new building was unveiled to students in September 2009. The Learning and Skills Council (LSC) had agreed to fund the scheme after planning permission was awarded.

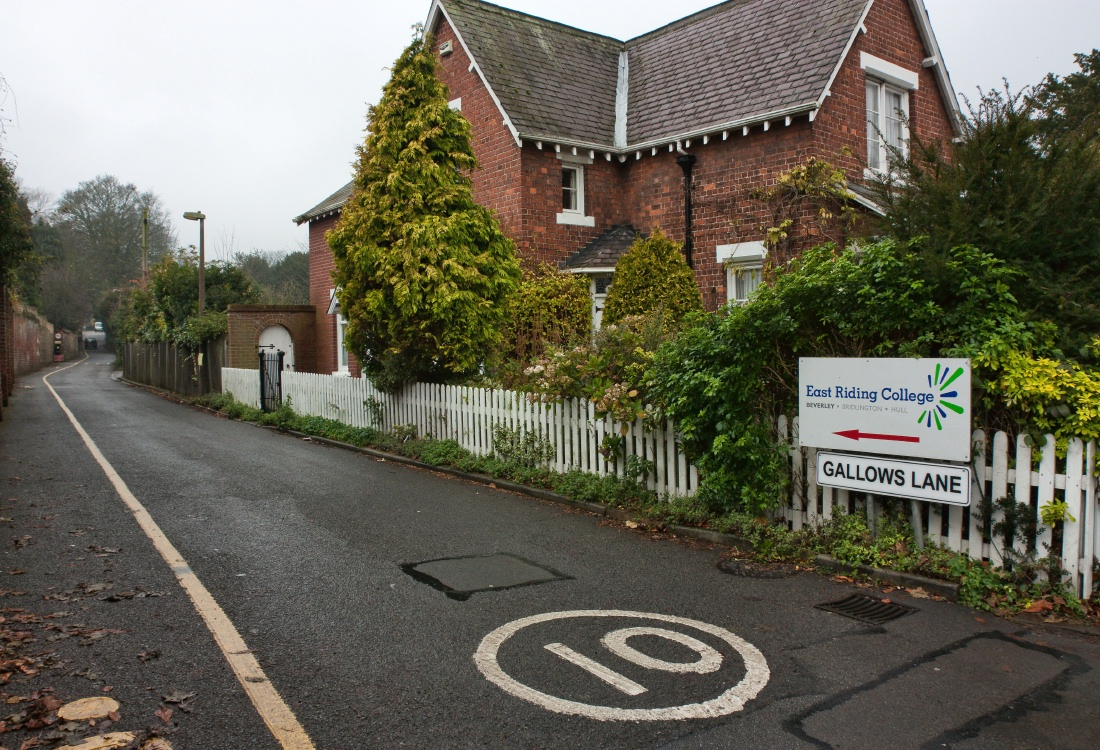
The former East Riding College site at Gallows Lane in Beverley, November 2010.

The Beverley campus, previously located at Gallows Lane in the town, moved to a new £14 million site as part of a retail development known as the Flemingate Shopping Centre, in September 2015. It was initially projected to move in the summer of 2010, but planning issues surrounding the development as a whole resulted in the project being delayed. The former Gallows Lane site was subsequently redeveloped into 36 homes, with the money from the sale of these being used to finance the new development. The new building, which was designed in 2013, features 30 teaching rooms. Both sites were designed by Jefferson Sheard Architects, with the redevelopment of both costing £40 million in total.

The Hull site serves as the home to the Humber region's Trade Union Studies centre, which provides a range of courses accredited by the Trades Union Congress (TUC). In March 2003, eight students completing an International Studies Course travelled to New York for a six-day exchange trip to discover how working practices had changed following the events of 11 September 2001. UNISON representatives hoped to spend shifts with fire and ambulance personnel.

=== Services to the public ===
The college previously had four services which were also open to the general public. Only the restaurants and salons remain open to the public:

==== Archers and Elwell's restaurants ====
The Elwell's restaurant at the Beverley site features a fully licensed dining room, served from a professional kitchen. The Bridlington site also has a fully licensed restaurant, known as Archers, which has a 40-seat dining room. Both restaurants are run by learners.

==== Inspire Hair and Beauty ====
Students work in a supervised environment to learn the necessary skills to become a hair stylist or beauty therapist. The service is offered at both the Beverley and Bridlington sites.

==== New Horizons Travel Agency ====
The New Horizons Travel Agency at the Beverley site provided a range of holidays, short breaks and events, such as concerts. This has now closed permanently.

==== Energize Fitness Suite ====
Located at the Bridlington site, the gym hosts a range of rowing machines, bikes and weights.

== Courses ==
The college range of courses include A-Levels, BTECs, apprenticeships and Access courses. It also offers a provision of higher education level courses in conjunction with the University of Hull and the University of Huddersfield. In June 2011, the college launched a condensed construction course in order to fast track people to the standard expected on building sites. In September 2014, the Skills Funding Agency awarded a £220,000 grant to the college to purchase new engineering equipment, including new lathes, milling machines and a machining centre. In 2013, it was reported that there were 1,600 full-time students at the college and a further 8,000 studying part-time. 90 per cent of students were on further education courses, with there being around 500 members of staff.

A February 2016 Ofsted inspection report rated the college's overall effectiveness as 'good'. In June 2017, the college was awarded a bronze rating by the Teaching Excellence Framework (TEF) according to their standard of undergraduate teaching. In 2017, every student at East Riding College passed their A-Levels, resulting in a 100 per cent pass rate for two years in a row.

== Notable alumni ==
- Ernest William Brown, mathematician and astronomer
- Alfred Harker, petrologist
