= F. Flaxington Harker =

Frederick Flaxington Harker (1876–1936) was an American organist and composer of sacred music.

== Biography ==
He was born in Scotland. He became the assistant organist to T. Tertius Noble at York Minster. He emigrated to the United States at 25, and served as Organist and Choirmaster of All Souls Episcopal Church in Asheville, North Carolina. He moved to New York City in 1904 but returned to All Souls in 1907. Beginning in 1914, Harker served as Organist and Choirmaster at St. Paul's Episcopal Church in Richmond, Virginia.

== Music ==
Harker composed cantatas, anthems, choruses, songs both sacred and secular, and some works for organ. Harker was active as a music editor for G. Schirmer Inc. He edited many choral works, organ pieces, and John Stainer's classic text for organ students, The Organ.

== Selected musical compositions ==
Sacred songs for voice and piano or organ

- As it began to dawn (Easter)
- Awake up, my glory (Easter)
- Consider, and hear me
- God shall wipe away all tears
- How beautiful upon the mountains
- Like as the hart desireth the water-brooks
- O Love that wilt not let me go
- O Perfect Love (Wedding song)
- They that sow in tears shall reap in joy
- Turn ye even to me with all your heart
