= Harkers Canyon (Tooele County, Utah) =

Canyon in Utah

Coordinates: 40°29′41″N 112°12′48″W

Harkers Canyon is located 8.5 km (5.3 mi) southeast of the town of Tooele, in Tooele County, Utah, USA. Located high in the Oquirrh Mountains, the canyon is oriented north-south, and drains into Middle Canyon at its northern end. Harkers Canyon is about 2.2 km (1.4 mi) long. The top of the canyon at its southern end is at approximately 2900 m (9500 ft) elevation. The mouth of Harkers Canyon is at 1975 m (6480 ft) elevation. Harkers Canyon is in the Rush Valley watershed.
