= Howard Harker =

British World War I flying ace

Howard Redmayne Harker
- Major Harker c.1918
- Born: 12 May 1891; Prestwich, Lancashire, England
- Died: 27 February 1919 (aged 27); Tidworth Barracks Hospital, Hampshire, England
- Burial place: Southern Cemetery, Manchester, Lancashire; 53°25′45″N 2°15′32″W
- Military career
- Allegiance: United Kingdom
- Branch: British Army; Royal Air Force
- Service years: 1916–1919
- Rank: Major
- Units: No. 5 Reserve Squadron; No. 57 Squadron RFC; No. 2 School of Navigation and Bomb Dropping
- Conflicts: World War I; Western Front
- Awards: Military Cross

Major Howard Redmayne Harker MC (12 May 1891 – 27 February 1919) was a British World War I flying ace credited with five aerial victories.

== Early life and education ==
Howard Harker was born in Prestwich, Lancashire, the son of the architect John Dent Harker (1860–1933). He attended the Lawrence House School in St. Annes-on-Sea, and the Rossall School in Fleetwood, before graduating from Manchester University.

== Flying career ==
From 1913, Harker was employed at the Royal Aircraft Factory at Farnborough, Hampshire. In February 1915 he made a memorable arrival at Hendon Aerodrome in a new B.E.2c biplane flown by Frank Goodden, who treated the assembled crowd to an impromptu display of aerial acrobatics before landing.

Harker was commissioned in the Royal Flying Corps as a temporary second lieutenant (on probation) on 15 April 1916. He was posted to No. 5 Reserve Squadron from 2 May until the day after receiving the Royal Aero Club Aviator's Certificate No. 2945, following his flight in a Maurice Farman biplane at the Military Flying School at Birmingham on 18 May. He was appointed a flying officer on 22 June, and confirmed in his rank on 11 July.

Harker was posted No. 57 Squadron, primarily a bomber and reconnaissance unit, in France. He gained his first victory, while flying a F.E.2d on 24 March 1917, by driving down 'out of control' an Albatros D.II east of Lens. He was appointed a flight commander with the rank of acting-captain on 6 April. In May his squadron was re-equipped with the DH.4, in which on 18 June he destroyed an Albatros D.III south of Houthulst. He was promoted to the rank of lieutenant on 1 July 1917. His remaining three victories were against Albatros D.Vs; on 17 July over Roulers, on 28 July over Ingelmunster, and on 21 August over Ledeghem–Menin.

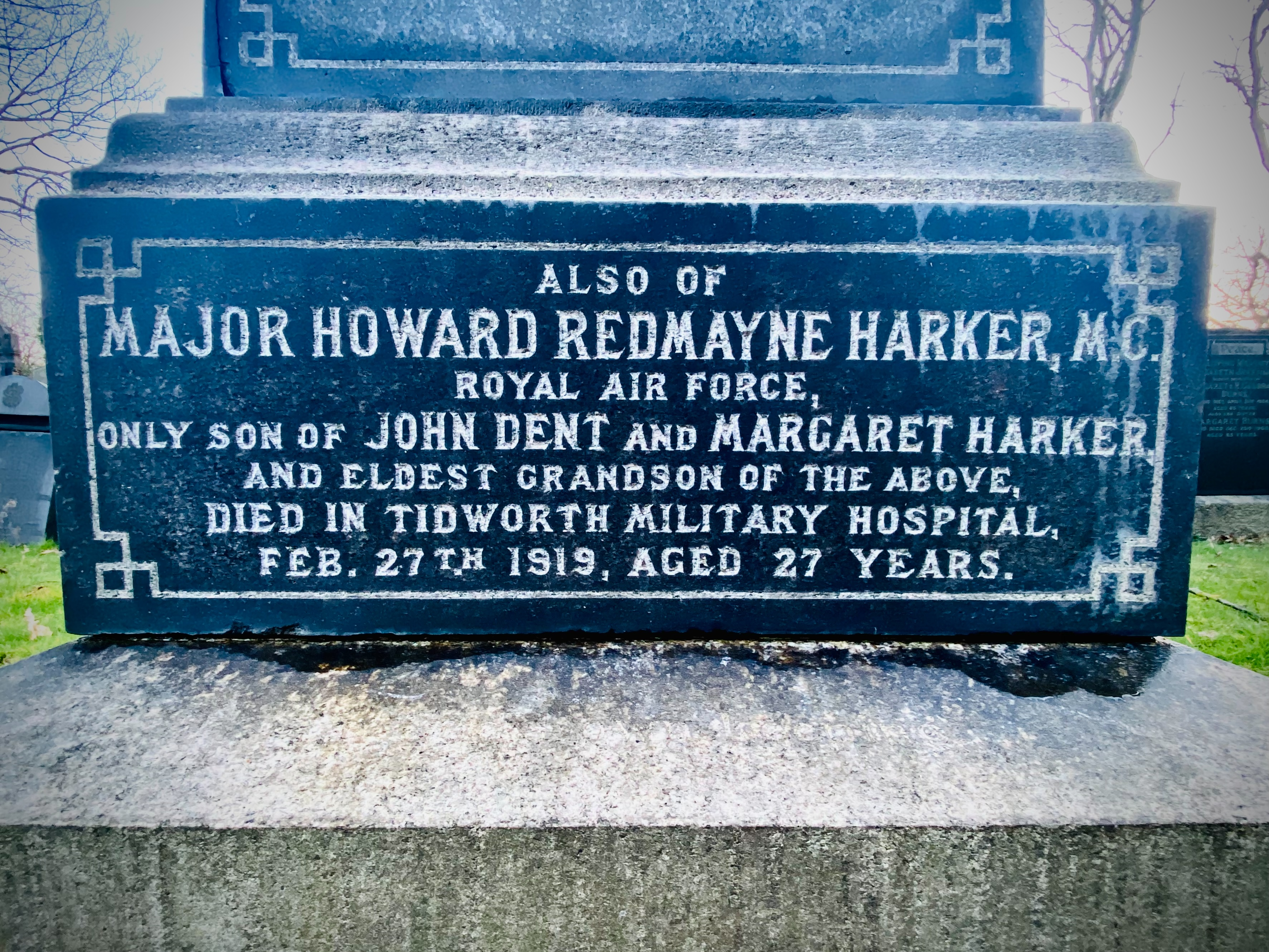
The grave of Major Harker in Southern Cemetery, Manchester

On 26 September 1917 he was awarded the Military Cross, which was gazetted on 8 January 1918. His citation read:

Second Lieutenant (Temporary Captain) Howard Redmayne Harker, Royal Flying Corps (Special Reserve)

"For conspicuous gallantry and devotion to duty. For nearly, a year he has carried out extremely valuable work in taking aeroplane photographs and leading bombing raids far behind the enemy lines, often in the face of great opposition and trying weather conditions. On a recent occasion while returning from a successful bombing raid his formation was attacked by more than twice its number, but by his fine offensive spirit and skilful leadership, the enemy were dispersed. He has consistently set a splendid example to his brother officers."

Harker was appointed an acting-major on 1 October 1918. His final posting was to the No. 2 School of Navigation and Bomb Dropping at RAF Andover, Wiltshire.

== Death ==
Harker died from pneumonia on 27 February 1919 at the Officers' Military Hospital at Tidworth, and is buried in the Southern Cemetery, Manchester.
