= Harker Creek (Wisconsin) =

Coordinates: 43°02′06″N 90°14′18″W

- Location within Wisconsin Location within the United States

Location
- Country: United States
- State: Wisconsin

Physical characteristics
- Source
  - location: Iowa County, Wisconsin
  - elevation: 390 m (1,280 ft)
- Mouth
  - location: Flint Creek, Wisconsin
- Length: 7.5 km (4.7 mi)
- Discharge
  - average: 2.5 cu ft/s (0.071 m^{3}/s)

Harker Creek is a stream located in Iowa County, Wisconsin. The upper end of the creek is approximately 10 km (6.2 mi) west-northwest of the county seat, Dodgeville. The creek flows roughly north-south, and is approximately 7.5 km (4.7 mi) in total length. It drains into Flint Creek at its northern end at 248 m (814 ft) above sea level. The lower portion of the creek is paralleled by Mount Hope Road and Berg Road. Lee Creek drains into Harker Creek at 255 m (838 ft) elevation. The upper portion of Harker Creek is surrounded by steep hills that extend as high as 30 m (100 ft) above the creek. At its highest point, the creek is at approximately 390 m (1280 ft) elevation. The southernmost reentrants of the creek are within 400 m (1300 ft) of U.S. Route 18.
