= William Harker (slave trader) =

19th-century American slave trader

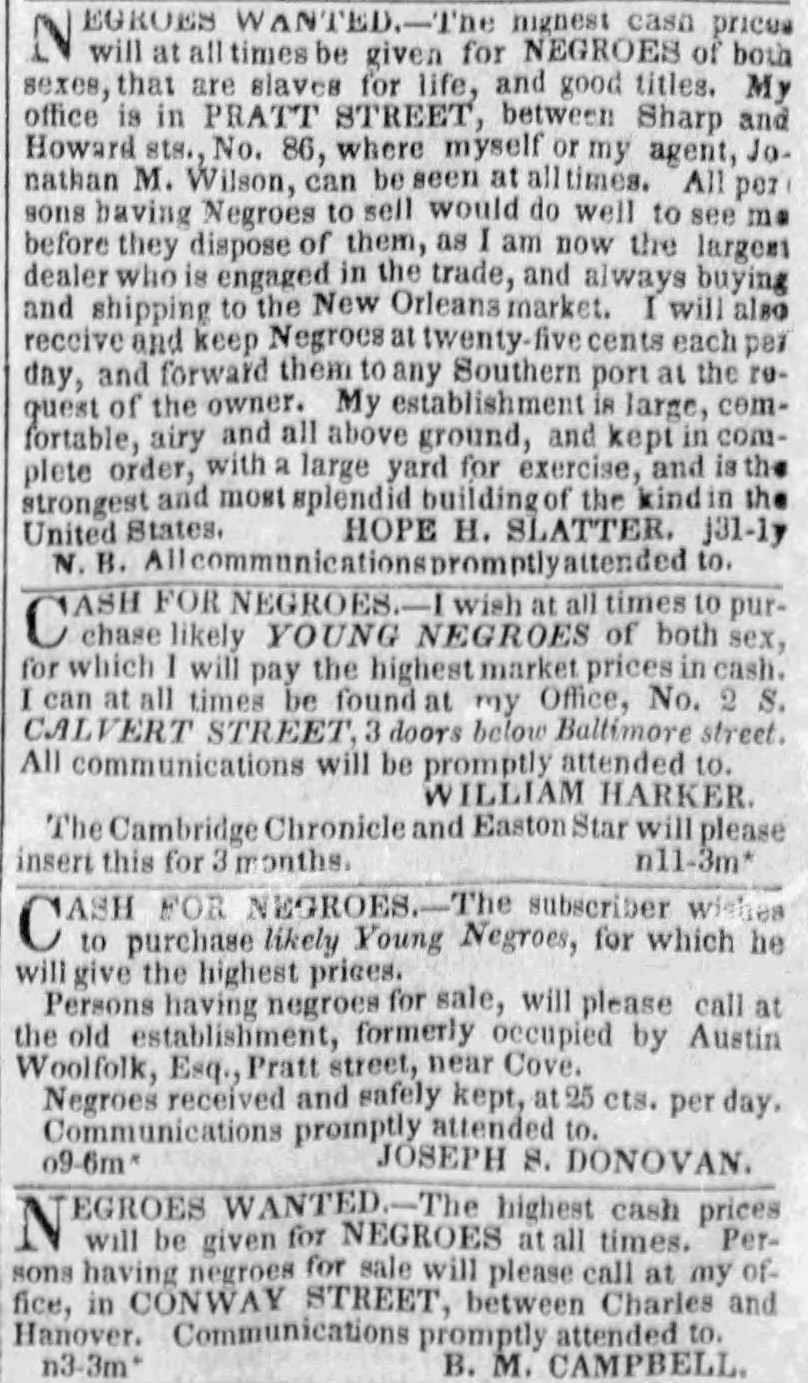
- "NEGROES WANTED" and "CASH FOR NEGROES" ads placed by Hope H. Slatter, Joseph S. Donovan, B. M. Campbell, and William Harker (The Baltimore Sun, Nov. 14, 1843)
- Occupation: Slave trader
- Years active: 1835–1859
- Known for: Longevity in the slave trade

William Harker was a 19th-century American slave trader, known for his extensive career spanning over two decades. Operating primarily in Maryland, Harker played a significant role in the domestic slave trade, actively engaging in the buying and selling of enslaved African Americans from 1835 to 1859. His longevity in the trade was notable during a time when many slave traders came and went.

== Career ==
Harker's operations were deeply embedded in the economic landscape of the Southern United States, reflecting the demand for enslaved labor and the profitability of the trade. As historian Frederic Bancroft noted in Slave Trading in the Old South (1931):

William Harker was a remarkable exception, for he was 'in the market' for a quarter of a century—1835–59, and he bought 'all likely negroes from 8 to 40 years of age'.

Harker maintained an office on South Calvert Street near the intersection with Baltimore Street in Baltimore, a strategic location that likely facilitated his trade activities.

== Advertisement and public perception ==
Harker's notoriety extended beyond the trade itself. An 1852 newspaper advertisement he placed caught the attention of Harriet Beecher Stowe, who referenced it in her non-fiction work, A Key to Uncle Tom's Cabin. Stowe highlighted Harker's business practices, particularly his focus on the profitability of the Southern market:

NEGROES WANTED. I wish to inform the slave holders of Dorchester and the adjacent counties that I am again in the Market. Persons having negroes that are slaves for life to dispose of will find it to their interest to see me before they sell, as I am determined to pay the highest prices in cash that the Southern market will justify. I can be found at A. Hall's Hotel in Easton, where I will remain until the first day of July next. Communications addressed to me at Easton, or information given to Wm. Bell in Cambridge, will meet with prompt attention.

WM. HARKER.

Mr. Harker is very accommodating. He keeps himself informed as to the state of the Southern market, and will give the very highest price that it will justify. Moreover, he will be on hand till July, and will answer any letters from the adjoining country on the subject. On one point he ought to be spoken to. He has not advertised that he does not separate families. It is a mere matter of taste, to be sure; but then, some well-disposed people like to see it on a trader's card, thinking it has a more creditable appearance; and, probably, Mr. Harker, if he reflects a little, will put it in next time. It takes up very little room, and makes a good appearance.

== See also ==
- List of American slave traders
- History of slavery in Maryland
- Slave markets and slave jails in the United States
- Bibliography of the slave trade in the United States
