= Victoria Valley =

Valley in Antarctica

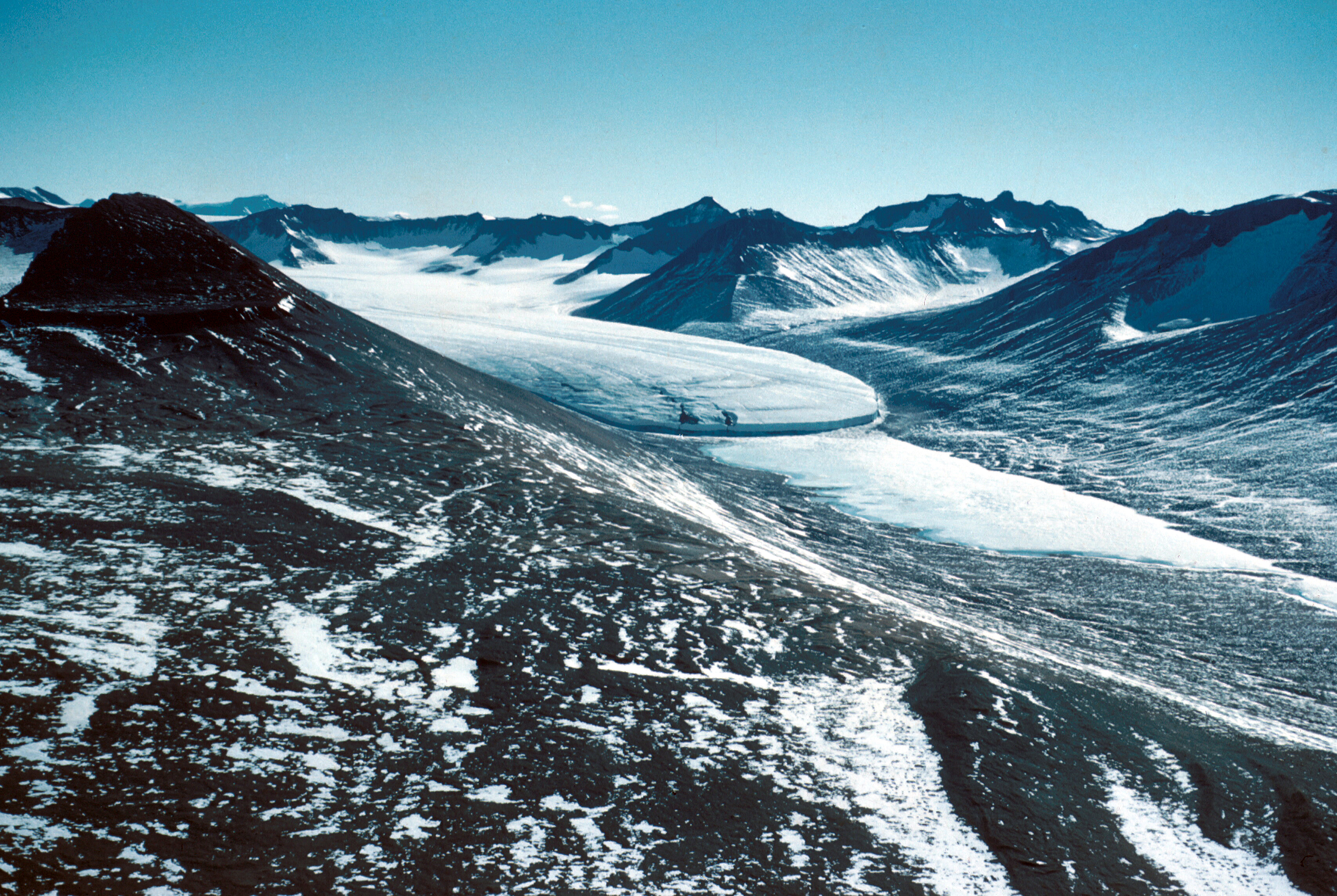
- Victoria Upper Glacier in Victoria Valley 1958

- Location within Antarctica

Geography
- Location: Antarctica
- Coordinates: 77°23′S 161°56′E
- Interactive map of Victoria Valley

Victoria Valley (77°23′S 161°56′E) is an extensive ice-free valley, formerly occupied by a large glacier, extending from Victoria Upper Glacier to Victoria Lower Glacier in Victoria Land, Antarctica. It is one of the larger McMurdo Dry Valleys.

== Name ==
Victoria Valley was named by the Victoria University of Wellington Antarctic Expedition (VUWAE: 1958-59) after their alma mater Victoria University of Wellington, which sponsored the expedition.

== Location ==
The Victoria Valley is one of the McMurdo Dry Valleys. The head of the Victoria Valley, which contains the Victoria Upper Glacier, is south of the Clare Range. The valley descends south-southeast between Saint Johns Range to the east and the Cruzen Range to the west. It is joined from the west by the Barwick Valley, and then south of Mount Insel by the McKelvey Valley, below which Lake Vida lies across the valley. The valley continues in an east-northeast direction. The Packard Glacier descends part way into it from the north and the Clark Glacier extends part way into it from the south. At the foot of the valley Victoria Lower Glacier flows into the Wilson Piedmont Glacier, which extends along the west coast of the Ross Sea.

== Features ==
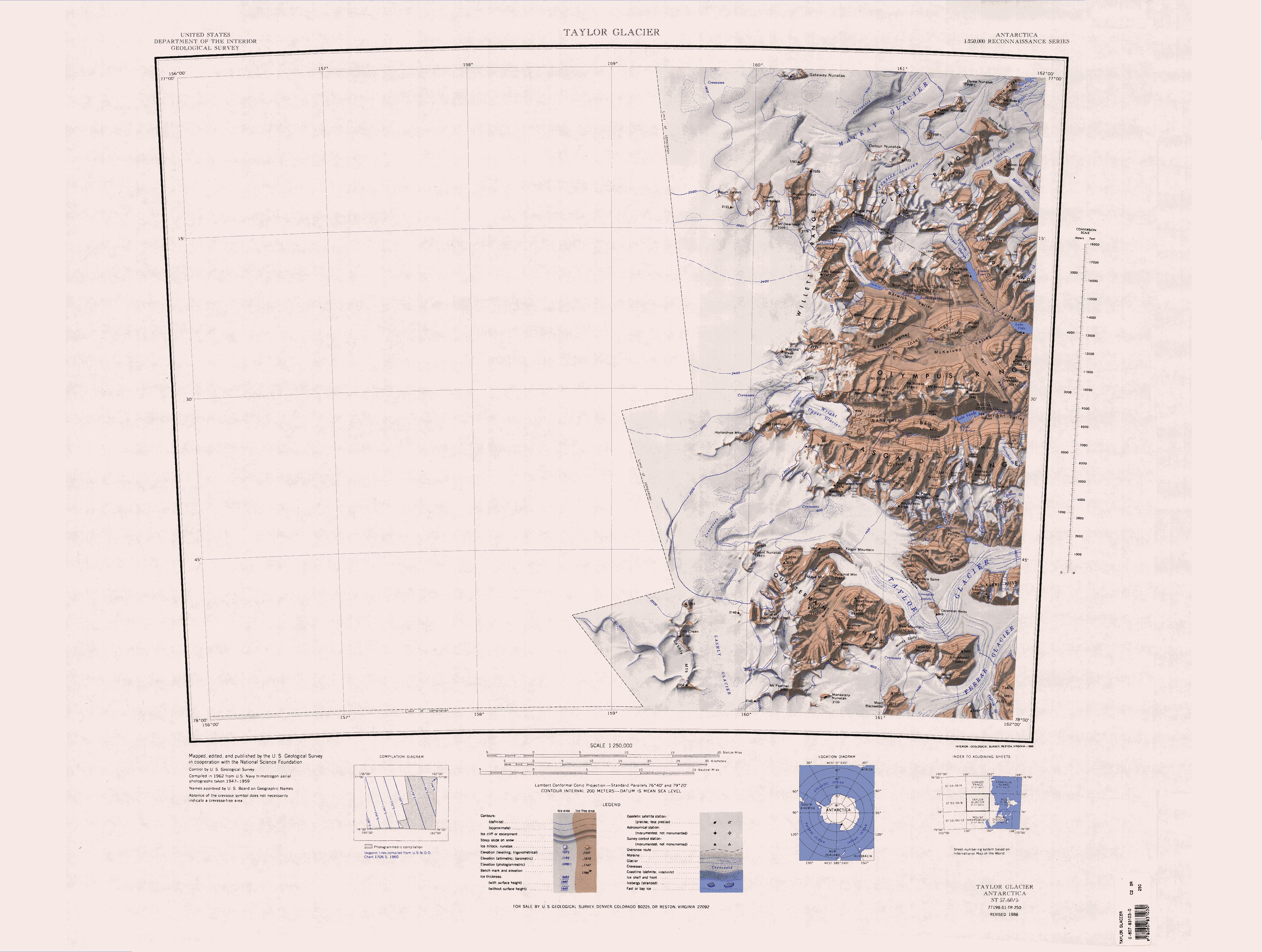
Upper Victoria Valley towards the north of mapped region

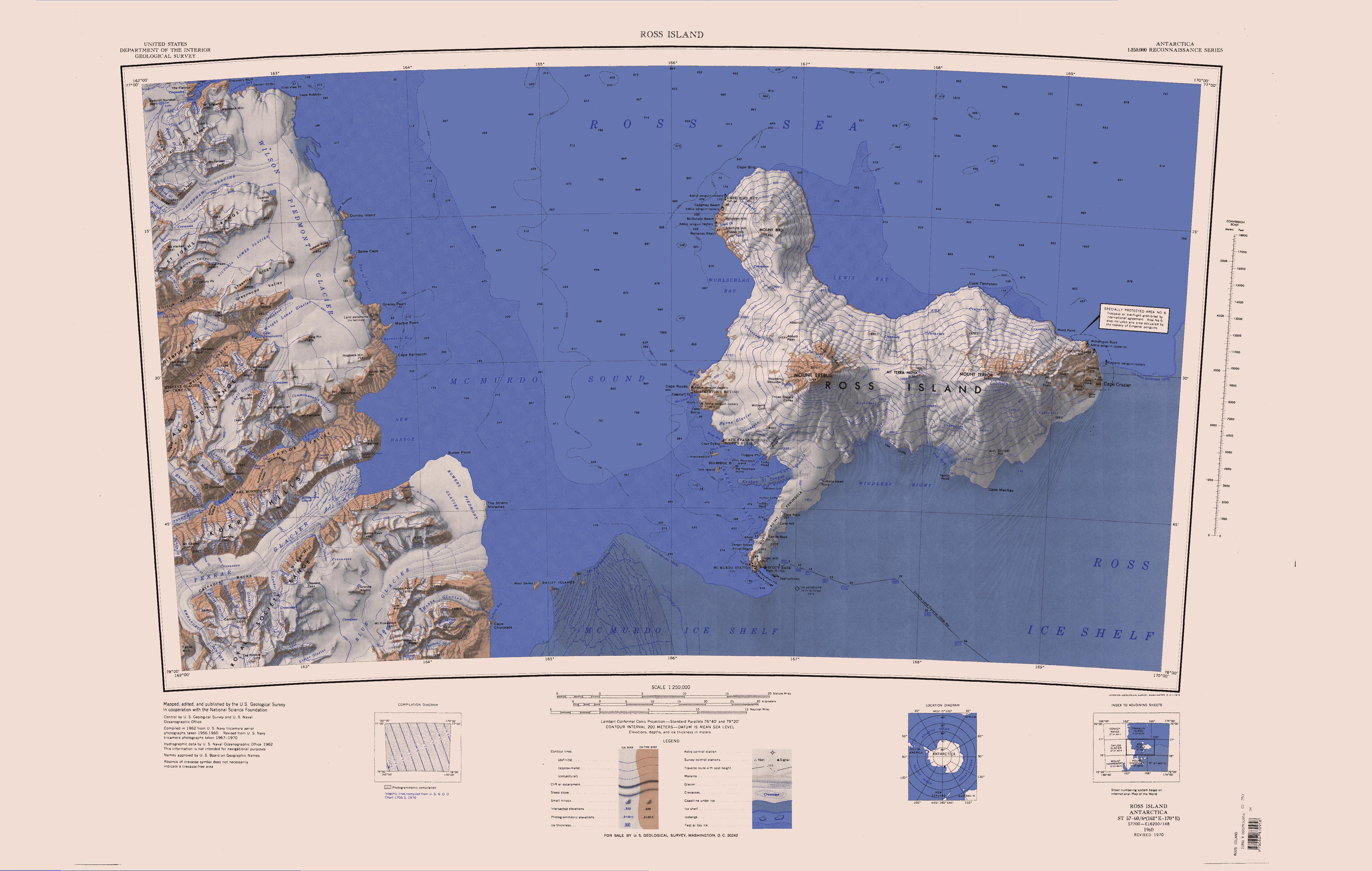
Lower Victoria Valley towards the north

Features of the Victoria Valley, from its head to its foot, include Victoria Upper Glacier, Victoria Upper Lake, Lake Vida, Packard Glacier, Clark Glacier, Victoria Lower Glacier, Baldwin Valley and Staeffler Ridge.

=== Victoria Upper Névé ===
77.26775°S 161.09418°E,}. A névé with an area of about 15 square nautical miles (51 km^{2}; 20 sq mi) at the head of Victoria Upper Glacier. The névé lies between Clare Range and Cruzen Range eastward of The Fortress. Named by United States Advisory Committee on Antarctic Names (US-ACAN) (2005) in association with Victoria Upper Glacier.

=== Victoria Upper Glacier ===
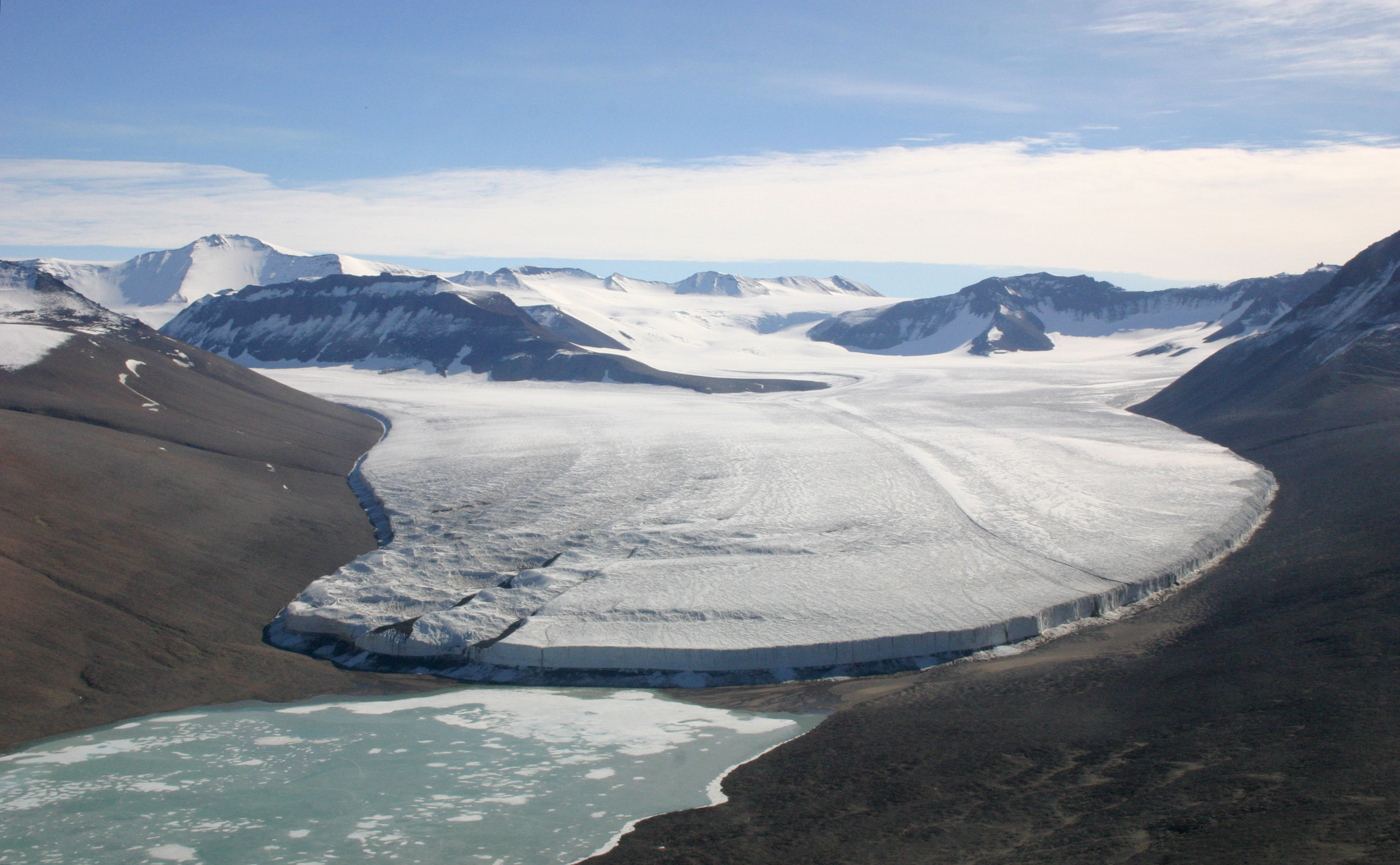
Victoria Upper Glacier, Victoria Valley, McMurdo Dry Valleys, Antarctica

77°16′S 161°25′E. Glacier occupying the upper northwest end of Victoria Valley. Named by the Victoria University of Wellington Antarctic Expedition (VUWAE: 1958-59) for their Alma Mater which sponsored the expedition.

=== Victoria Upper Lake ===
77°19′S 161°35′E. A meltwater lake at the terminus of Victoria Upper Glacier. Named for its position at the terminus of the glacier by American geologist Parker E. Calkin, in 1964.

=== Deshler Valley ===
77.320771°S 161.755235°E. A mostly ice-free valley between Spain Peak and Morse Spur in Saint Johns Range. The valley opens south to Victoria Valley. Named by US-ACAN (2005) after Terry Deshler, Department of Atmospheric Science, University of Wyoming, Laramie, WY; United States Antarctic Project (USAP) investigations addressing quantitative ozone loss and related research, 13 field seasons 1990-2004.

=== Kite Stream ===
77.385244°S 162.08523°E. A meltwater stream that flows west from Victoria Lower Glacier into Lake Vida. Named by US-ACAN after James Stephen Kite, University of Maine, geological field assistant with the Victoria Valley party, 1977-78. In the course of field search for meteorites, Kite found a 43-pound meteorite iron in a moraine 0.3 nautical miles (0.56 km; 0.35 mi) inland from Victoria Lower Glacier.

=== Lake Vida ===
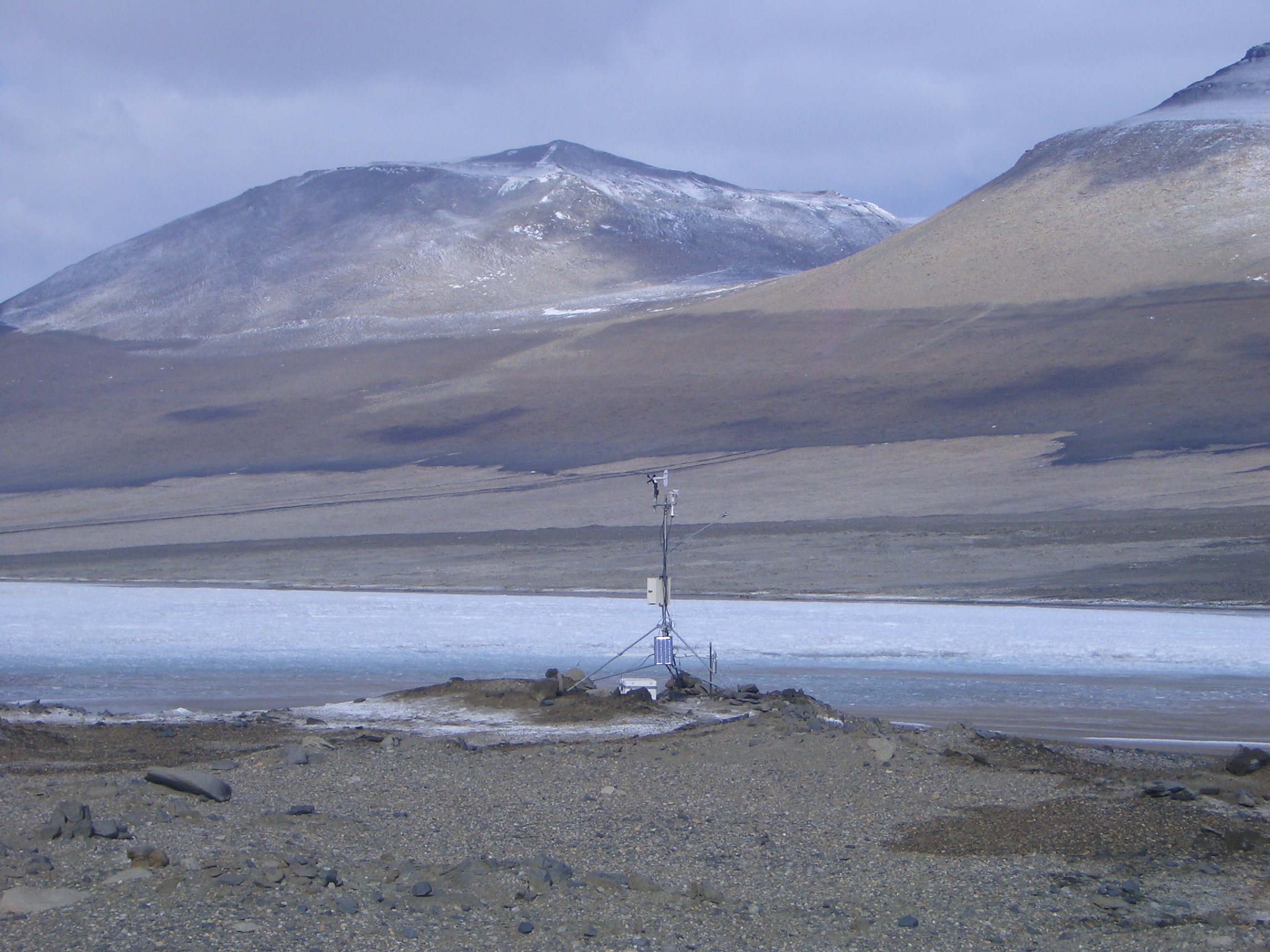
Lake Vida

77°23′S 161°57′E. A lake lying north of Mount Cerberus in the Victoria Valley. Named by the VUWAE (1958–59) after Vida (Vaida), a sledge dog of the BrAE, 1910-13.

=== Murphy Valley ===
77.428821°S 161.792704°E. An upland valley on the northeast side of Mount Booth in east Olympus Range. The valley opens north to Victoria Valley. Named by US-ACAN (2004) after Kenneth W. Murphy, Jr., United States Geological Survey (USGS) cartographic technician, a member of United States Geological Survey (USGS) satellite surveying teams at the South Pole Station during two winters, 1981 and 1987.

=== Malin Valley ===
77.43133°S 161.849729°E. An upland valley on the west side of Mount Cerberus in east Olympus Range. The valley opens north to Victoria Valley. Named by US-ACAN (2004) after Michael C. Malin, Department of Geology, Arizona State University; United States Antarctic Project (USAP) abrasion rate observations in the McMurdo Dry Valleys, 1983-84 to 1993-94.

=== Cerberus Valley ===
77.43476°S 161.94354°E. An upland valley between Mount Cerberus and Euros Ridge in east Olympus Range. The valley opens north to Victoria Valley.

=== Packard Glacier ===
77°21′S 162°10′E. Glacier just west of Purgatory Peak in the Saint Johns Range, flowing south into Victoria Valley. Mapped and named by the VUWAE, 1958–59, for Andrew Packard, summer biologist who worked in this area with the N.Z. party of the CTAE in 1957-58.

=== Lake Thomas ===
77°24′S 162°15′E. A meltwater lake that is circumscribed on the northwest and northeast sides by Robertson Ridge and Clark Glacier. Named by US-ACAN for Robert H. Thomas who participated in United States ArmyRP studies of the surface glaciology of the Ross Ice Shelf in the 1973–74 and 1974-75 seasons.

=== Clark Glacier ===
77°25′S 162°25′E. Glacier between Mount Theseus and Mount Alien, occupying a low pass in the east part of the Olympus Range. Named by the VUWAE, 1958–59, for Professor R.H. Clark, head of the Geology Dept., Victoria University of Wellington, who was immediately responsible for the sponsoring of the expedition.

=== Baldwin Valley ===
77°18′S 162°20′E. Ice-filled valley in the Saint Johns Range, lying northwest of Pond Peak. Named by US-ACAN for Russel R. Baldwin, United States Navy, who was in charge of the Airfield Maintenance Branch at McMurdo Station in 1962.

=== Victoria Lower Glacier ===
77°18′S 162°40′E. Glacier occupying the lower eastern end of Victoria Valley where it appears to merge with Wilson Piedmont Glacier. Named by the Victoria University of Wellington Antarctic Expedition (1958–59) for their Alma Mater, which sponsored the expedition.

== Sources ==
- Alberts, Fred G., ed. (1995), Geographic Names of the Antarctic (PDF) (2 ed.), United States Board on Geographic Names This article incorporates public domain material from websites or documents of the United States Board on Geographic Names.
- Cerberus Valley, AADC: Australian Antarctic Data Centre
- "Deshler Valley", Geographic Names Information System, United States Geological Survey, United States Department of the Interior
- "Malin Valley", Geographic Names Information System, United States Geological Survey, United States Department of the Interior
- "Murphy Valley", Geographic Names Information System, United States Geological Survey, United States Department of the Interior
- Ross Island, USGS: United States Geological Survey
- Taylor Glacier, USGS: United States Geological Survey
- "Victoria Upper Névé", Geographic Names Information System, United States Geological Survey, United States Department of the Interior

This article incorporates public domain material from websites or documents of the United States Geological Survey.
