= Dorsa Harker =

Dorsa Harker is a wrinkle ridge at 14.5°N 64.0°E in Mare Crisium on the Moon. It is 213 km long and was named after Alfred Harker, an English petrologist, in 1976.
