= Saint Johns Range =

Mountain range in Antarctica

- Location within Antarctica

Geography
- Continent: Antarctica
- Region: Victoria Land
- Range coordinates: 77°17′S 162°0′E

Saint Johns Range (77°17′S 162°0′E) is a crescent-shaped mountain range about 20 nautical miles (37 km; 23 mi) long, in Victoria Land, Antarctica. It is bounded on the north by the Cotton Glacier, Miller Glacier and Debenham Glacier, and on the south by Victoria Valley and the Victoria Upper Glacier and Victoria Lower Glacier.

== Name ==
Saint Johns Range was named by the New Zealand Northern Survey Party of the Commonwealth Trans-Antarctic Expedition (CTAE), 1956–58, which surveyed peaks in the range in 1957. Named for St John's College, Cambridge, England, with which several members of the British Antarctic Expedition, 1910–13 were associated during the writing of their scientific reports, and in association with the adjacent Gonville and Caius Range.

== Location ==
Saint Johns Range is bounded to the west by the Victoria Upper Glacier and the Victoria Valley, which runs in a south-southeast direction to Lake Vida. Below Lake Vida the Victoria Valley turns to an east-northeast direction. It is filled by the Victoria Lower Glacier in its lower end, which flows into the Wilson Piedmont Glacier, lying along the west coast of the Ross Sea. The Victoria Valley separates Saint Johns Range from the Cruzen Range to the west and the Olympus Range to the south. The north of the range is separated from the Clare Range by the Cotton Glacier. The Miller Glacier defines the northeast side of the range, flowing into the Debenham Glacier, which defines the north side of the southern arm of the range and terminates in the Wilson Piedmont Glacier. The Gonville and Caius Range is to the north of the Debenham Glacier.

== Northwest features ==
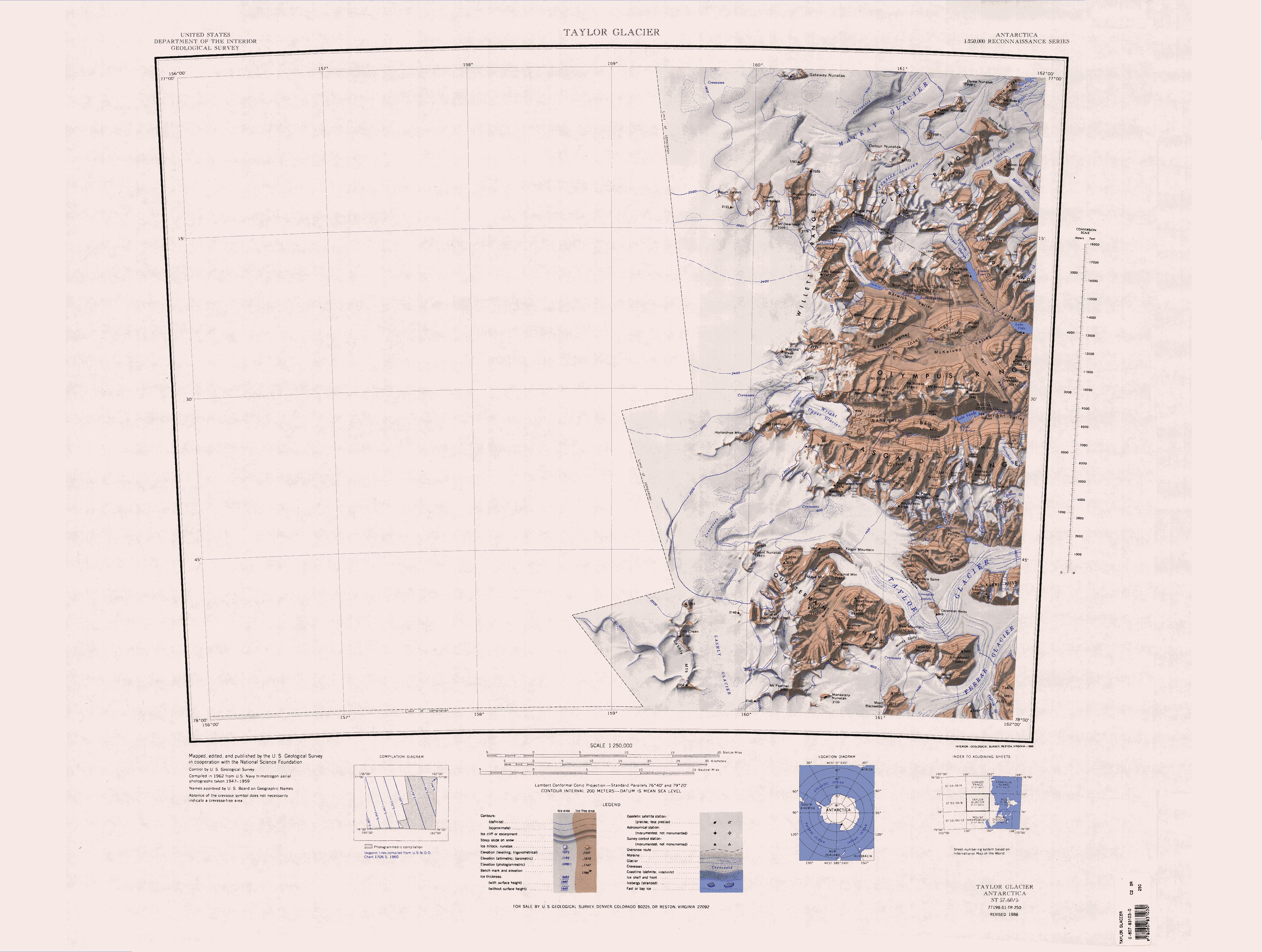
West part of Saint Johns Range in north east

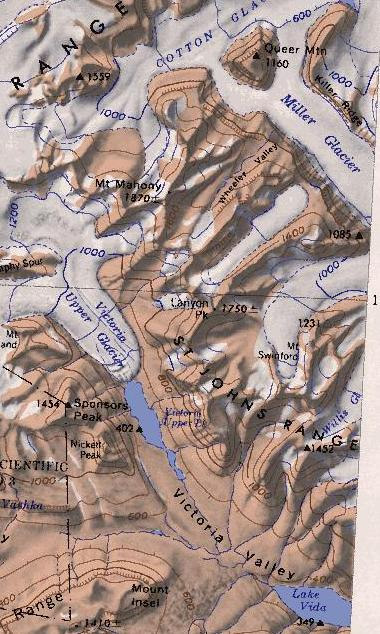
West part of the Saint Johns Range

Features from the northern tip of Saint Johns Range south to Broady Valley are, from north to south: Marchetti Glacier, Gargoyle Turrets, Helicopter Mountains, Mount Mahony, Wheeler Valley, Rutherford Ridge, Mount Rowland, Lobeck Glacier, Kuivinen Ridge, Mount Lewis, Watson Valley, Lanyon Peak and Broady Valley.

=== Marchetti Glacier ===
77.158836°S 161.495082°E. A glacier flowing from the north slope of Mount Mahony into Cotton Glacier. Named by the Advisory Committee on Antarctic Names (US-ACAN) (2007) after Peter Anthony Marchetti who made 20 deployments to McMurdo Sound in the period 1987-2007, including seven winters; Camp Manager for the United States Antarctic Program’s Telecommunications Facility on Black Island, Ross Archipelago for 11 austral summers from 1996.

=== Gargoyle Turrets ===
77.164133°S 161.682095°E. A group of three prominent sandstone buttresses rising to about 1,300 metres (4,300 ft) at the top of steep cliffs above Miller Glacier in northwest Saint Johns Range. The group stands 1.5 nautical miles (2.8 km; 1.7 mi) southwest of Queer Mountain. So named by the New Zealand Geographic Board (NZGB; 2006) because the massive upper sandstone unit has weathered into steep and cavernously sculptured tors which, when seen from below, have the appearance of gargoyle carvings.

=== Helicopter Mountains ===
77.190839°S 161.430568°E. A series of rugged mountains west of Mount Mahony, rising to 1,700 metres (5,600 ft) at Mount James and including also from west to east Touchstone Crag, Mick Peak and Hott Peak. The mountains form the northwest end of Saint Johns Range. So named by US-ACAN (2007) in recognition of the wide use of helicopters in supporting the United States Antarctic Program at McMurdo Sound and McMurdo Dry Valleys. Peaks in the mountains have been named after personnel in the helicopter group.

=== Mount Mahony ===
77°12′S 161°35′E. A massive mountain, 1,870 metres (6,140 ft) high, standing just east of the head of Victoria Upper Glacier. Mapped by the Western Geological Party, led by Thomas Griffith Taylor, of the British Antarctic Expedition, 1910–13. Named for D. Mahony, geologist, of Melbourne, Australia.

=== Wheeler Valley ===
77°12′S 161°44′E. The ice-free hanging valley on the southwest side of Miller Glacier, immediately east of Mount Mahony in Victoria Land. Named by the Victoria University of Wellington Antarctic Expedition (VUWAE) (1959-60) for R.H. Wheeler, the party's deputy leader and surveyor.

=== Rutherford Ridge ===
77.2071°S 161.729157°E A transverse ridge, 5.5 nautical miles (10.2 km; 6.3 mi) long, extending southwest–northeast across Saint Johns Range between Wheeler Valley and Lobeck Glacier. The ridge rises to 1,550 metres (5,090 ft) in Mount Rowland. Named by US-ACAN (2007) after Ernest Rutherford, 1st Baron of Nelson and Cambridge (1871-1937), British physicist of New Zealand birth and winner of the Nobel Prize in Chemistry for 1908. His researches in radiation and atomic structure were basic to the later 20th-century developments in nuclear physics.

=== Mount Rowland ===
77.212885°S 161.710648°E. A mountain with a sharp-pointed summit rising to 1,550 metres (5,090 ft) in the central part of Rutherford Ridge. Named by US-ACAN (2007) after F. Sherwood Rowland, Professor of Chemistry, University of California at Irvine, winner of the Nobel Prize in Chemistry for 1995. The Royal Swedish Academy of Sciences awarded the 1995 Nobel Prize in Chemistry to Professor Paul J. Crutzen, Max-Planck-Institute for Chemistry, Mainz, Germany (Dutch citizen); Professor Mario Molina, Department of Earth, Atmospheric and Planetary Sciences and Department of Chemistry, MIT, Cambridge, MA, United States Army; and Professor F. Sherwood Rowland, Department of Chemistry, University of California, Irvine, CA, United States Army “for their work in atmospheric chemistry, particularly concerning the formation and decomposition of ozone.”

=== Lobeck Glacier ===
77.217007°S 161.781684°E. A glacier flowing northeast between Rutherford Ridge and Kuivinen Ridge. About 4 nautical miles (7.4 km; 4.6 mi) long, the glacier terminates upon rock cliffs overlooking Miller Glacier with insignificant if any flow entering it. Named by Advisory Committee on Antarctic Names (US-ACAN) (2007) after noted American geographer-geologist Armin K. Lobeck (1886-1958), Professor of Geology, Columbia University, New York, NY, 1929-54; author of the textbook Geomorphology, McGraw-Hill, 1939 widely used in training geomorphologists active in Antarctica.

=== Kuivinen Ridge ===
77.233254°S 161.776278°E A transverse ridge extending southwest–northeast across St. Johns Range between an unnamed glacier and the Ringer Glacier. The ridge is 5 nautical miles (9.3 km; 5.8 mi) long and rises to 1,750 metres (5,740 ft) high at Lanyon Peak. Named by US-ACAN (2005) after ice coring specialist Karl C. Kuivinen, University of Nebraska, Lincoln, NE, 1974-2003; Field Operations Manager, Ross Ice Shelf Project Management Office, UNL, 1974-78; Director, Polar Ice Coring Office, UNL, 1979-89 and 1994-2001; 15 summer field seasons in Antarctica, 1968-2000; 24 summer field seasons in Greenland and Alaska 1974-99.

=== Mount Lewis ===
77.241227°S 161.511475°E. A mountain rising to 1,450 metres (4,760 ft) at the southwest end of Rutherford Ridge. A rock gable on the southwest face of the mountain provides an easily recognized landmark when viewed from southward. Named by US-ACAN (2007) after Adam R. Lewis, research assistant professor at North Dakota State University who has made significant contributions to understanding the Late Cenozoic vegetation history of the McMurdo Dry Valleys.

=== Watson Valley ===
77.23986°S 161.56795°E. A valley east of Mount Lewis. The valley, which opens southward to Victoria Upper Glacier, is ice free except for a small glacier at the head wall. Named by US-ACAN (2007) after HM2 Donald E. Watson, United States Navy (Seabees), who at the time was Medical Assistant and member of the construction crew which built the original Little America V Station and the original Byrd Station in the 1955-57 pre-IGY period. He was the medical person on the oversnow Byrd Traverse to Byrd Station, 1956.

=== Lanyon Peak ===
77°15′S 161°41′E. A sharp rock peak 2.5 nautical miles (4.6 km; 2.9 mi) east of Victoria Upper Glacier. Named by US-ACAN for Margaret C. Lanyon, a New Zealand national who for many years in the 1960's and 1970's served in a secretarial and administrative capacity with the United States Antarctic Research Program, in Christchurch.

=== Broady Valley ===
77.257198°S 161.590799°E. A steeply inclined valley, 1.5 nautical miles (2.8 km; 1.7 mi) long, lying west of Lanyon Peak. The valley opens southwest to the snout of Victoria Upper Glacier. Named by the New Zealand Geographic Board (2005) after Paul Broady, University of Melbourne (later University of Canterbury, New Zealand), a microbial biologist who worked with the NZAP for eight seasons from 1981, at McMurdo Dry Valleys, Ross Island, Marie Byrd Land, and other areas; with British Antarctic Survey (BAS) at Signy Island, 1970s; with Australian National Antarctic Research Expeditions (ANARE) early 1980s.

== Central Features ==
Features from Spain Peak east to Dahe Glacier are, from west to east, Spain Peak, Anu Whakatoro Glacier, Tūkeri Peak, Fenwick Glacier, Ringer Valley, Ringer Glacier, Templeton Peak, Mount Swinford, Stone Ridge, Wise Ridge and Dahe Glacier.

=== Spain Peak ===
77.296226°S 161.692352°E. A peak rising to 1,450 metres (4,760 ft) high on the west side of Deshler Valley. Named by US-ACAN (2005) after Rae Spain, who from 1979 to 2004 completed 22 field season deployments in various positions held for United States Antarctic Project (USAP) support contractors at the McMurdo, Siple, Palmer, and South Pole Stations, and at remote field camp stations.

=== Anu Whakatoro Glacier ===
77.289258°S 161.693008°E. A glacier, 0.7 nautical miles (1.3 km; 0.81 mi) long, between Tūkeri Peak and Spain Peak on the headwall of Ringer Valley. “Anu Whakatoro” is a Maori word, meaning force of wind, and was applied descriptively to this glacier by the New Zealand Geographic Board in 2005.

=== Tūkeri Peak ===
77.2819444°S 161.6919444°E. A peak rising to 1,400 metres (4,600 ft) high at the head of Ringer Valley. The peak stands midway between Mount Majerus and Spain Peak on the principal ridge of Saint Johns Range. “Tūkeri” is a Maori wind word, meaning force of wind, and was applied descriptively to this peak by the New Zealand Geographic Board in 2005.

=== Fenwick Glacier ===
77.271818°S 161.706918°E. A glacier, 0.6 nautical miles (1.1 km; 0.69 mi) long, between Mount Majerus and Tūkeri Peak on the headwall of Ringer Valley. Named by the New Zealand Geographic Board (2005) after John Fenwick, a Ministry of Works hydrology technician, who led field parties on visits to this area in 1972-73 and 1973-74.

=== Mount Majerus ===
77.27111°S 161.65417°E. A peak rising to 1,635 metres (5,364 ft) at the south end of Kuivinen Ridge. The peak is 1 nautical mile (1.9 km; 1.2 mi) southwest of Lanyon Peak. Named by US-ACAN (2005) after four members of the Majerus family of Rochester, MN, who engaged in various science support activities in many field seasons, 1980-2005, predominately at the McMurdo Station: Nicholas D. Majerus, 13 seasons; his daughter Michelle R. Majerus, 10 seasons; his brother Gregory J. Majerus, 15 seasons; and Gregory's daughter, Nicole R. Majerus, 4 seasons.

=== Ringer Valley ===
77.269949°S 161.782046°E. A hanging valley 6 nautical miles (11 km; 6.9 mi) long between Kuivinen Ridge and Stone Ridge. The lower and middle portion of the valley is occupied by Ringer Glacier, which flows north to Miller Glacier; the upper (south) portion is mostly ice free. Named by US-ACAN (2005) in association with Ringer Glacier and The Ringer.

=== Ringer Glacier ===
77.239631°S 161.917402°E. A glacier, 5 nautical miles (9.3 km; 5.8 mi) long, heading on the northeast flank of Saint Johns Range and flowing northeast to Miller Glacier. Named in association with the distinctive moraine at its mouth, The Ringer. The name first appeared on a 1961 NZ map; approved by Advisory Committee on Antarctic Names (US-ACAN) in 1995.

=== Templeton Peak ===
77.292519°S 161.839873°E. A peak rising to about 1,400 metres (4,600 ft) high on the ridge between the head of Ringer Valley and Deshler Valley. The peak is 1.4 nautical miles (2.6 km; 1.6 mi) southwest of Mount Swinford. Named by the NZGB (2005) after Malcolm Templeton, former New Zealand Foreign Service officer, who held a number of senior positions including that of permanent representative to the United Nations, and Deputy Secretary of Foreign Affairs; author of A Wise Adventure – New Zealand and Antarctica 1920 – 1960.

=== Mount Swinford ===
77°16′S 161°54′E. A peak 2.75 nautical miles (5.09 km; 3.16 mi) west-northwest of Mount Harker in Saint Johns Range, Victoria Land. Named by US-ACAN for Lieutenant Commander Harold D. Swinford, United States Navy (CEC), who served with the Navy Nuclear Power Unit at McMurdo Station, wintering over there in 1963 and 1968.

=== Stone Ridge ===
77.25734°S 161.926923°E. A ridge surmounted by Mount Swinford, 1,550 metres (5,090 ft) high, extending southwest–northeast between Ringer Glacier and Dahe Glacier. Named by US-ACAN (2005) after Brian Stone, United States Antarctic Project (USAP) logistics specialist with Antarctic Support Associates from 1990; Science Cargo Coordinator for McMurdo Station cargo, 1992-95; Terminal Operations Manager, McMurdo Station, 1995-97; Terminal Operations Manager, Christchurch, NZ, 1997-2000; Research Support Manager, OPP, NSF, 2000-05.

=== Dahe Glacier ===
77.255169°S 162.015621°E. A glacier flowing northeast between Stone Ridge and Wise Ridge. It terminates as a hanging glacier on a bluff 200 metres (660 ft) high above the head of Debenham Glacier. Named by US-ACAN (2005) after Qin Dahe, Director of the Chinese National Meteorological Administration; manager, Great Wall Station for two years in 1980s; co-author of studies on distribution, transport and range of chemicals recovered from surface snow and ice cores in traverses from Zhongshan Station to Dome Argus, 1996-2002.

=== Wise Ridge ===
77.269329°S 161.992783°E. A sharp-crested ridge, 4 nautical miles (7.4 km; 4.6 mi) long, extending southwest–northeast between Dahe Glacier and Willis Glacier. Peaks on the ridge rise 1,200 to 1,525 metres (3,937 to 5,003 ft) high above sea level. Named by US-ACAN (2005) after Sherwood W. Wise, Jr., Antarctic Marine Geology Research Facility, Florida State University, Tallahassee, FL, who had a significant part in the planning, coring, analyzing, and storage of Southern Ocean geological specimens, 1973-2004.

== Southern Features ==
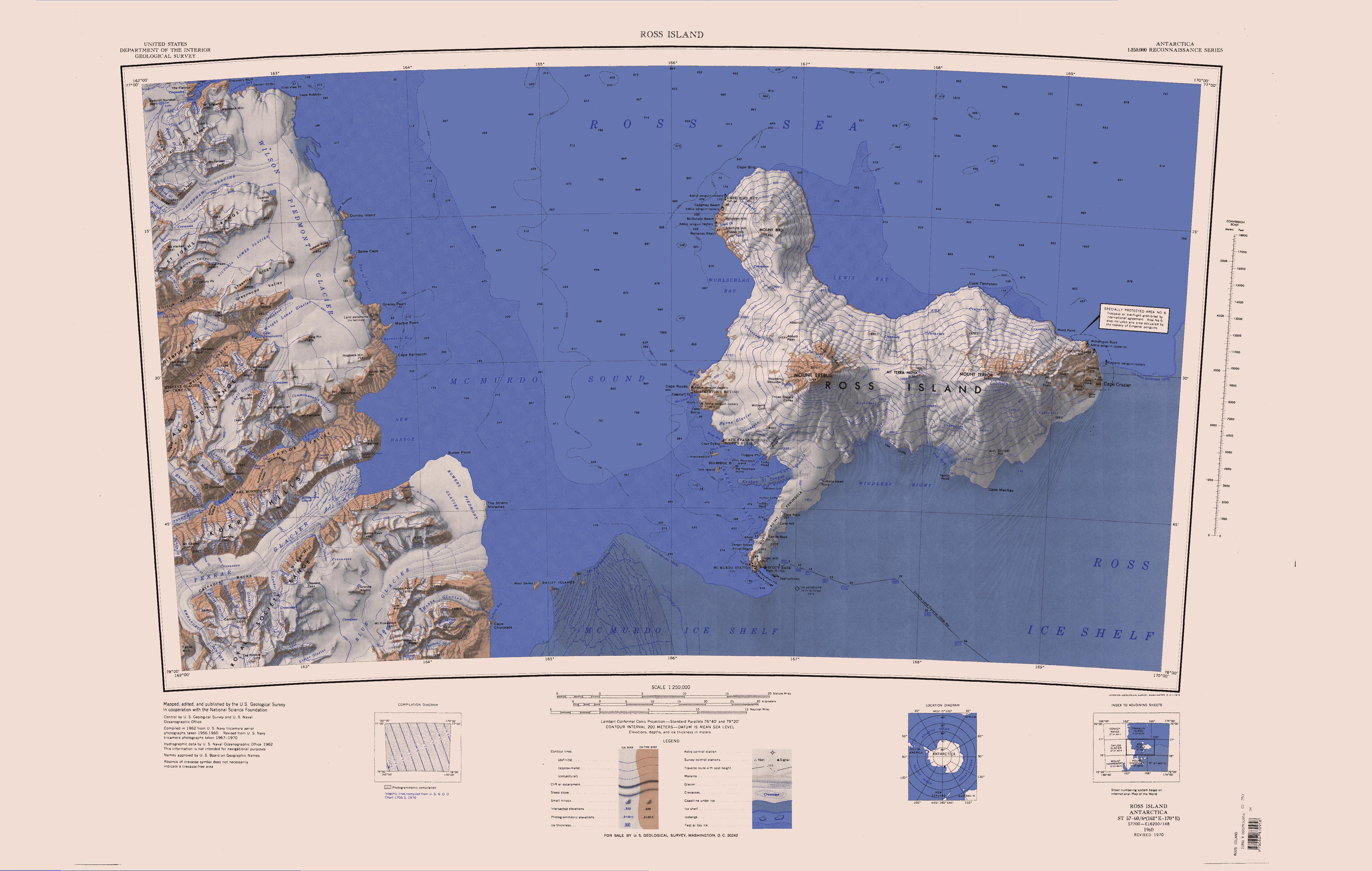
East part of Saint Johns Range in north west

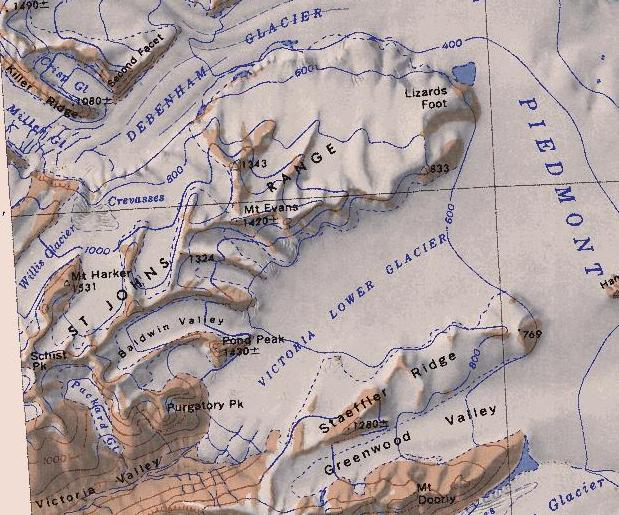
East part of the Saint Johns Range

Features from Morse Spur to Pond Peak are, from west to east, Morse Spur, Crawford Valley, Bowser Valley, Mautino Peak, Schist Peak, Mount Harker, Purgatory Peak, Mayeswki Peak and Pond Peak.

=== Morse Spur ===
77.336414°S 161.814363°E. A spur projecting south from St. Johns Range between Deshler Valley and Crawford Valley. Named by US-ACAN) (2005) after David L. Morse, Institute for Geophysics, University of Texas, Austin, TX; ten Antarctic field seasons, 1990-2004, including four at Taylor Dome ice core site, three conducting aerogeophysical research in both East and West Antarctica, and three seasons of ground-based studies of Bindschadler Ice Stream, West Antarctica, and Taylor Glacier, Victoria Land.

=== Crawford Valley ===
77.32679°S 161.844452°E. A valley which is ice free except at the headwall, lying between Deshler Valley and Bowser Valley. Named by US-ACAN (2005) after photographer Neelon Crawford, a participant in the National Science Foundation’s Antarctic Artists and Writers Program, five field seasons 1989-94.

=== Bowser Valley ===
77.335059°S 161.912009°E. A valley that encloses a small glacier at the headwall, lying east of Crawford Valley. Named by US-ACAN (2005) after Samuel S. Bowser, Division of Molecular Medicine, New York State Department of Health, Albany, NY, who conducted research of giant foraminifera in McMurdo Sound, 10 field seasons 1984-2004.

=== Mautino Peak ===
77°21′S 162°03′E. A peak at the west side of Packard Glacier in the Saint Johns Range, Victoria Land. Named by US-ACAN for Commander Richard L. Mautino, United States Navy, officer-in-charge of the Naval Support Force winter-over detachment at McMurdo Station in 1972.

=== Schist Peak ===
77°19′S 162°00′E A peak, 1,650 metres (5,410 ft) high, surmounting the divide between the Willis and Packard Glaciers in the Saint Johns Range of Victoria Land. Named by the VUWAE (1959-60) for the rock type of which it is composed.

=== Mount Harker ===
77°18′S 162°05′E. A peak at the east side of Willis Glacier in Saint Johns Range, in Victoria Land. Charted by the BrAE under Scott, 1910-13, and named for Doctor Alfred Harker, noted British petrologist.

=== Purgatory Peak ===
77°21′S 162°18′E. Peak 2 nautical miles (3.7 km; 2.3 mi) southwest of Pond peak in the Saint Johns Range of Victoria Land. So named by the N.Z. Northern Survey Party of the CTAE, 1956-58, because of the extremely trying weather and surface conditions encountered while traveling toward and surveying from this peak.

=== Mayewski Peak ===
77°18′S 162°14′E. A peak in the Saint Johns Range of Victoria Land, located midway on the ridge that bounds the north side of Baldwin Valley. Named by US-ACAN for Paul A. Mayewski who participated in United States ArmyRP glaciological and geological work at the McMurdo Station area (1968-69), McGregor Glacier (1970-71), Willett and Convoy Ranges (1971-72) and Rennick Glacier (1974-75).

=== Pond Peak ===
77°19′S 162°24′E. Conspicuous ice-free peak, 1,430 metres (4,690 ft) high, at the south side of the mouth of Baldwin Valley in Saint Johns Range. Named by US-ACAN in 1964 after James D. Pond, United States Navy, who was in charge of electronic repair and maintenance at Hallett Station, 1962.

== Eastern features ==
Features to the east of Pond Peak are: McWhinnie Peak, Mount Evans, Mount Bevilacqua, Sechrist Ridge and Lizard Foot-

=== McWhinnie Peak ===
77°16′S 162°14′E. A peak 2 nautical miles (3.7 km; 2.3 mi) northeast of Mount Harker. Named by US-ACAN for Mary A. McWhinnie, USARP biologist who wintered-over at McMurdo Station in 1974. She worked on several Antarctic cruises in USNS Eltanin between 1962 and 1972.

=== Mount Evans ===
77°15′S 162°29′E. Mountain with a double summit rising to 1,420 metres (4,660 ft) high, dominating the central part of Saint Johns Range. Discovered by the British National Antarctic Expedition (BrNAE) (1901–04) under Robert Falcon Scott, who named it for Lieutenant Edward R.G.R. Evans (later Admiral Lord Mountevans) of the Morning, relief ship to the expedition. It was from this mountain that he took his "Mountevans."

=== Mount Bevilacqua ===
77.2322222°S 162.4791667°E. A mostly ice-free mountain 1,164 metres (3,819 ft) high, 1.5 nautical miles (2.8 km; 1.7 mi) north of Mount Evans. The summit is situated at the union of Y-shaped ridge lines north of Mount Evans. Named by US-ACAN (2007) after CW04 Charles A. Bevilacqua, Civil Engineer Corps (CEC), United States Navy (Seabees), who at the time was the senior enlisted construction Builder Chief and member of the construction crew, which built the original McMurdo Station and the original South Pole Station in the 1955-57 pre-IGY (International Geophysical Year) period.

=== Sechrist Ridge ===
77.2258333°S 162.6197222°E. A narrow rock spur, 3 nautical miles (5.6 km; 3.5 mi) long, descending northeast from the central ridge just east of Mount Evans and terminating 1 nautical mile (1.9 km; 1.2 mi) east of Mount Bevilacqua. Named by US-ACAN (2007) after Daniel Robert Sechrist, U. S. Geological Survey geographer from 1980 involved in traditional mapping, digital mapping and mapping research; from 2004, Manager of the United States Antarctic Resource Center at United States Geological Survey (USGS), Reston, VA; a member of the United States Geological Survey (USGS) Survey team deployed to McMurdo Dry Valleys, November-December 2004.

=== Lizards Foot ===
77°13′S 162°51′E. Rocky spur forming the east end of the Saint Johns Range. Charted and named by the BrAE under Scott, 1910-13.

== Sources ==
- Alberts, Fred G., ed. (1995), Geographic Names of the Antarctic (PDF) (2 ed.), United States Board on Geographic Names This article incorporates public domain material from websites or documents of the United States Board on Geographic Names.
- "Anu Whakatoro Glacier", Geographic Names Information System, United States Geological Survey, United States Department of the Interior
- "Dahe Glacier", Geographic Names Information System, United States Geological Survey, United States Department of the Interior
- "Fenwick Glacier", Geographic Names Information System, United States Geological Survey, United States Department of the Interior
- "Kuivinen Ridge", Geographic Names Information System, United States Geological Survey, United States Department of the Interior
- "Lobeck Glacier", Geographic Names Information System, United States Geological Survey, United States Department of the Interior
- "Marchetti Glacier", Geographic Names Information System, United States Geological Survey, United States Department of the Interior
- Mount Majerus, AADC: Australian Antarctic Data Centre
- "Ringer Glacier", Geographic Names Information System, United States Geological Survey, United States Department of the Interior
- Ross Island, USGS: United States Geological Survey
- "Rutherford Ridge", Geographic Names Information System, United States Geological Survey, United States Department of the Interior
- Taylor Glacier, USGS: United States Geological Survey
- "Bowser Valley", Geographic Names Information System, United States Geological Survey, United States Department of the Interior
- "Broady Valley", Geographic Names Information System, United States Geological Survey, United States Department of the Interior
- "Crawford Valley", Geographic Names Information System, United States Geological Survey, United States Department of the Interior
- "Gargoyle Turrets", Geographic Names Information System, United States Geological Survey, United States Department of the Interior
- "Helicopter Mountains", Geographic Names Information System, United States Geological Survey, United States Department of the Interior
- "Morse Spur", Geographic Names Information System, United States Geological Survey, United States Department of the Interior
- "Mount Bevilacqua", Geographic Names Information System, United States Geological Survey, United States Department of the Interior
- "Mount Lewis", Geographic Names Information System, United States Geological Survey, United States Department of the Interior
- "Mount Rowland", Geographic Names Information System, United States Geological Survey, United States Department of the Interior
- "Ringer Valley", Geographic Names Information System, United States Geological Survey, United States Department of the Interior
- "Sechrist Ridge", Geographic Names Information System, United States Geological Survey, United States Department of the Interior
- "Spain Peak", Geographic Names Information System, United States Geological Survey, United States Department of the Interior
- "Stone Ridge", Geographic Names Information System, United States Geological Survey, United States Department of the Interior
- "Templeton Peak", Geographic Names Information System, United States Geological Survey, United States Department of the Interior
- "Tūkeri Peak", Geographic Names Information System, United States Geological Survey, United States Department of the Interior
- "Watson Valley", Geographic Names Information System, United States Geological Survey, United States Department of the Interior
- "Wise Ridge", Geographic Names Information System, United States Geological Survey, United States Department of the Interior

This article incorporates public domain material from websites or documents of the United States Geological Survey.
