= Harkness =

Harkness may refer to:

- Harkness (surname)
- The Harkness Ballet
- Harkness Fellowship, an international health policy fellowship
- Harkness Memorial State Park, a 230-acre park and mansion in Waterford, Connecticut
- Harkness rating system, a chess rating system used from 1950 to 1960.
- Harkness table, a style of teaching
- Harkness Tower, a Gothic structure at Yale University
- Rosa 'Anne Harkness', a rose variety
- Harkness, Victoria, a western suburb of Melbourne, in the City of Melton
