= George R. Harker =

American cyberspace philosopher (1943–2020)

George R. Harker (September 26, 1943 - March 4, 2020), (A.K.A. Dr. Leisure) was an author and self-styled "cyberspace philosopher". He held bachelor's and master's degrees in Philosophy from Ohio State University, and a Ph.D. from Texas A&M University, and had taught for 21 years at Western Illinois University before being terminated. He had written many articles concerning the naturist movement, and contributed to the book Recreational Nudity and the Law by Gordon Gill. He was founder of the Church and School of International Détente, a lecturer and a book publisher. He died in 2020 in Hawaii.

== Works ==
- "Nude bathing, no controversy". Parks & Recreation, USA. 22 (8): 48–61. 1987.
- 1990 - Creation and Management Guide to Clothing Optional Beaches and Parks (American Sunbathing Association)
- He Wouldn't Drink the Hemlock: The Firing of Dr. Leisure. Dr. Leisure. 1993. ISBN 978-0-9638802-1-5.
- The Mammoth Incident. Dr. Leisure. 1995. ISBN 978-0-9638802-7-7.
- 1995 - Recreational Nudity and the Law by Gordon Gill (Contributor) ISBN 0-9638802-8-4
- 1998 - The Mostly True Life Adventures of Dr. Leisure: (On Second Thought, I'll Drink the Hemlock: The Decline of Western Illinois University) ISBN 1-887471-08-1, ISBN 978-1-887471-08-4
- 1998 - The Intelligent Decision: How We Think! ISBN 0-9638802-3-3
- 2001 - The Mostly True Life Adventures of Dr. Leisure Vol. II (1st edition) ISBN 1-887471-09-X
- 2002 - He Wouldn't Drink the Hemlock: The Firing of Dr. Leisure (2nd Special Hawaii edition) ISBN 1-887471-31-6
