= List of landforms of South Georgia =

Geographical features of an Antarctic island

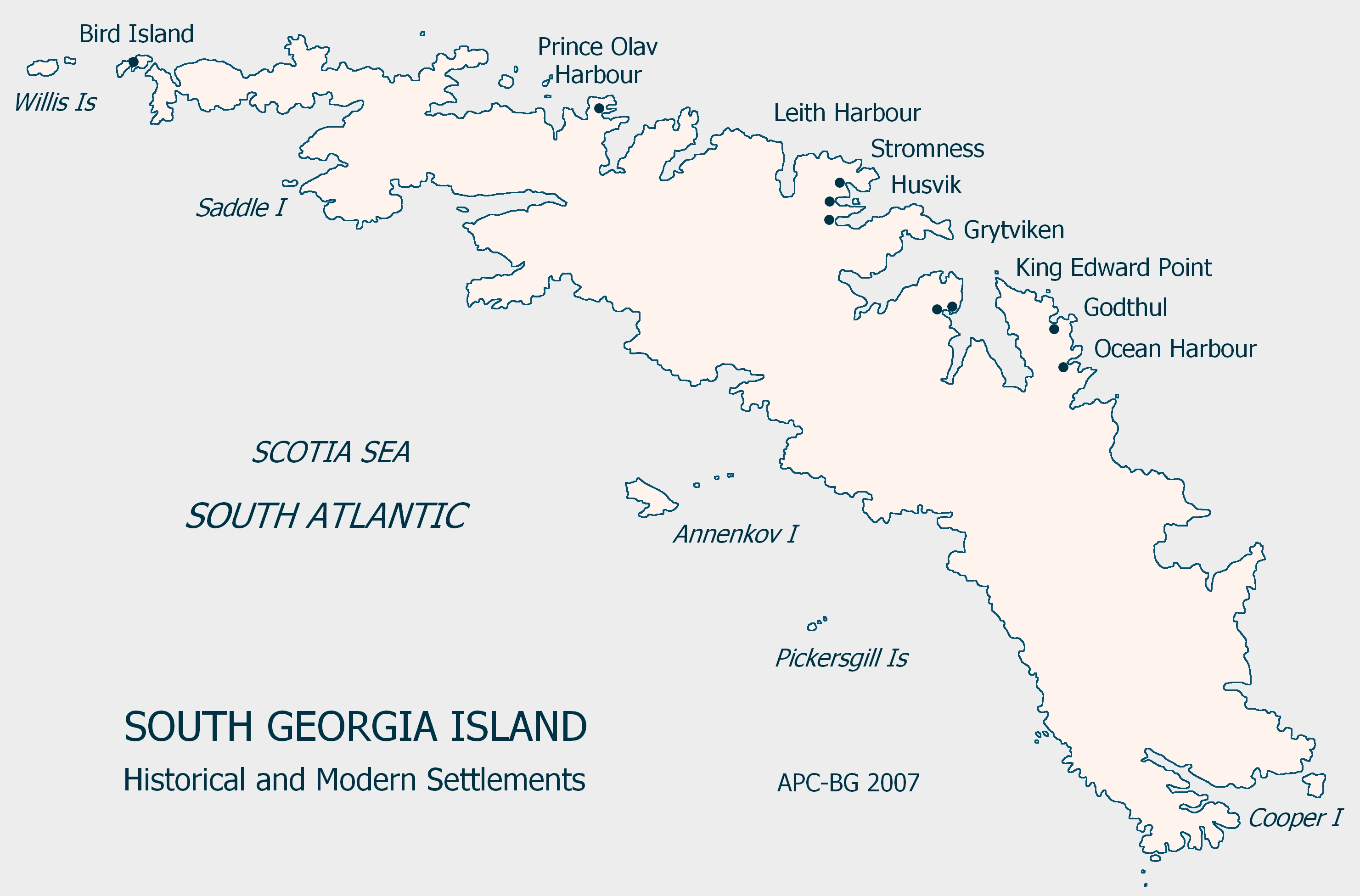
Historical and modern settlements on South Georgia

South Georgia Island has been explored and charted by various Antarctic expeditions. As a result, the island has an extensive number of notable named geographical features.

== Bodies of water ==
=== Bays ===
- Antarctic Bay
- Bjornstadt Bay
- Cheapman Bay
- Church Bay
- Cook Bay
- Cooper Bay
- Cumberland Bay
- Cumberland East Bay
- Cumberland West Bay
- Damien Bay
- Doris Bay
- Doubtful Bay
- Drygalski Fjord
- Elsehul
- Esbensen Bay
- Fortuna Bay
- Frida Hole
- Godthul
- Hamilton Bay
- Hercules Bay
- Hound Bay
- Ice Fjord
- Iris Bay
- Bay of Isles
- Jacobsen Bight
- Jason Harbour
- Jossac Bight
- Kelp Bay
- King Edward Cove
- King Haakon Bay
- Larsen Harbour
- Little Moltke Harbor
- Luisa Bay
- Queen Maud Bay
- Moraine Fjord
- Newark Bay
- Novosilski Bay
- Ocean Harbour
- Possession Bay
- Right Whale Bay
- Rocky Bay
- Rogged Bay
- Royal Bay
- Sacramento Bight
- Schlieper Bay
- St Andrews Bay
- Stromness Bay
- Tornquist Bay
- Trollhul
- Undine Harbour
- Undine South Harbour
- Wilson Harbour
- Windy Cove

=== Coves ===
- Alert Cove
- Diaz Cove
- Elephant Cove
- Jumbo Cove
- Smaaland Cove

=== Glaciers ===
- Austin Glacier
- Bary Glacier
- Bertrab Glacier
- Bogen Glacier
- Briggs Glacier
- Brøgger Glacier
- Brunonia Glacier
- Buxton Glacier
- Christensen Glacier
- Christophersen Glacier
- Clayton Glacier
- Cook Glacier
- Crean Glacier
- Dead End Glacier
- Eclipse Glacier
- Esmark Glacier
- Fortuna Glacier
- Geikie Glacier
- Graae Glacier
- Grace Glacier
- Hamberg Glacier
- Harker Glacier
- Harmer Glacier
- Heaney Glacier
- Helland Glacier
- Henningsen Glacier
- Herz Glacier
- Hindle Glacier
- Hodges Glacier
- Jenkins Glacier
- Jewell Glacier
- Keilhau Glacier
- Kjerulf Glacier
- König Glacier
- Lancing Glacier
- Lewald Glacier
- Lucas Glacier
- Lyell Glacier
- Morris Glacier
- Nachtigal Glacier
- Neumayer Glacier
- Nordenskjöld Glacier
- Novosilski Glacier
- Paget Glacier
- Peters Glacier
- Philippi Glacier
- Price Glacier
- Purvis Glacier
- Quensel Glacier
- Risting Glacier
- Ross Glacier
- Ryan Glacier
- Salomon Glacier
- Schrader Glacier
- Spenceley Glacier
- Storey Glacier
- Twitcher Glacier
- Tyrrell Glacier
- Webb Glacier
- Weddell Glacier
- Wheeler Glacier

=== Lakes ===
- Gulbrandsen Lake
- Gull Lake
- Hamberg Lakes
- Lyell Lake
- Parochlus Lake

== Landforms ==
=== Headlands ===
- Cape Alexandra
- Antarctic Point
- Aspasia Point
- Aucellina Point
- Austin Head
- Barff Peninsula
- Begg Point
- Bjelland Point
- Cape Buller
- Busen Point
- Calf Head
- Chaplin Head
- Cape Charlotte
- Cape Constance
- Cape Darnley
- Cape Demidov
- Cape Disappointment
- Ducloz Head
- Factory Point
- Framnaes Point
- Gold Head
- Greene Peninsula
- Hansen Point
- Harbour Point
- Cape Harcourt
- Harrison Point
- Hercules Point
- Holmestrand
- Johnson Point
- Kade Point
- Kanin Point
- Kelp Point
- King Edward Point
- Klutschak Point
- Köppen Point
- Leon Head
- Low Rock Point
- Matthews Point
- Morse Point
- Müller Point
- Cape North
- Cape Nuñez
- Cape Paryadin
- Pig Point
- Pirner Point
- Point Purvis
- Restitution Point
- Romerof Head
- Cape Rosa
- Rumbolds Point
- Thatcher Peninsula
- Tønsberg Point
- Cape Vahsel
- Cape Vakop
- Wales Head
- Weddell Point
- Will Point

=== Miscellaneous ===
- Bonner Beach
- Hestesletten
- Lönnberg Valley
- Papua Beach
- Salisbury Plain
- Sörling Valley
- Survey Isthmus

=== Mountains and hills ===
- Admiralty Peak
- Allardyce Range
- Mount Antell
- Mount Ashley
- Atherton Peak
- Mount Back
- Mount Barren
- Mount Baume
- Best Peak
- Binary Peaks
- Binnie Peaks
- Blechnum Peaks
- Bomford Peak
- Brocken
- Mount Brooker
- Mount Burley
- Mount Carse
- Mount Clara
- Coffin Top
- Copestake Peak
- Mount Corneliussen
- Cornwall Peaks
- Coronda Peak
- Mount Cunningham
- Dixon Peak
- Mount Dow
- Ellerbeck Peak
- Mount Fagan
- Mount Fagerli
- Ferguson Peak
- Fortuna Peak
- Foxtail Peak
- Mount Fraser
- Fusilier Mountain
- Gazella Peak
- Mount Globus
- Mount Grant (South Georgia)
- Harper Peak
- Hay Peak
- Headland Peak
- Hesse Peak
- Jason Peak
- Justa Peak
- Mount Kling
- Mount Krokisius
- Larssen Peak
- Larvik Cone
- McIlroy Peak
- Mount Macklin
- Mount Mair
- Marikoppa
- Mills Peak
- Murphy Wall
- Nachtigal Peak
- Neighbour Peak
- Nordenskjöld Peak
- Mount Normann
- Orca Peak
- Mount Paget
- Mount Paterson
- Paulsen Peak
- Petrel Peak
- Pirner Peak
- Pyramid Peak
- Mount Regulator
- Roché Peak
- Mount Roots
- Ruby Peak
- Mount Sabatier
- Salvesen Range
- Mount Senderens
- Sheridan Peak
- Mount Skittle
- Slossarczyk Crag
- Smillie Peak
- Sørlle Buttress
- Mount Spaaman
- Stanley Peak, South Georgia
- Starbuck Peak
- Stejneger Peak
- Stenhouse Peak
- Mount Sugartop
- Swinhoe Peak
- Three Brothers
- Treble Peak
- Trendall Crag
- The Trident
- Vogel Peak
- Warburton Peak
- Wilckens Peaks
- Mount Woodward
- Mount Worsley

=== Rock formations ===
- Andrews Rocks
- Anvil Stacks
- Bar Rocks
- Bucentaur Rock
- Camana Rock
- Contrast Rocks
- Cordall Stacks
- Discovery Rock
- Ems Rock
- Fantome Rock
- First Rock
- High Rock
- Middle Ground Rock
- Olsen Rock
- Seaward Rock
- Sky Rock
- Theodor Rock
- Waring Rocks
