= List of glaciers of South Georgia =

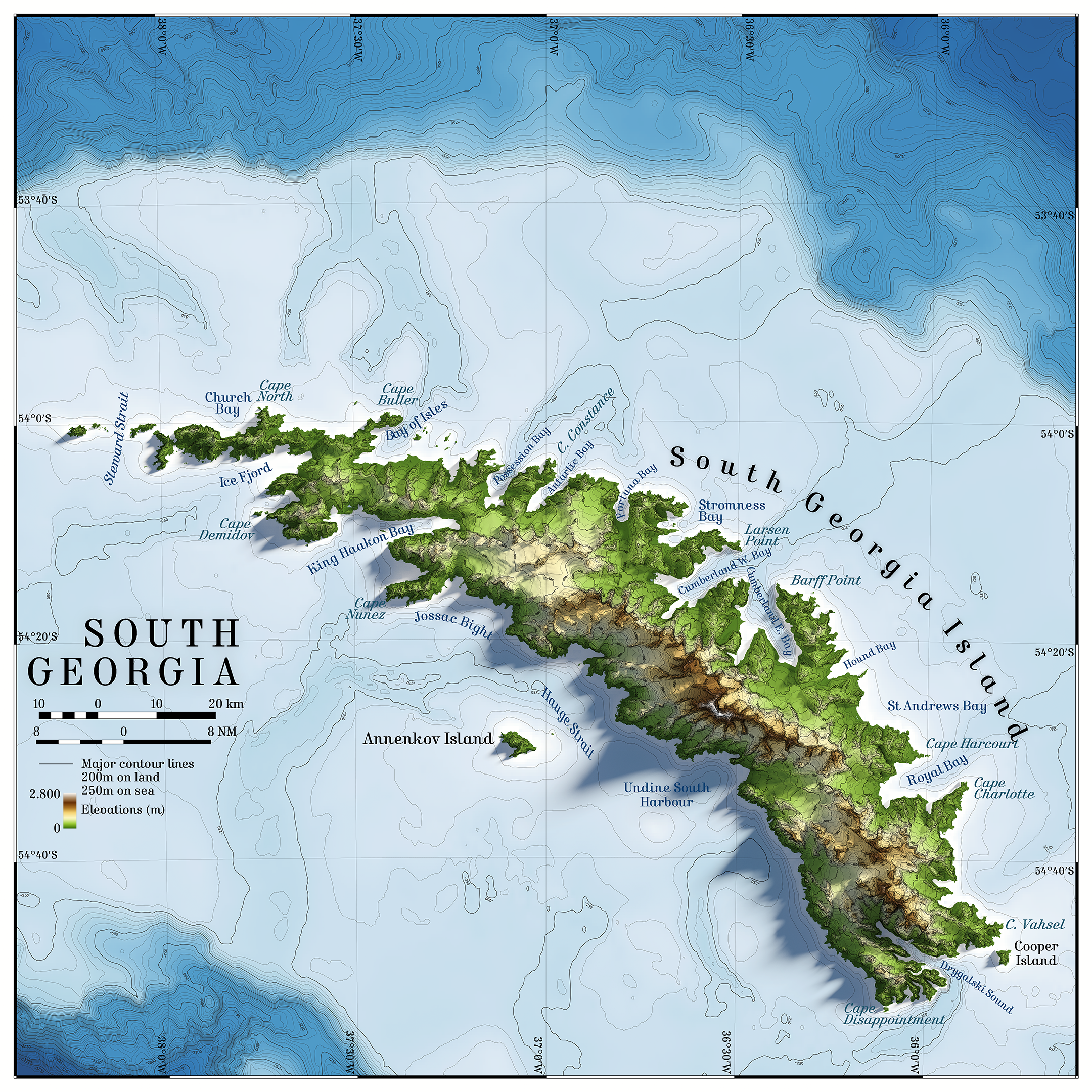
Topographic map of the Island of South Georgia

Following is a list of glaciers of South Georgia in Antarctica. This list may not reflect recently named glaciers in South Georgia.

- Austin Glacier
- Bary Glacier
- Bertrab Glacier
- Bogen Glacier
- Briggs Glacier
- Brøgger Glacier
- Brunonia Glacier
- Buxton Glacier
- Christensen Glacier
- Christophersen Glacier
- Clayton Glacier
- Cook Glacier
- Crean Glacier
- Dead End Glacier
- Eclipse Glacier
- Esmark Glacier
- Fortuna Glacier
- Geikie Glacier
- Graae Glacier
- Grace Glacier
- Hamberg Glacier
- Harker Glacier
- Harmer Glacier
- Heaney Glacier
- Helland Glacier
- Henningsen Glacier
- Herz Glacier
- Hindle Glacier
- Hodges Glacier
- Jenkins Glacier
- Jewell Glacier
- Keilhau Glacier
- Kjerulf Glacier
- König Glacier
- Lancing Glacier
- Lewald Glacier
- Lucas Glacier
- Lyell Glacier
- Morris Glacier
- Nachtigal Glacier
- Neumayer Glacier
- Nordenskjöld Glacier
- Novosilski Glacier
- Paget Glacier
- Peters Glacier
- Philippi Glacier
- Price Glacier
- Purvis Glacier
- Quensel Glacier
- Risting Glacier
- Ross Glacier
- Ryan Glacier
- Salomon Glacier
- Schrader Glacier
- Spenceley Glacier
- Storey Glacier
- Twitcher Glacier
- Tyrrell Glacier
- Webb Glacier
- Weddell Glacier
- Wheeler Glacier
