= Ruby Peak =

Ruby Peak may refer to:

- Ruby Peak (South Georgia Island)
- Ruby Peak (California)
- A peak in the Ruby Range, Montana

== See also ==
- Ruby Dome, a mountain in Nevada
- Ruby Mountain, in California
