= Binary Peaks =

Mountains in South Georgia

Coordinates: 54°29′S 36°5′W

Binary Peaks is a steep pinnacle covered with snow with two snow-free and therefore conspicuous summits, situated 1.5 nautical miles (3 km) northwest of Mount Krokisius and 2 nautical miles (4 km) north-northwest of Moltke Harbor, South Georgia. This feature was named "Doppelspitz" (double peaks) by a German expedition under K. Schrader, 1882–83, and was identified by the British Combined Services Expedition of 1964–65. An English form of the name, Binary Peaks, was recommended by the UK Antarctic Place-Names Committee in 1971.
