= Weddell Glacier =

Glacier in Antarctica

- Location within South Georgia Island
- Location: South Georgia
- Coordinates: 54°35′S 36°0′W
- Length: 2 nmi (4 km; 2 mi)
- Thickness: unknown
- Terminus: Royal Bay
- Status: unknown

Weddell Glacier (54°35′S 36°0′W) is a glacier 2 nautical miles (3.7 km) long on the north side of South Georgia, flowing north into Royal Bay between Will Point and Cape Charlotte. First mapped by the German group of the International Polar Year Investigations, 1882–83, and named for James Weddell, Master, Royal Navy, who as a sealing captain visited South Georgia in 1823.

== See also ==
- List of glaciers in the Antarctic
- Glaciology
