= First Rock =

First Rock (54°55′S 36°7′W) is a rock lying 1 nautical mile (2 km) south-southeast of Brøde Island and 2 nautical miles (4 km) south of Cape Disappointment, the southern extremity of South Georgia. It is the first (southernmost) in a line of three insular features south of Cape Disappointment discovered in 1775 by Captain James Cook. It was named because of its position by Discovery Investigations personnel who charted South Georgia in the period 1926–30.
