= Thatcher Peninsula =

Landform on South Georgia in the south Atlantic

Location of Thatcher Peninsula

Thatcher Peninsula within South Georgia

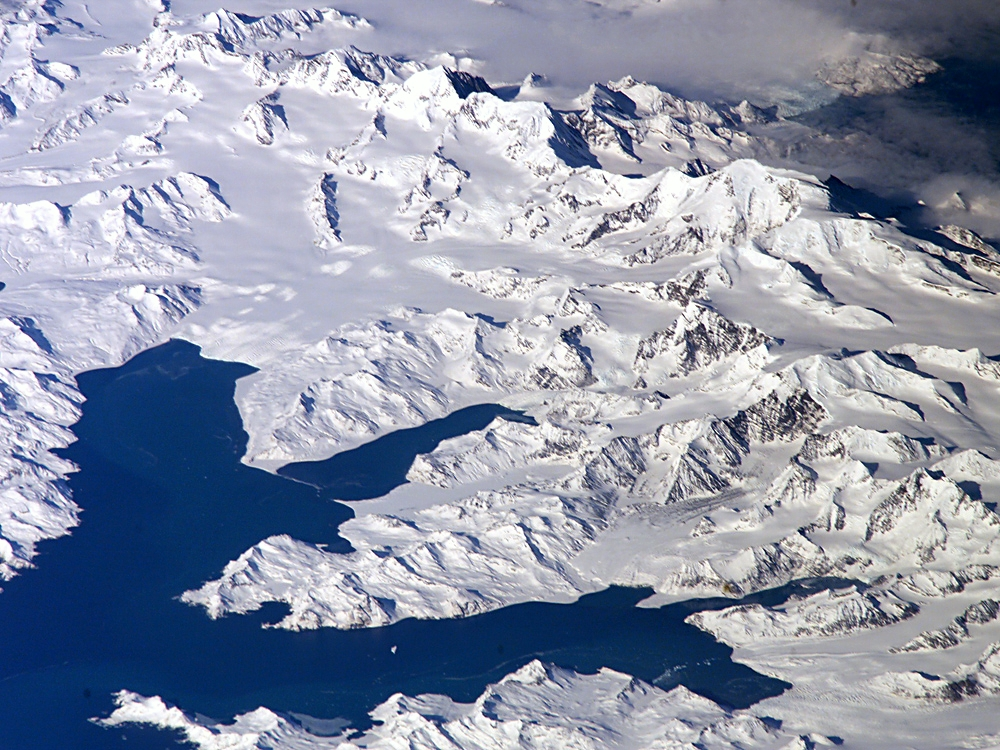
Central South Georgia: Cumberland Bay; Thatcher Peninsula with King Edward Cove (Grytviken) in the lower center; Allardyce Range with the summit Mt. Paget (NASA imagery).

Thatcher Peninsula (54°17′S 36°32′W) is a mountainous peninsula in north-central South Georgia. Its total area is approximately 5,640 hectares (13,900 acres), with roughly 1,620 ha (4,000 acres) covered in vegetation. It terminates to the north in Mai Point, rising between Cumberland West Bay to the west, and Cumberland East Bay and Moraine Fjord to the east. It is bounded to the southwest and south by Lyell Glacier and Hamberg Glacier. King Edward Cove on the east side of the peninsula is the site of the British Antarctic Survey (BAS) Grytviken station and the disused whaling station of the same name.

Thatcher Peninsula was named by the United Kingdom Antarctic Place-Names Committee (UK-APC) in 1991, at the suggestion of members of the Royal Geographical Society, after Margaret Thatcher, British prime minister, 1979–90. She was described by Sir Vivian Fuchs, chair of the Foreign Office's Antarctic Place Names Committee, as 'a major figure in the history of South Georgia', for her role in the Falklands War. Thatcher was, according to friends, "flattered and amused" by the honour.

== Geography ==
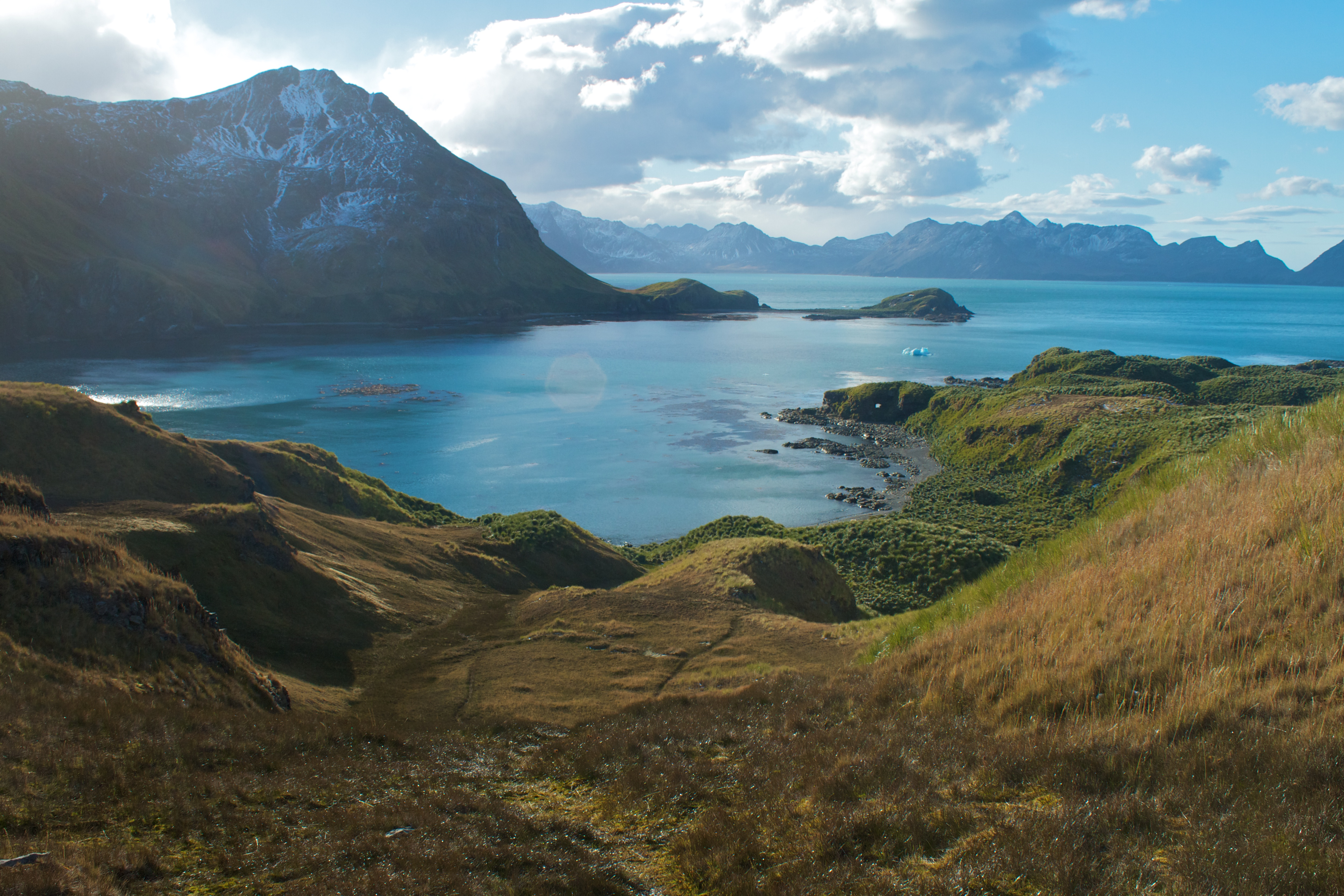
Maiviken

Many features on the coast of the peninsula have been individually charted and named. Features on the west coast are detailed as part of Cumberland West Bay, and those on the east coast are detailed as part of Cumberland East Bay.

=== Northern coast ===
The most prominent feature on the northern coast of the peninsula is Maiviken, a small cove. Maiviken and its surrounding features were first charted by the Swedish Antarctic Expedition (SAE), 1901–04, under Otto Nordenskjold. Maiviken was first entered on May Day, 1902, and was therefore named "Majviken" (May Cove). Over the years, the Norwegian spelling Maiviken has become established for the cove.

Poa Cove is a smaller cove that indents the southeast corner of Maiviken. Burnet Cove indents the northeastern coast of Maiviken, southwest of Mai Point. Close south of Mai Point is Tortula Cove. These three smaller coves were resurveyed by Discovery Investigations (DI) personnel in 1929 and the Falkland Islands Dependencies Survey (FIDS) in 1951. All three were named by UK-APC for plant genera common in their vicinity; Poa for the grass genus Poa, Burnet for the common name of genus Acaena, and Tortula for the moss genus Tortula. Mai Point marks the eastern side of Maiviken, as well as the northernmost extent of the peninsula as a whole. Its name was given by SAE personnel in association with Maiviken.

East of Mai Point, Sappho Point marks the west side of the entrance to Cumberland East Bay, on the north coast of South Georgia. Probably first sighted by the 1775 British expedition under Captain James Cook which explored the north coast of South Georgia. Named for HMS Sappho, a British ship used in charting portions of Cumberland Bay in 1906.

=== Inland features ===
On the northern portion of the peninsula, Camp Peak rises to about 1,080 ft (330 m) on the west side of Maiviken. It was charted by DI in 1929 and so named because a camp was established on the shore below the peak.

Spencer Peak rises to 1,457 ft (444 m) tall southwest of Sappho Point. The name appears to be first used on a 1906 British Admiralty chart and is probably for Lieutenant P. Spencer, who surveyed in Cumberland Bay from HMS Sappho in 1906. Northwest of Spencer Peak, the valley Maidalen runs north-south down to Lewis Pass. Mount Duse stands 505 metres (1,660 ft) high, approximately 0.86 nmi (1.6 km) south of Spencer Peak surmounting King Edward Point. It was charted in 1902 by Lieutenant S.A. Duse, cartographer of the SAE, for whom it is named. Mount Hodges stands 605 metres (1,985 ft) high, 1 nmi (2 km) west of Mount Duse. It first appears as "Moldaenke Berg" on a 1907 map by A. Szielasko, but this name was supplanted by "Mount Hodges", which appears to have been applied some years later and is now well established. It was probably named for Captain M.H. Hodges, Royal Navy, of the Sappho, who visited and mapped portions of Cumberland Bay in 1906.

Several freshwater lakes and ponds are located along the east and southeast shores of Maiviken, all named by UK-APC. Løken Pond is the northernmost of these, found east of Burnet Cove. It was named after Reverend Kristen Løken, a Norwegian Lutheran minister from Lillehammer, the first appointed pastor of South Georgia. Arch Pond, named for a nearby natural arch, lies slightly south, between Burnet and Poa coves. East of Arch Pond is shallow Humic Lake, named for the dark-stained water caused by humic acid derived from the leaching of decaying peat on nearby slopes. Southernmost of this small group is Evans Lake, a comparatively deep lake of irregular shape named after John C. Ellis-Evans, a BAS biologist.

South of the head of Maiviken is the lake Maivatn. It is the largest, and at 39 metres (128 ft) deep, also the deepest of the small freshwater lakes in the Maiviken area. The lake was named Maivatn (May lake) in association with Maiviken. Tiny Lancetes Lake is found to the southwest of it.

== Wildlife ==
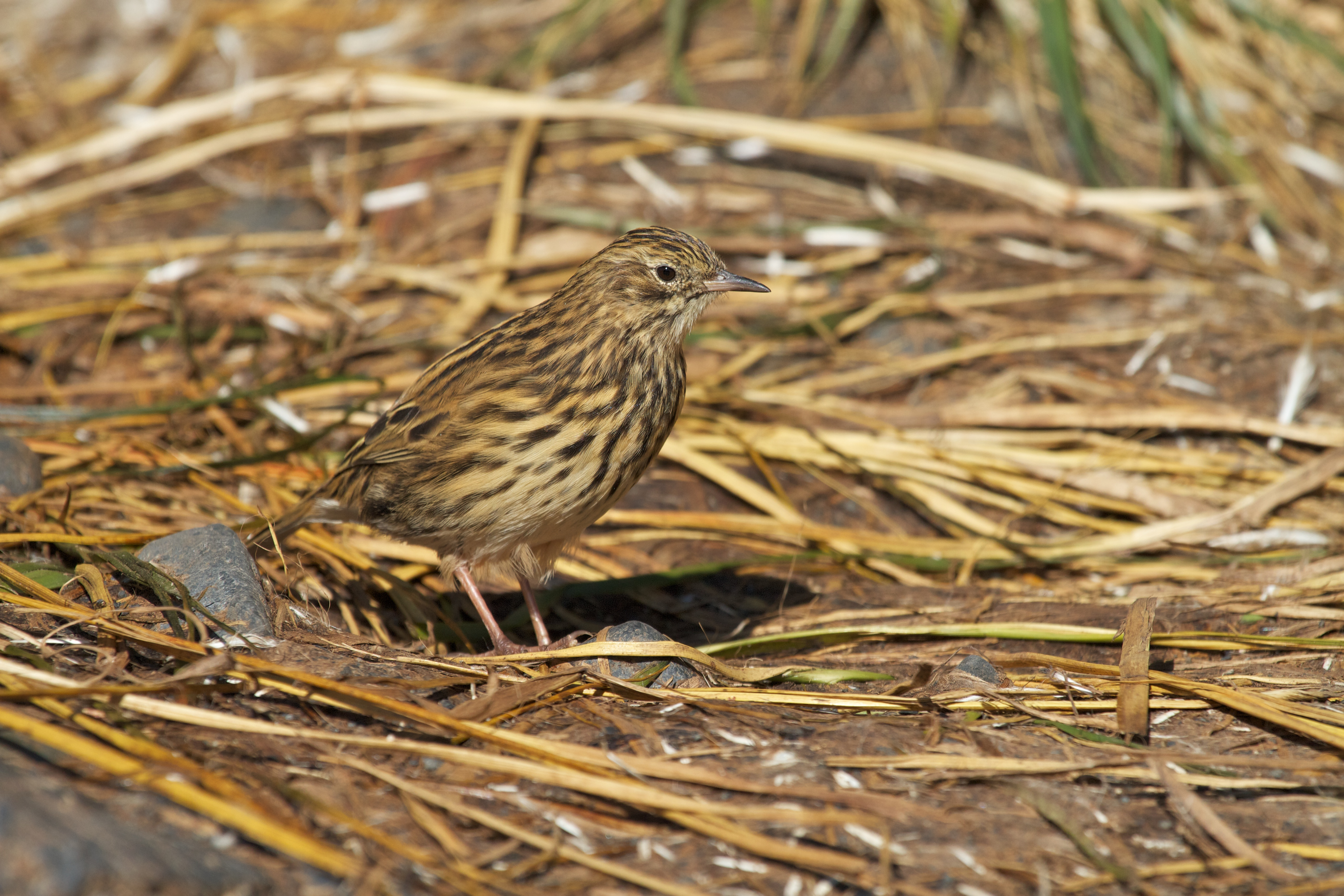
A South Georgia pipit on South Georgia island.

Lancetes Lake has a rich benthic flora of algae and mosses, which support a large population of the only water beetle seen in the sub-Antarctic, Lancetes clausii, from which the feature takes its name.

Brown rats are considered an invasive species on Thatcher Peninsula. They threaten the survival of native species such as the South Georgia pipit. From approximately 2011 to 2014, the government of South Georgia and the South Sandwich Islands undertook efforts to eradicate them by air-dropping brodifacoum pellets. Follow-up monitoring a year after the project indicated that the eradication had been a success, with little evidence of rats found.
