= Harbour Point =

Point in Stromness Bay, South Georgia

Coordinates: 54°9′S 36°41′W

Harbour Point is a point separating Leith Harbour and Stromness Harbour, in Stromness Bay, South Georgia. This descriptive name was in use as early as 1920 and was probably applied by whalers operating from Stromness Bay.
