= Paulsen Peak =

Mountain in South Georgia

Paulsen Peak (54°20′S 36°40′W) is a rock peak, 1,875 m, standing near the head of Lyell Glacier, 2 miles (3.2 km) northwest of Mount Sugartop in the Allardyce Range of South Georgia. Named by the United Kingdom Antarctic Place-Names Committee (UK-APC), following mapping by the SGS, 1951–52, for Harald B. Paulsen (1898–1951), a leading figure in the Norwegian whaling industry.
