= Greene Inlet =

Greene Inlet (54°3′S 38°1′W) is an inlet immediately northwest of Cape Paryadin at the west end of South Georgia. The name "Deep Inlet" was probably given by Lieutenant Commander J.M. Chaplin, Royal Navy, of the Discovery, during his survey of the Undine Harbour area in 1926 but it is not used locally. The South Georgia Survey, 1951–52, reported that the feature requires a name, but that Deep Inlet is not sufficiently distinctive, being descriptive of so many features at South Georgia. Greene Inlet is named for Daniel Greene of New Haven, CT, who in 1790 commanded one of the first two American sealing vessels to visit South Georgia.
