= Discovery Rock =

Discovery Rock (54°9′S 36°35′W) is a submerged rock in Stromness Bay, South Georgia, lying 0.7 nautical miles (1.3 km) north-northeast of Ems Rock. The rock was positioned by Discovery Investigations personnel under Lieutenant Commander J.M. Chaplin, Royal Navy, who made surveys of Stromness Bay in 1927 and 1929. They probably applied the name, which is now well established in local use.
