= Headland Peak =

Mountain in South Georgia

Headland Peak (54°16′S 36°43′W) is a peak rising to 875 metres (2,870 ft) on the north side of Geikie Glacier, at the head of Cumberland West Bay, South Georgia. It was named by the UK Antarctic Place-Names Committee for Robert K. Headland, a British Antarctic Survey biological assistant at Grytviken, 1977–80 and 1981–82. He was curator of the Scott Polar Research Institute from 1987.
