= Antell =

Antell may refer to:

== People ==
- Calum Antell (born 1992), Welsh footballer
- Kasten Antell (1845–1906), Finnish politician

== Other uses ==
- Mount Antell, a mountain in South Georgia
