= Olsen Valley =

Valley in South Georgia

Olsen Valley (54°12′S 36°41′W) is a valley extending from Husvik Harbor in Stromness Bay to Carlita Bay in Cumberland West Bay, on the north side of South Georgia. The feature was known to early whalers and sealers at South Georgia. It was surveyed by the SGS in the period 1951–57, and named by the United Kingdom Antarctic Place-Names Committee (UK-APC) for Nils E. Olsen, Manager of Tonsberg Hvalfangeri, Husvik, 1950–56.
