= First Milestone =

First Milestone (54°6′S 36°40′W) is a rock marked by breakers, 2 nautical miles (4 km) northwest of Cape Saunders, off the north coast of South Georgia. It was charted and named by Discovery Investigations personnel on the Discovery during the period 1926–30.
