= Middle Ground Rock =

Submerged rock near South Georgia island

Middle Ground Rock (54°8′S 36°36′W) is a submerged kelp-covered rock lying 1.5 nautical miles (3 km) east of Framnaes Point, in the middle of the entrance of Stromness Bay, South Georgia in the South Atlantic Ocean. The name appears to be first used on a 1952 British Admiralty chart.
