= Mount Senderens =

Mountain in South Georgia

Mount Senderens (54°50′S 36°7′W) is a mountain, 1,315 m, standing close south of Mount Sabatier and 1 nautical mile (1.9 km) north of Rogged Bay at the south end of South Georgia. The feature appears on charts dating back to the 1930s. It was surveyed by the South Georgia Survey in the period 1951–57, and named by the United Kingdom Antarctic Place-Names Committee (UK-APC) for Jean-Baptiste Senderens (1856–1937), French chemist, whose work with Paul Sabatier led to the introduction in about 1907 of the hydrogenation process for hardening whale oil.
