= Waring Rocks =

Maritime landmark off South Georgia

Waring Rocks (54°4′S 38°1′W) is a two pointed rocks lying off the west end of South Georgia, 0.6 nautical miles (1.1 km) southwest of Cape Paryadin. Charted by DI personnel on the 1963 for Leading Seaman Thomas J. Waring of HMS Owen, which surveyed this area in 1961.
