= Mount Burley =

Large landmass on South Georgia island

Mount Burley (54°29′S 36°9′W) is a peak, 895 metres (2,940 ft) high, located 2 nautical miles (4 km) southwest of Doris Bay, South Georgia. It was named by the UK Antarctic Place-Names Committee for Lieutenant Commander Malcolm K. Burley, Royal Navy, leader of the British Combined Services Expedition which surveyed this vicinity in 1964–65.
