= Lyell Lake =

Lyell Lake (54°19′S 36°35′W) is a lake on the east side of Lyell Glacier, South Georgia. The moraine-dammed lake has a series of terraces above the current shoreline, marking former lake levels. It was named by the UK Antarctic Place-Names Committee in 1991 in association with Lyell Glacier.
