= Will Point =

Will Point (54°33′S 36°1′W) is a point at the head of Royal Bay, lying 4 nautical miles (7 km) west of Cape Charlotte on the north coast of South Georgia. First mapped by the German group of the International Polar Year Investigations, 1882–83. Resurveyed by the SGS in the period 1951–57 and named by the United Kingdom Antarctic Place-Names Committee (UK-APC) for Dr. H. Will, botanist with the German expedition which wintered at Royal Bay in 1882–83.
