= Cornwall Peaks =

The Cornwall Peaks (54°11′S 36°52′W) are two conspicuous rock peaks, the higher reaching 960 metres (3,150 ft), standing at the west side of König Glacier, 2.5 nautical miles (5 km) southwest of Fortuna Bay, South Georgia. The name Cornwall Peak was probably given by Discovery Investigations personnel during their survey of Fortuna Bay in 1929. During the South Georgia Survey, 1951–52, this peak could not be re-identified. At the same time it was reported that the features now described, although lying farther south, together form a conspicuous landmark requiring a name. The name Cornwall Peaks was recommended for these peaks by the UK Antarctic Place-Names Committee in 1954, and the name "Cornwall Peak" (singular) has been eliminated.
