= Mount Baume =

Mountain in South Georgia

Mount Baume (54°39′S 36°13′W) is a mountain, 1,910 metres (6,270 ft) high, rising midway along the north flank of Novosilski Glacier near the southeast end of South Georgia. It was surveyed by the South Georgia Survey (SGS) in the period 1951–57 and named for Louis C. Baume, a member of the SGS in 1955–56. The first ascent was made on 27 September 2016 by Caradoc Jones, Skip Novak, Simon Richardson and Stephen Venables.
