= Restitution Point =

Restitution Point (54°4′S 37°9′W) is a point marking the north side of the entrance to South Bay in Prince Olav Harbor, on the north coast of South Georgia. The name Factory Point, derived from the nearby whaling station (now no longer operating), was given for this feature by DI personnel in 1929. There is also a Factory Point at Leith Harbor, less than 20 nautical miles (37 km) to the NW. Since Factory Point in Leith Harbor is better known locally, it has been retained. To avoid confusion the name Factory Point is rejected for the feature now described, and a new name Restitution Point is approved. The S.S. years at Prince Olav Harbor before the shore station was built there.
