= Mount Dow =

Mountain in South Georgia

Mount Dow (54°42′S 36°10′W) is a mountain, 1,680 metres (5,510 ft) high, standing at the south side of Novosilski Glacier, 1 nautical mile (2 km) west of the north end of Mount Carse in the south part of South Georgia. It was surveyed by the South Georgia Survey in the period 1951–57, and was named by the UK Antarctic Place-Names Committee for American whaling historian George F. Dow, the author of Whale Ships and Whaling: A Pictorial History of Whaling During Three Centuries.
