= Ems Rock =

Ems Rock (54°10′S 36°35′W) is a rock midway between Harrison Point and Busen Point in the south part of Stromness Bay, South Georgia. It was charted by Discovery Investigations personnel under Lieutenant Commander J.M. Chaplin in 1927 and 1929, and was named in 1957 by the UK Antarctic Place-Names Committee for the sailing vessel Ems, owned by the Tonsberg Hvalfangeri, Husvik, located at the head of Husvik Harbour in Stromness Bay.
