= Brøde Island =

Island in Antarctica

Brøde Island (54°54′S 36°7′W) is a small, rounded tussock-covered island, 1 nautical mile (2 km) southwest of Green Island, off the southern tip of South Georgia. It was first charted in 1775 by a British expedition under James Cook; it was roughly surveyed by a German expedition, 1928–29, under Kohl-Larsen, who appears to have used the name "Hauptinsel" (head island) for this feature. Following a survey in 1951–52, the South Georgia Survey reported that the name Brøde (Norwegian word meaning "loaf") is firmly established among whalers and sealers for this island and the name is approved on this basis.

== See also ==
- List of Antarctic and sub-Antarctic islands
