= Kelp Point =

Kelp Point (54°10′S 36°38′W) is a point fringed by kelp, marking the south side of the entrance to Husvik Harbor, the southern arm of Stromness Bay, on the north coast of South Georgia. It was charted and named by Discovery Investigations personnel in the period 1926–30.
