= Mount Back =

Peak on South Georgia Island in the Antarctic

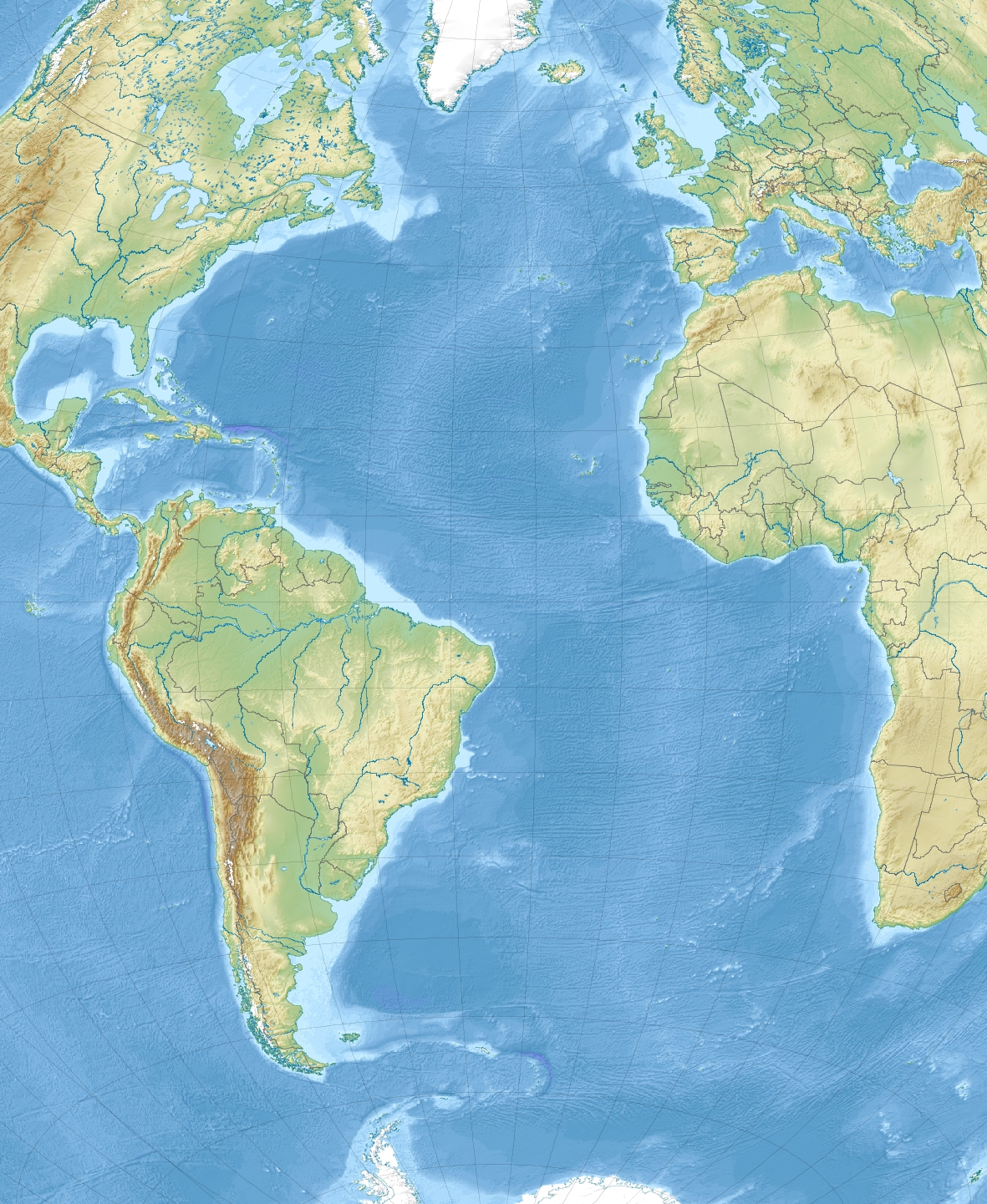
- Location within Atlantic Ocean

Highest point
- Elevation: 650 m (2,130 ft)

Naming
- Etymology: Anthony H. Back, surveyor with the British Combined Services Expedition

Geography
- Continent: Antarctica
- Area: South Georgia Island
- Range coordinates: 54°29′S 36°7′W

Mount Back (54°29′S 36°7′W) is a peak, 650 metres (2,130 ft) high, located 1.5 nautical miles (3 km) south of Doris Bay, on the South Atlantic island of South Georgia.

It was named by the UK Antarctic Place-Names Committee for Squadron Leader Anthony H. Back, Royal Air Force, assistant surveyor with the British Combined Services Expedition of 1964–65, who assisted in the survey of this peak.
