= Swinhoe Peak =

Mountain in South Georgia

Swinhoe Peak (54°20′S 36°32′W) is a peak, 845 m (2,772 ft) high, standing between Hamberg Glacier and Hestesletten on the north side of South Georgia. The peak was mapped by the Swedish Antarctic Expedition, 1901–03, under Nordenskjold. It was surveyed by the South Georgia Survey in the period 1951–57. Named by the United Kingdom Antarctic Place-Names Committee (UK-APC) for Ernest Swinhoe, Manager of the South Georgia Exploration Co., who visited South Georgia in 1905 to prospect for minerals and to consider the establishment of an experimental sheep ranch.
