= Ruby Peak (South Georgia Island) =

Mountain in South Georgia

Ruby Peak (54°12′S 36°40′W) is a peak rising on the east side of Olsen Valley to the southwest of Jason Peak, South Georgia. The name appears to be first used on a 1930 British Admiralty chart.
