= Foxtail Peak =

Mountain in South Georgia

Foxtail Peak (54°14′S 36°42′W) is a peak, 455 metres (1,500 ft) high, on the north side of Neumayer Glacier, 2 nautical miles (4 km) west of Carlita Bay, South Georgia. It was charted by the Swedish Antarctic Expedition, 1901–04, under Otto Nordenskiöld. It was surveyed by the South Georgia Survey in the period 1951–56 and named by the UK Antarctic Place-Names Committee after the Antarctic foxtail grass slopes of the peak.
