= Nachtigal Glacier =

Glacier in Antarctica

- Location within South Georgia Island
- Location: South Georgia
- Coordinates: 54°29′S 36°9′W
- Length: 2 nmi (4 km; 2 mi)
- Thickness: unknown
- Terminus: Doris Bay
- Status: unknown

Nachtigal Glacier is a glacier 2 nautical miles (3.7 km) long flowing north from Mount Fagan toward Doris Bay, South Georgia. Charted by the German group of the International Polar Year Investigations, 1882–83, who named the glacier after Dr. Gustav Nachtigal (1834–85), German physician and explorer of Africa.

== See also ==
- List of glaciers in the Antarctic
- Glaciology
