= Pirner Peak =

Mountain in South Georgia

Pirner Peak (54°31′S 36°4′W) is a peak 0.7 nautical miles (1.3 km) northwest of Pirner Point, Royal Bay, South Georgia. Surveyed by the German group of the International Polar Year Investigations, 1882–83, and named by them for Captain Pirner of the expedition ship Moltke.

== See also ==
- Neighbour Peak
