= Neighbour Peak =

Mountain in South Georgia

Neighbour Peak (54°31′S 36°6′W) is a peak rising 1 nautical mile (1.9 km) west of Pirner Peak at Royal Bay, South Georgia. The British Combined Services Expedition, 1964–65, identified this feature as "Nachbar" (meaning neighbor), the name used by the German expedition under Schrader, 1882–83. The United Kingdom Antarctic Place-Names Committee (UK-APC) recommended in 1971 that "Nachbar" be used in the English form Neighbour and the descriptive term peak be added to it.
