= Coffin Top =

Coffin Top (54°30′S 36°6′W) is a mountain with a flattened summit, 745 metres (2,440 ft) high, located 1.4 nautical miles (2.6 km) east-northeast of Mount Fagan and 1.6 nautical miles (3 km) northwest of Moltke Harbour, South Georgia. The feature was named "Sarg-Berg" (coffin mountain) by the German group of the International Polar Year Expedition, 1882–83. An English form of the name, Coffin Top, was recommended by UK Antarctic Place-Names Committee in 1954.
