= Kelp Bay =

Bay in South Georgia

Kelp Bay (54°27′S 36°7′W) is a small open bay close east-southeast of Doris Bay on the north coast of South Georgia. It is filled with kelp and there is no anchorage. The South Georgia Survey, 1951–52, reported that the descriptive name was well established locally.
