= L. Harrison Matthews =

British zoologist (1901–1986)

Leonard Harrison Matthews
- Born: 12 June 1901
- Died: 27 November 1986 (aged 85)
- Scientific career
- Fields: marine zoology

Leonard Harrison Matthews FRS (12 June 1901 – 27 November 1986) was a British zoologist, especially known for his research and writings on marine mammals.

== Life ==
Matthews was born in Bristol, and attended Bristol Grammar School. He studied biological sciences at King's College, Cambridge, where he graduated with a first-class degree in 1922. He was involved with the British Colonial Office backed Discovery Investigations from 1924 to 1929, during which he was largely based on the subantarctic island of South Georgia studying the biology of whales and southern elephant seals. He then held an academic position at the University of Bristol. During the Second World War he worked on radio communications and radar. He served as scientific director of the Zoological Society of London from 1951 to 1966.

His younger brother was the physiologist Sir Bryan Harold Cabot Matthews CBE FRS and his uncle the chemical scientist Lt-Col Edward Frank Harrison, inventor of the first serviceable gas mask.

== Honours ==
- 1954 – Fellow of the Royal Society
- Harrison Point and Matthews Point in South Georgia are named after him

== Publications ==
As well as numerous scientific papers and reports, Matthews also authored several books about his experiences in South Georgia. His publications include:

- 1931 – South Georgia, the Empire's Sub-Antarctic Outpost. John Wright & Sons: Bristol.
- 1934 – The Marine Deposits of the Patagonian Continental Shelf. (Discovery Reports). Cambridge University Press.
- 1937 – The Humpback whale, Megaptera Nodosa, (Discovery reports). Cambridge University Press.
- 1938 – The Sei whale, Balaenoptera Borealis. (Discovery reports). Cambridge University Press.
- 1938 – Notes on the Southern Right whale, Eubalaena Australis. (Discovery reports). Cambridge University Press.
- 1938 – The Sperm whale, Physeter Catodon. (Discovery reports). Cambridge University Press.
- 1939 – Reproduction in the Spotted Hyena. Cambridge University Press, for the Royal Society.
- 1951 – Wandering Albatross: Adventures among the Albatrosses and Petrels in the Southern Ocean. London. Macgibbon & Kee, with Reinhardt & Evans: London.
- 1952 – The British Amphibia and Reptiles. (Field study books series). Methuen: London.
- 1952 – British mammals. (New Naturalist 21). Collins: London.
- 1952 – Sea Elephant: The Life and Death of the Elephant Seal. MacGibbon & Kee: London.
- 1956 – The sexual skin of the Gelada Baboon (Theropithecus gelada). Transactions of the Zoological Society of London.
- 1962 – History of Pharmacy in Britain. E. & S. Livingstone: Edinburgh.
- 1963 – The Senses of Animals. (With Maxwell Knight). Scientific Book Club: London.
- 1968 – The Whale. Allen & Unwin: London.
- 1969-1971 – The Life of Mammals. (2 vols). Weidenfeld & Nicolson: London.
- 1973 – Charles Waterton: Wanderings in South America. (Editor and Introduction). Oxford University Press: Oxford. ISBN 0-19-255405-0
- 1975 – Man and Wildlife. (Biology and Environment series). Croom Helm: London.
- 1977 – Penguin. Adventures among the Birds, Beasts and Whalers of the Far South. Peter Owen: London. ISBN 0-7206-0504-0
- 1978 – The Natural History of the Whale. Weidenfeld and Nicolson: London. ISBN 0-297-77443-3
- 1979 – The Seals and the Scientists. Peter Owen: London. ISBN 0-7206-0524-5
- 1982 – Mammals in the British Isles. (New Naturalist 68). Collins: London. ISBN 0-00-219738-3
