= Dixon Peak (South Georgia) =

Mountain in South Georgia

Dixon Peak (54°3′S 38°1′W) is a steep-sided peak rising to 420 metres (1,380 ft) at the southern end of Paryadin Ridge, 1 nautical mile (2 km) north of Cape Paryadin, South Georgia. It was roughly charted by Discovery Investigations personnel on the Discovery in the period 1926–30, and was named by the UK Antarctic Place-Names Committee in 1963 for Lieutenant John B. Dixon, Royal Navy, surveying officer on HMS Owen, which surveyed the area in 1960–61.
