= Mount Fagerli =

Mountain in South Georgia

Mount Fagerli (54°20′S 36°43′W) is a mountain rising to 1,880 metres (6,170 ft) in the Allardyce Range of South Georgia, standing 1 nautical mile (2 km) southwest of Marikoppa on the north side of Kjerulf Glacier. It was surveyed by the South Georgia Survey in the period 1951–57, and was named by the UK Antarctic Place-Names Committee for Soren Fagerli, Manager of the Compañía Argentina de Pesca station in Grytviken from 1938 to 1948.
