= Mount Antell =

Mountain in South Georgia

Mount Antell (54°7′S 36°42′W) is a mountain rising above 610 metres (2,000 ft), overlooking the north coast of South Georgia midway between Bjelland Point and Hercules Point. It was surveyed by the South Georgia Survey in the period 1951–57, and named by the UK Antarctic Place-Names Committee for Georg Antell, foreman of the South Georgia Whaling Company station at nearby Leith Harbour, 1913–39.
