= Harrison Point =

Cape in South Georgia and the South Sandwich Islands

Coordinates: 54°10′S 36°36′W

Harrison Point is a point marked by a string of off-lying rocks, lying 1.5 nautical miles (3 km) west of Busen Point on the south side of Stromness Bay on the island of South Georgia.

Harrison Point was first charted in 1927 by Discovery Investigations (DI) personnel and named "Matthews Point" for L. Harrison Matthews, a British zoologist and member of the DI staff, 1924–35, who worked at South Georgia in 1924–27. In 1954, the UK Antarctic Place-Names Committee recommended that this name be altered to Harrison Point to avoid duplication with Matthews Point (also named for L. Harrison Matthews), a better known feature in Undine Harbour, South Georgia. This change allows Matthews' name to be retained for this feature, while the confusing duplication of names is avoided.
