= Stenhouse Peak =

Mountain in South Georgia

Stenhouse Peak (54°15′S 36°33′W) is a peak, 525 m, standing 1 nautical mile (1.9 km) west of Maiviken, Cumberland Bay, on the north coast of South Georgia. The name appears to be first used on a 1929 British Admiralty chart.
