= Hercules Point =

Coordinates: 54°7′S 36°40′W

Hercules Point is a point forming the west side of the entrance to Hercules Bay on the north coast of South Georgia. It was probably first surveyed by Discovery Investigations personnel in 1927. The name, which derives from nearby Hercules Bay, was used by a German expedition under Ludwig Kohl-Larsen, 1928–29, but is known to have been used earlier by whalers.
