= Mount Fagan =

Mountain in South Georgia

Mount Fagan (54°30′S 36°8′W) is a mountain rising to 930 metres (3,050 ft) 1.4 nautical miles (2.6 km) west-southwest of Coffin Top and 2.75 nautical miles (5.1 km) west of Moltke Harbour, South Georgia. It was named by the UK Antarctic Place-Names Committee in 1971 for Captain P.F. Fagan, Royal Engineers, surveyor on the British Combined Services Expedition of 1964–65, and the first person to climb the mountain.
