= Harper Peak =

Mountain in South Georgia

Harper Peak (54°7′S 36°45′W) is a peak, 785 metres (2,575 ft) high, standing east of Fortuna Peak and Fortuna Bay on the north coast of South Georgia. The name appears to be first used on a 1931 British Admiralty chart.
