= Framnaes Point =

Headland in South Georgia

Framnaes Point (54°8′S 36°39′W) is a point 1 mile (2 km) southwest of Cape Saunders, on the north side of Stromness Bay, South Georgia. The name was given prior to 1920, probably by Norwegian whalers operating in the area.

Just 0.5 miles (0.80 km) southeast of Framnaes Point are a small group of rocks called the Black Rocks. The name Blenheim Rocks has appeared for these rocks, but since about 1930 the name Black Rocks has been used more consistently.
