= Mount Regulator =

Mountain in South Georgia

Mount Regulator (54°0′S 37°44′W) is a mountain, 655 m, standing 1 nautical mile (1.9 km) west of Right Whale Bay on the north side of South Georgia. Surveyed by the SGS in the period 1951–57, and named by the United Kingdom Antarctic Place-Names Committee (UK-APC) for the Regulator. The Regulator was an American sealing ship that was wrecked during the 1799–1800 season. The crew was rescued by an unknown British sealing ship. Captain Edmund Fanning of New York returned during the next season and found deserted shelters at Right Whale Bay, built by the crew of the Regulator before their rescue.
