= Stromness, South Georgia =

Coordinates: 54.16°S 36.7116°W

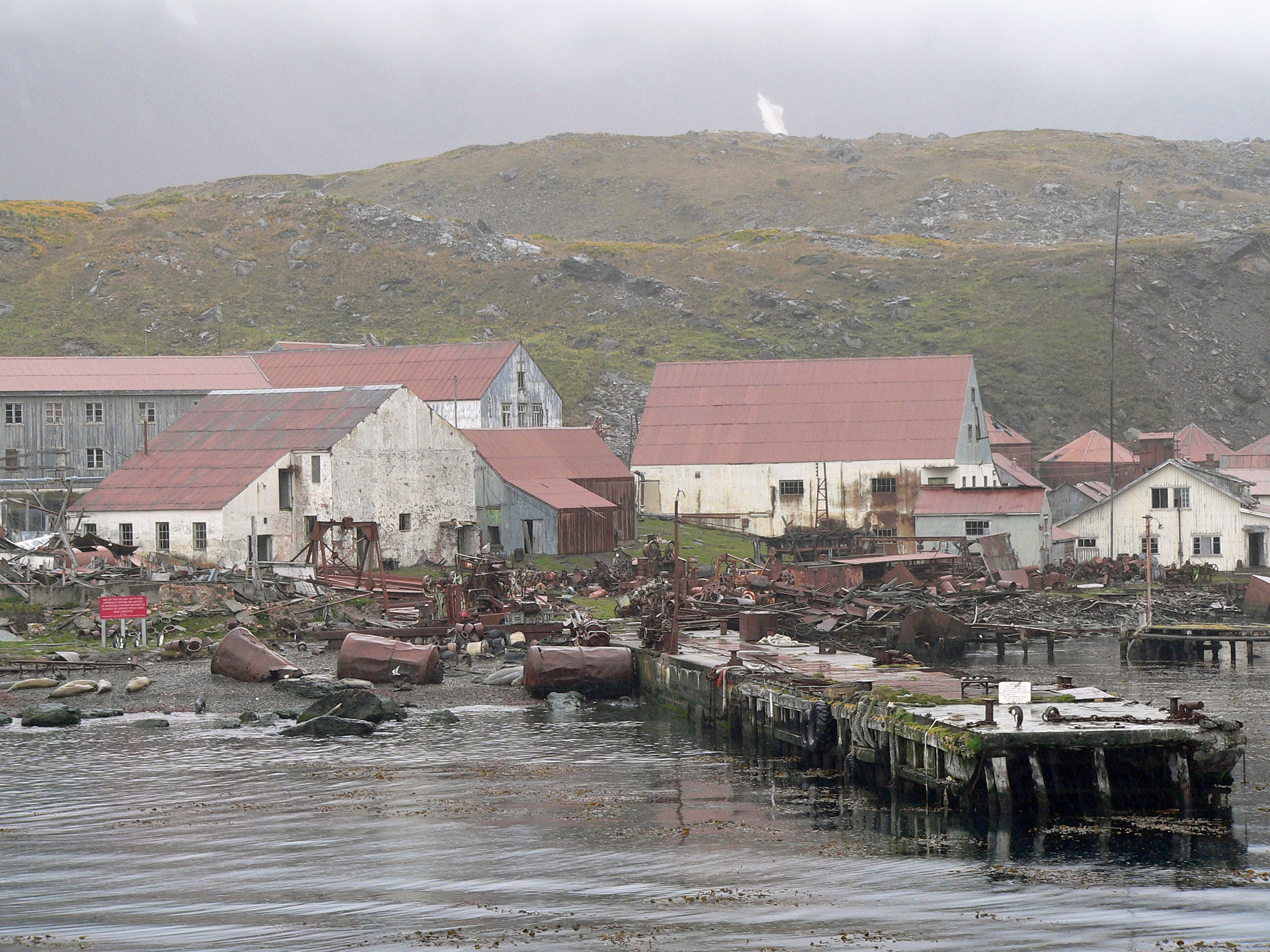
- Ruins of the whaling station at Leith
- Interactive map of Stromness, South Georgia

Stromness is an abandoned whaling station on the northern coast of South Georgia Island in the South Atlantic. It was the destination of Sir Ernest Shackleton's rescue journey in 1916. It is the central of three harbours in the west side of Stromness Bay, South Georgia.

The name "Fridtjof Nansen" or Nansen appeared for this harbour on some early charts, but since about 1920, the name Stromness has been consistently used. Its name, Stromness, derives from the similarly named town in the Orkney Islands, Scotland.

== History ==
In 1907, a "floating factory" was erected in Stromness Harbour; a land station was built in 1912. From 1912 until 1931, Stromness operated as a whaling station, the first manager of which was Thoralf Sørlle, who was manager every season (except 1917/18 and 1918/19) through to its closure as a whaling station in 1931. It was then converted into a ship repair yard with a machine shop and a foundry. It remained operational until 1961, when the site was abandoned.

In 1916, Ernest Shackleton and a small crew landed on the unpopulated southern coast of South Georgia at King Haakon Bay after an arduous sea voyage from Elephant Island in the 22-foot (6.7 m) lifeboat, James Caird. Shackleton, along with Tom Crean and Frank Worsley, then trekked across South Georgia's mountainous and glaciated interior in an effort to reach help on the populated northern shore of the island.

After 36 hours of crossing the interior, they arrived at Stromness and asked to see the manager and were taken to his dwelling. At each of the whaling stations on the island the managers dwelling is called the "Villa" because it represents relative luxury compared to its surroundings. All men were later rescued from Elephant Island.

In the decades following its closure, Stromness has been subject to damage from the elements and many of its buildings have been reduced to ruins. However, recent proposals have been made to restore the "Villa" and clean up debris from the rest of the site in order to make it safe for visitors. Outside of Stromness is a small whalers' cemetery with 14 grave markers.

== See also ==
- Stromness Bay
- Imperial Trans-Antarctic Expedition – 1914–17 British Expedition led by Sir Ernest Shackleton
