= Treble Peak =

Mountain in South Georgia

Treble Peak (54°7′S 36°45′W) is a peak with three summits rising to about 610 m, situated east of Fortuna Bay and 0.5 nautical miles (0.9 km) south of Mount Harper on the north coast of South Georgia. Charted and named descriptively by DI personnel in 1929.
