= Rogged Bay =

Rogged Bay (54°52′S 36°7′W) is a small bay lying immediately north of Cape Disappointment, the south tip of South Georgia. The name Rogged Bay, which was probably used by early sealers, was recorded by Arnaldo Faustini on a 1906 map and applied to a wider but less distinctive embayment in this vicinity. Following its survey in 1951–52, the SGS reported that the small bay immediately north of Cape Disappointment required a name. The existing name Rogged Bay was recommended, as limited to this small bay, by the United Kingdom Antarctic Place-Names Committee (UK-APC) in 1954.
