= Mount Sabatier =

Mountain in South Georgia

Mount Sabatier (54°49′S 36°8′W) is a mountain 1,145 m, standing close north of Mount Senderens and 1 mile (1.6 km) northeast of Paradise Beach in the south part of South Georgia. The feature appears on charts dating back to the 1930s. It was surveyed by the SGS in the period 1951–57, and named by the United Kingdom Antarctic Place-Names Committee (UK-APC) for Professor Paul Sabatier (1854–1941), French chemist, whose work with Jean-Baptiste Senderens led to the introduction in about 1907 of the hydrogenation process for hardening whale oil.
