= Contrast Rocks =

Group of rocks in Antarctica

The Contrast Rocks (54°4′S 36°57′W) are a small group of rocks 0.5 nautical miles (1 km) east of Antarctic Point, along the north coast of South Georgia. The group was charted and named in the period 1926–1930 by Discovery Investigations personnel.
