= Warburton Peak =

Mountain in South Georgia

Warburton Peak (54°5′S 37°34′W) is a peak, 1,090 m high, standing 3 miles (4.8 km) northeast of the head of Wilson Harbour in the west part of South Georgia. It was surveyed by the South Georgia Survey in the period 1951–57, and named for Keith Warburton, who served as medical officer of the SGS 1953–54 expedition but was invalided home soon after the expedition reached the island. He accompanied the SGS again in the 1955-56 campaign as second-in-command, medical officer and mountaineer.
