= Orca Peak =

Mountain in South Georgia

Orca Peak (54°16′S 36°32′W) is a peak, 395 m, standing west of Grytviken on the north coast of South Georgia. The name appears to be first used on a 1930 British Admiralty chart.
