= Papua Beach =

Beach in Antarctica

Papua Beach (54°15′S 36°34′W) is a beach 1.5 nautical miles (2.8 km) long on the southeast shore of Cumberland West Bay, South Georgia. The name derives from "Papua Cove," a now-obsolete name given to a minor recession of the shore of Papau Beach by the Swedish Antarctic Expedition under Nordenskjold (1901–04) after members of the expedition noticed a colony of gentoo penguins (Pygoscelis papua) there. The cove was called "Pinguinbucht" on a 1907 chart by A. Szielasko, and the form Penguin Bay appears on some later charts. Following this survey in 1951–52, the SGS reported that the beach now described, rather than the cove or bay, is the significant feature for which a name is required.
