= Antarctic Point =

Coordinates: 54°4′S 36°58′W

Antarctic Point is a headland which marks the west side of the entrance to Antarctic Bay on the north coast of South Georgia. It was charted in the period 1926–1930 by Discovery Investigations personnel, who named it after nearby Antarctic Bay.

== See also ==
- Contrast Rocks
