= Fusilier Mountain =

Mountain in South Georgia

Coordinates: 54°25′S 36°15′W

Fusilier Mountain is a mountain rising to 810 metres (2,660 ft) on the north side of Heaney Glacier, 2.7 nautical miles (5 km) west of Mount Skittle, on the north coast of South Georgia. The field name "Dome Mountain" was used by the South Georgia Survey, 1951–52. It was named by the UK Antarctic Place-Names Committee in 1991 after the Royal Regiment of Fusiliers, established in 1688, one of the oldest Regiments in the British Army. A detachment of the 3rd Battalion RRF, commanded by Captain PMD Harris RRF was stationed at Grytviken in the austral winter of 1988.
