= Mount Krokisius =

Mountain in South Georgia

Mount Krokisius (54°30′S 36°3′W) is a mountain 0.6 nautical miles (1.1 km) northeast of Moltke Harbor, South Georgia. Named by the German group of the International Polar Year Investigations, 1882–83, for Corvette Captain Ferdinand Krokisius, commander of the Marie, one of the two ships of the expedition.
