= Fortuna Peak =

Mountain in South Georgia

Fortuna Peak (54°7′S 36°47′W) is a peak, 385 metres (1,260 ft) high, standing at the east side of Fortuna Bay, on the north coast of South Georgia. The name appears to be first used on a 1931 British Admiralty chart, and is probably in association with Fortuna Bay.

== See also ==
- Harper Peak
