= Factory Point =

Cape in South Georgia

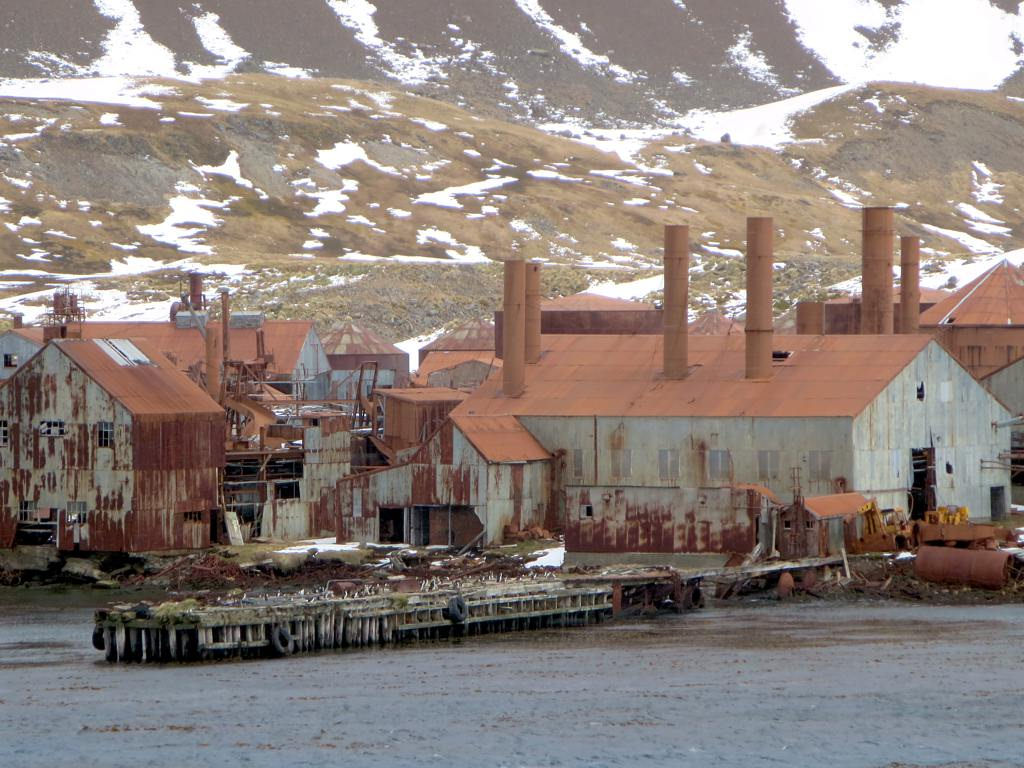
Abandoned whaling station at Leith Harbour

Factory Point (54°8′S 36°41′W) is a small point on the west side and close to the head of Leith Harbour, in Stromness Bay, South Georgia. The name was probably given by whalers because of its nearness to Messrs. Salvesen and Company's whaling station near the head of Leith Harbour.
