= Theodor Rock =

Coordinates: 54°36′S 37°1′W

Theodor Rock is a rock approximately midway between Annenkov Island and Pickersgill Islands, off the south coast of South Georgia. Charted by DI personnel in 1930 and named for Theodor Hansen, gunner on the Southern Pride, Norwegian whale catcher used in the survey.
