= Kjerulf Glacier =

Glacier in Antarctica

- Location within South Georgia Island
- Location: South Georgia
- Coordinates: 54°21′S 36°51′W
- Length: 7 nmi (13 km; 8 mi)
- Thickness: unknown
- Terminus: Newark Bay
- Status: unknown

Kjerulf Glacier, Norwegian: Kjerulfbreen, (54°21′S 36°51′W) is a glacier 7 nautical miles (13 km) long flowing west from Mount Sugartop to the east side of Newark Bay, on the south coast of South Georgia. It was mapped by Olaf Holtedahl during his visit to South Georgia in 1927–28, and named by him for Norwegian geologist Theodor Kjerulf, Professor of Mineralogy at the University of Christiania.

== See also ==
- List of glaciers in the Antarctic
- Glaciology
