= Storey Glacier =

Glacier in Antarctica

- Location within South Georgia Island
- Location: South Georgia
- Coordinates: 54°47′S 36°1′W
- Length: 6 nmi (11 km; 7 mi)
- Thickness: unknown
- Terminus: Drygalski Fjord
- Status: unknown

Storey Glacier (54°47′S 36°1′W) is a glacier on the northeast side of Drygalski Fjord at the southeast end of South Georgia. Named by the United Kingdom Antarctic Place-Names Committee (UK-APC) after Bryan C. Storey, British Antarctic Survey (BAS) geologist, 1974–79, who worked in the area, 1976–78.

== See also ==
- List of glaciers in the Antarctic
- Glaciology
