= Eclipse Glacier =

Glacier in Antarctica

- Location within South Georgia Island
- Location: South Georgia
- Coordinates: 54°23′S 36°50′W
- Thickness: unknown
- Terminus: Jacobsen Bight
- Status: unknown

Eclipse Glacier (54°23′S 36°50′W) is a glacier flowing southwest into the northern part of Jacobsen Bight on the south coast of South Georgia Island. It was so named by the British South Georgia Survey, 1954–55, led by George A. Sutton.

== See also ==
- List of glaciers in the Antarctic
- Glaciology
