= König Glacier =

Glacier in Antarctica

- Location within South Georgia Island
- Location: South Georgia
- Coordinates: 54°10′S 36°48′W
- Length: 3 nmi (6 km; 3 mi)
- Thickness: unknown
- Terminus: Fortuna Bay
- Status: unknown

König Glacier (54°10′S 36°48′W) is a glacier, 3 nautical miles (6 km) long and 1.5 nautical miles (3 km) wide, flowing in a northerly direction from the north side of Neumayer Glacier to the head of Fortuna Bay, South Georgia. It was first surveyed in 1928–29 by a German expedition under Kohl-Larsen, who named it for Austrian mountaineer Felix König, who took part in the Second German Antarctic Expedition, 1911–12, under Wilhelm Filchner.

== See also ==
- List of glaciers in the Antarctic
- Glaciology
