= Jason Peak =

Mountain in South Georgia

Jason Peak (54°11′S 36°37′W) is a peak, 675 metres (2,215 ft) high, lying 1 mile (1.6 km) west of Jason Harbour on the north coast of South Georgia. The name appears to be first used on a 1929 British Admiralty chart.
