= Cape Charlotte =

Cape on South Georgia island

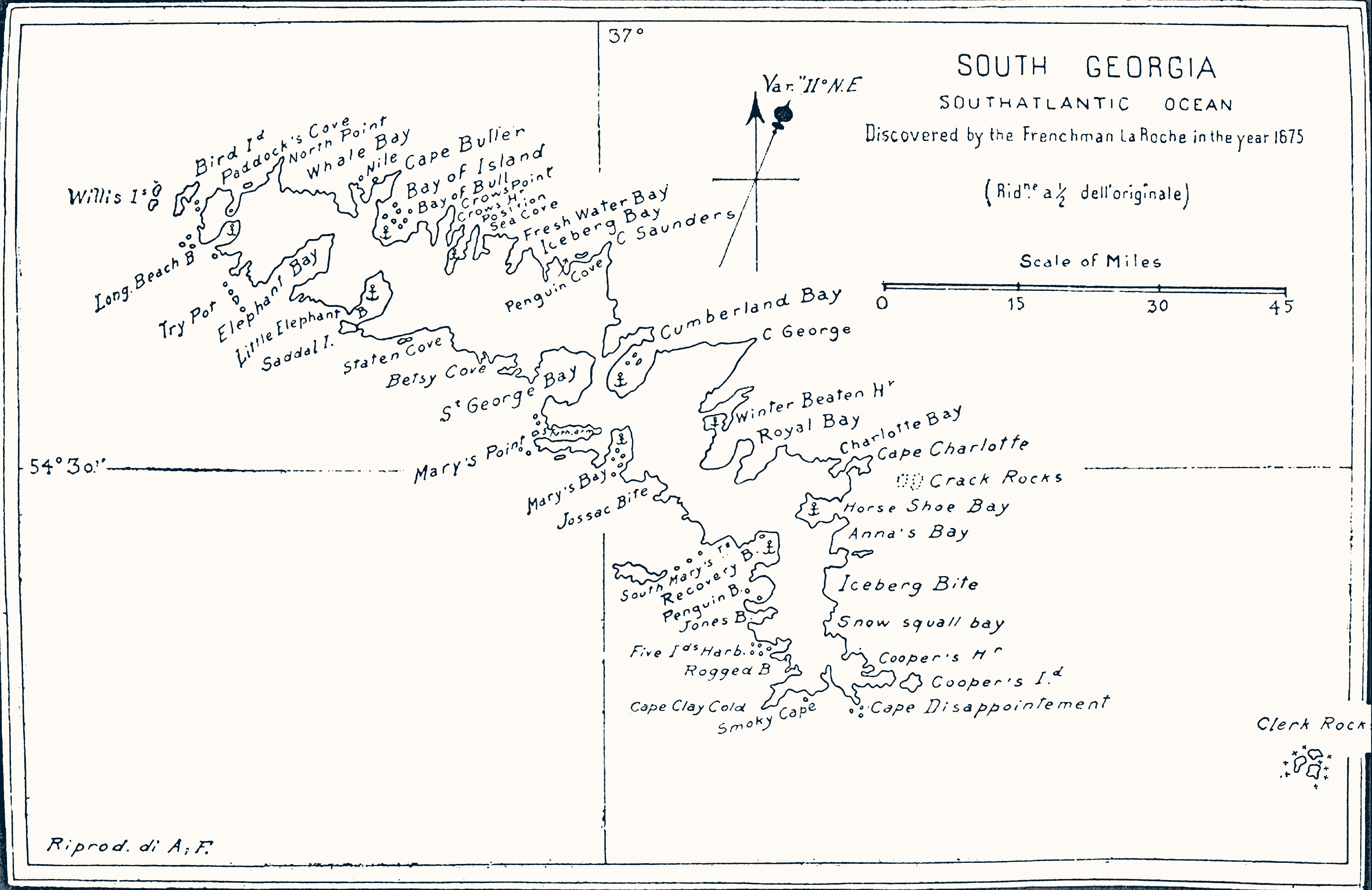
Pendleton's 1802 map showing Cape Charlotte

Cape Charlotte (located at 54°32′S 35°54′W) is a cape that forms the southeast side of the entrance to Royal Bay on the north coast near the eastern end of South Georgia in the Atlantic Ocean. It was discovered in 1775 by a British expedition under Captain James Cook, who named it for Queen Charlotte.
