= Cape Disappointment (South Georgia) =

Headland; southern extremity of South Georgia

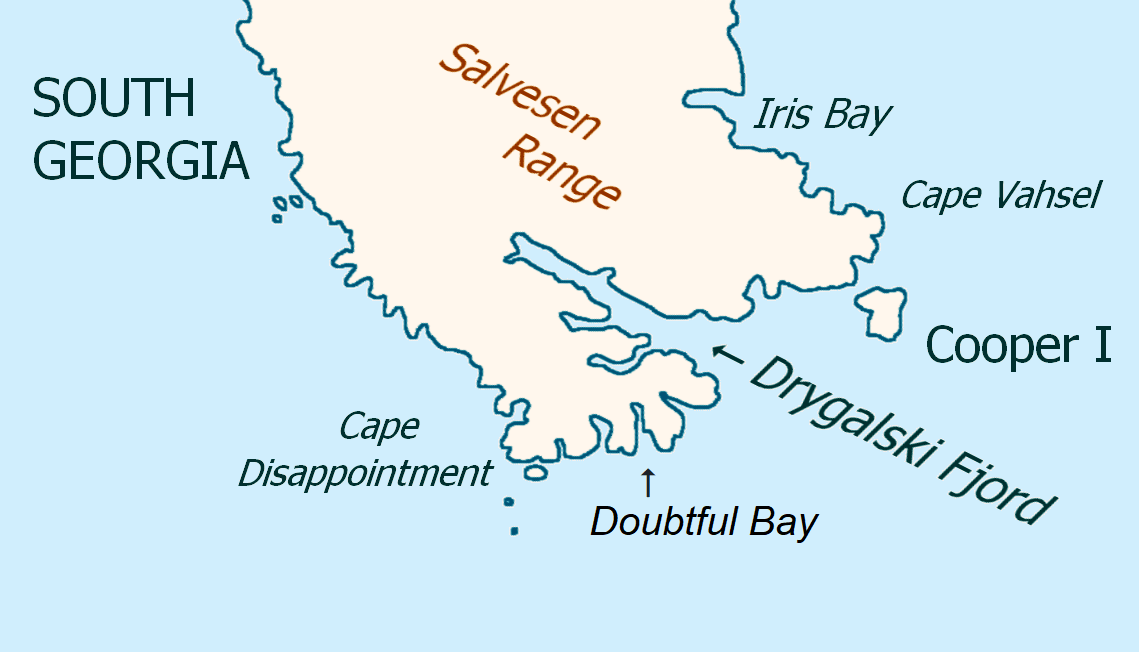
Southeast extremity of South Georgia with Cape Disappointment

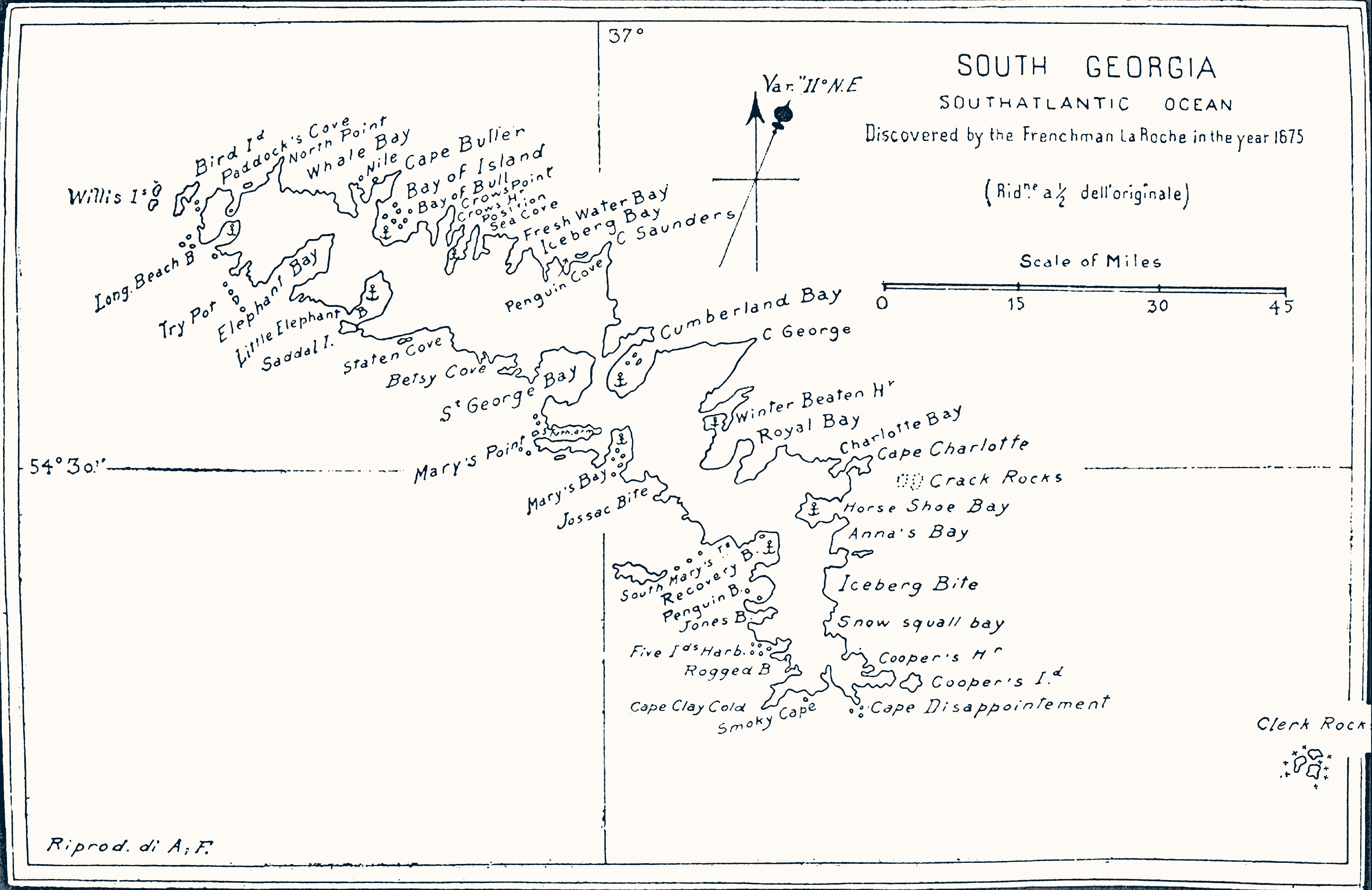
Pendleton's 1802 map showing Cape Disappointment

Cape Disappointment (54°53′S 36°7′W) is a headland which forms the southern extremity of South Georgia. It was first charted and so named in 1775 by a British expedition under James Cook, who upon reaching this position was greatly disappointed in realizing that South Georgia was an island and he had not reached the continent of Antarctica.
