= Novosilski Glacier =

Glacier in Antarctica

- Location within South Georgia Island
- Location: South Georgia
- Coordinates: 54°40′S 36°18′W
- Length: 8 nmi (15 km; 9 mi)
- Width: 2 nmi (4 km; 2 mi)
- Thickness: unknown
- Terminus: Novosilski Bay
- Status: unknown

Novosilski Glacier (54°40′S 36°18′W) is a glacier, 8 miles (13 km) long and 2 miles (3.2 km) wide, flowing in a westerly direction from the southwest slopes of the Salvesen Range to Novosilski Bay on the south coast of South Georgia. It was first surveyed and named by a German expedition in 1928–29, under Kohl-Larsen. The name has been derived from the phrase "Nearby Novosilski Bay".

== See also ==
- List of glaciers in the Antarctic
- Glaciology
