= Hamberg Glacier =

Glacier in Antarctica

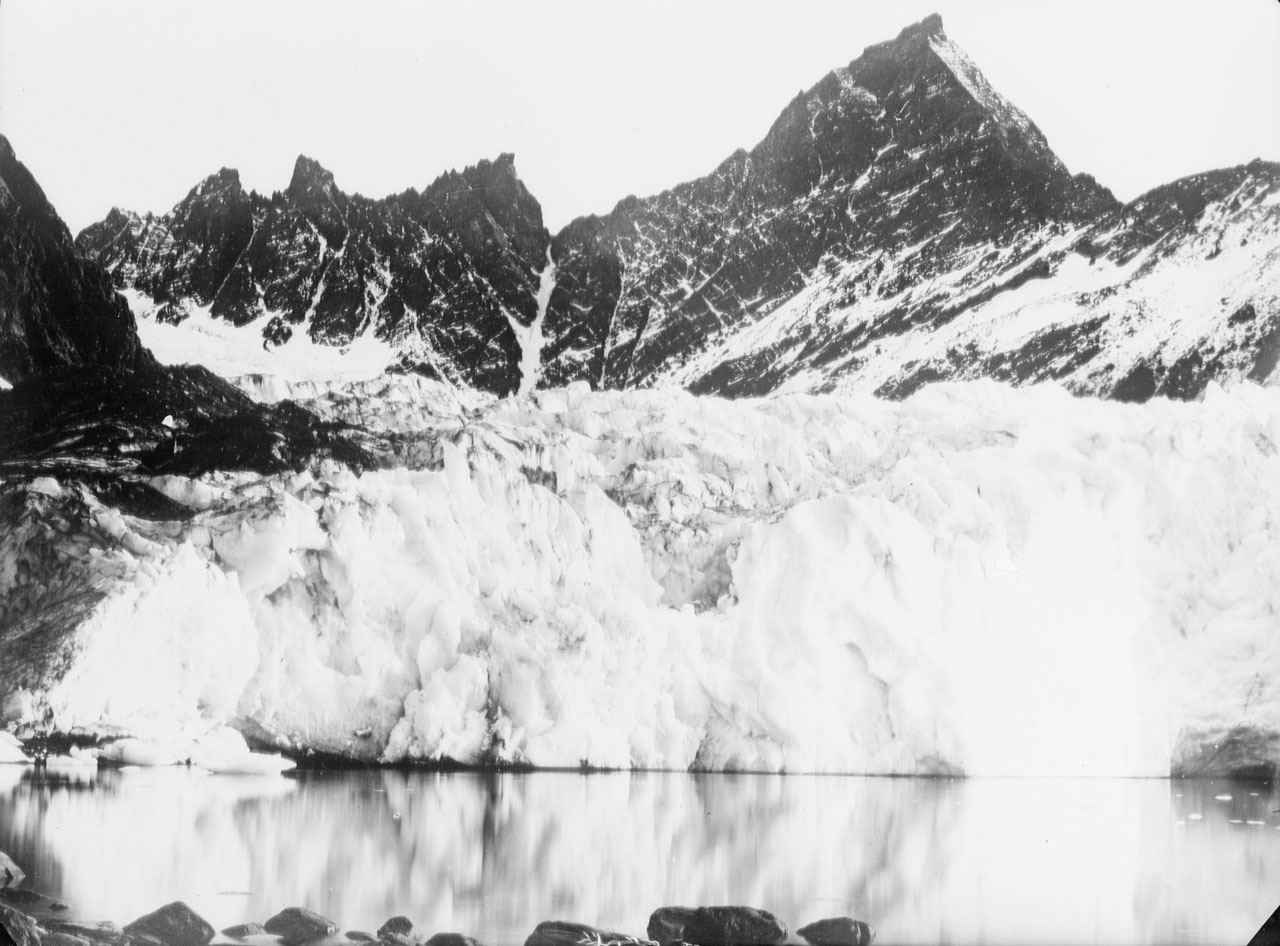
- The ice cliffs of the snout of Hamberg Glacier, Moraine Fjord, South Georgia

- Location within South Georgia Island
- Location: South Georgia
- Coordinates: 54°21′S 36°31′W
- Thickness: unknown
- Terminus: Moraine Fjord
- Status: unknown

Hamberg Glacier (54°21′S 36°31′W) is a glacier which flows in an east-northeasterly direction from the northeast side of Mount Sugartop to the west side of the head of Moraine Fjord, South Georgia. It was charted by the Swedish Antarctic Expedition, 1901–04, under Otto Nordenskiöld, who named it for Axel Hamberg, a Swedish geographer, mineralogist and Arctic explorer.

== See also ==
- List of glaciers in the Antarctic
- Glaciology
