= Geikie Glacier =

Glacier in South Georgia, Antarctica

- Location within South Georgia Island
- Location: South Georgia
- Coordinates: 54°17′S 36°41′W
- Thickness: unknown
- Terminus: Cumberland West Bay
- Status: unknown

Geikie Glacier flows northeast to Mercer Bay, at the southwest end of Cumberland West Bay, South Georgia. It was first charted by the Swedish Antarctic Expedition, 1901–04, under Otto Nordenskiöld, who named it after Sir Archibald Geikie, a noted Scottish geologist and Director-General of the Geological Survey of Great Britain, 1882–1901.

It should not be confused with Geikie Glacier (58° 35' 48" N, 136° 36' 34" W), part of Glacier Bay National Park and Preserve in Southeast Alaska. The Alaskan Geikie Glacier was named in 1879 by John Muir for James Geikie (1839–1915), Sir Archibald's younger brother. By 1892, the glacier had retreated and broken in two. The more northerly glacier retained the name "Geikie," and the other, renamed "Wood Glacier," has since disappeared.

== See also ==
- List of glaciers in the Antarctic
- Glaciology
