= Undine Harbour =

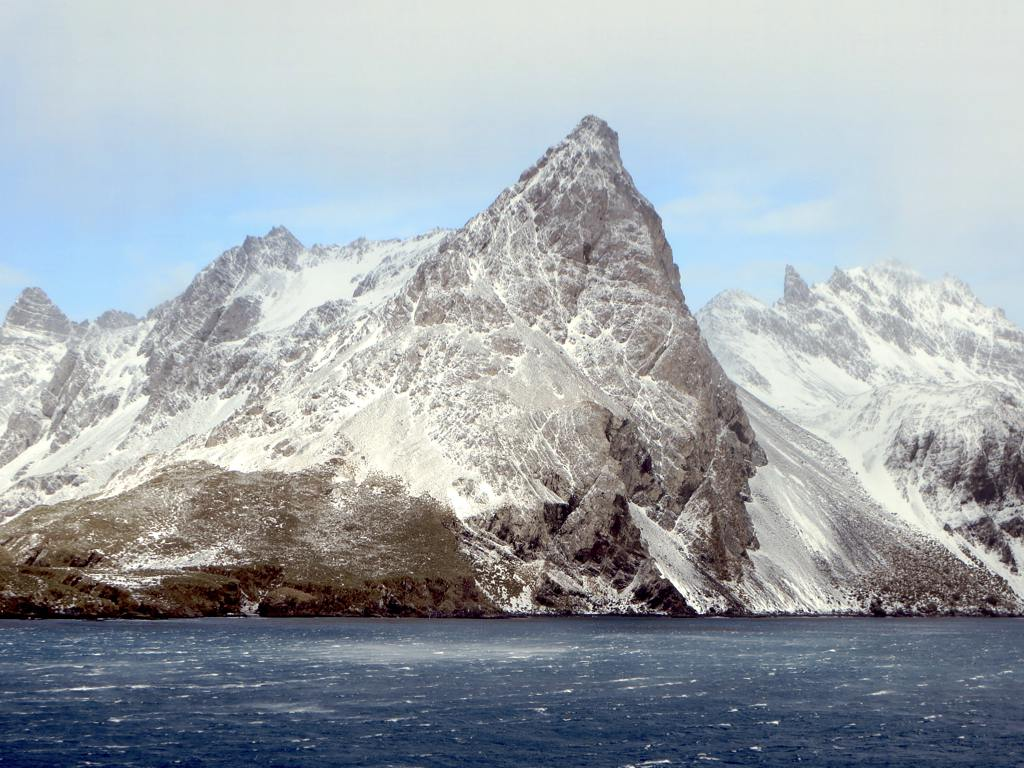
- A peak near Cape Paryadin rises above Undine Harbour
- Interactive map of Undine Harbour
- Location: South Georgia
- Coordinates: 54.0400°S 37.9626°W
- Type: Bay
- Ocean/sea sources: South Atlantic Ocean

Undine Harbour (54.0400°S 37.9626°W) is a small bay at the head of the embayment between Cape Paryadin and Cape Chaplin on the south coast of South Georgia.

== Location ==
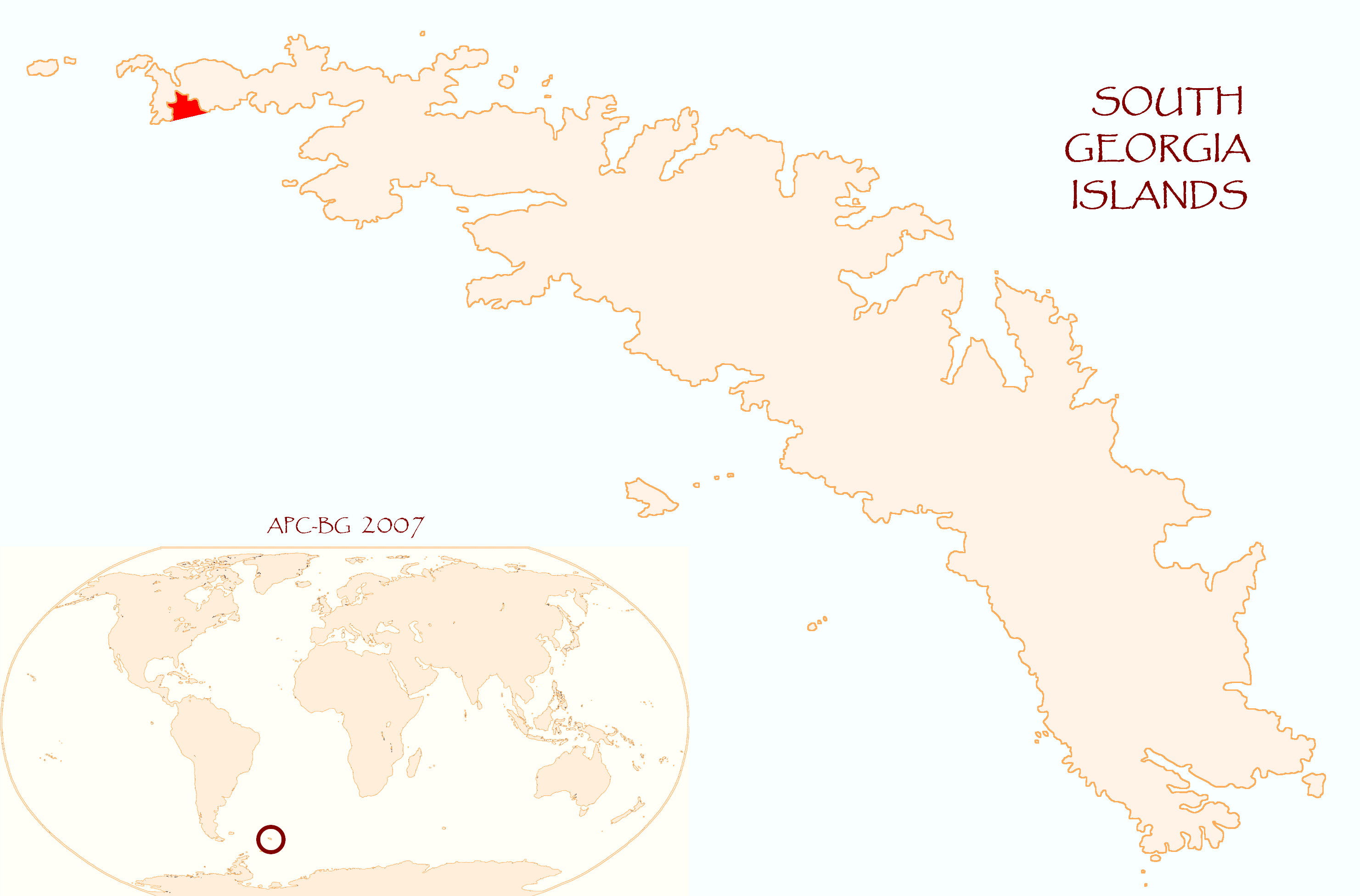
South Georgia Islands. Undine Harbour on the south of the northwest end of South Georgia

Undine Harbour is near the west end of South Georgia, to the south of a narrow isthmus that separates it from the Inner Bay of Elsehul on the north coast. It lies between Matthews Point to the west and O'Connor Island to the east. It forms the innermost bay in the larger Adventure Bay, which lies between Cape Paryadin to the west and Chaplin Head to east. Grassolm is an island in Adventure Bay. Johan Harbour is to the west of Undine Harbour. Coal Harbour and Frida Hole are to the east.

== Exploration and name ==
On 12 March 1823 Captain James Weddell with his two vessels, the Jane and the Beaufoy anchored in Adventure Bay, South Georgia, touching land for the first time in five months. He wrote that "it was not a country the most indulgent", but they did find some bitter green herbs which helped to prevent scurvy, and they found abundant young albatrosses that provided excellent fresh meat. Weddell wrote, however, that the meat was "not sufficiently firm to be compared with that of any domestic fowl." Weddell's expedition left in the middle of April, heading for the Falkland Islands, where they spent the winter.

Undine Harbour, with Johan Harbour, Coal Harbour, and Frida Hole, may form part of the feature called "Adventure Bay" by James Weddell, 1823, and "Discovery Bay" by Discovery Investigations (DI), 1929. The recommended name Undine Harbour, after the sealing ship Undine of the Compañía Argentina de Pesca, has been consistently used for this bay since about 1912.

== Features ==
Features of the bay include, from west to east:

=== Matthews Point ===
54.0421°S 37.9645°W. A point forming the west side of the entrance to Undine Harbor. It was charted in the period 1926-30 by Discovery Investigations personnel and named for L. Harrison Matthews, British zoologist, member of the staff of the Discovery Investigations, 1924–35, who worked at South Georgia in 1924-27.

=== Survey Isthmus ===
54.0318°S 37.9613°W. A narrow isthmus about 39 metres (128 ft) high separating Elsehul and Undine Harbor. The name appears to first be used on a 1931 British Admiralty chart.

=== Hope Valley ===
54.0305°S 37.9544°W. A valley extending east-northeast for nearly 3 nautical miles (5.6 km; 3.5 mi) from the head of Undine Harbor. It was charted and named "Tal der Hoffnung" by a German expedition under Ludwig Kohl-Larsen 1928–29. An English form of the original name is approved.

== Western features ==
Features to the west of the bay include, from west to east,

=== Cape Paryadin ===
54.0700°S 38.0118°W. A cape which forms the southernmost point of the west tip of South Georgia. Discovered in 1775 by a British expedition under Cook. The cape was resighted in 1819 by a Russian expedition under Fabian Gottlieb von Bellingshausen, who named it for Ya. Poryadin, navigator on the Vostok. The spelling "Paryadin" for the cape has become established through long usage.

=== Andrews Rocks ===
54.0728°S 37.9953°W. A small group of rocks 0.5 nautical miles (0.93 km; 0.58 mi) east of Cape Paryadin. The rocks are bare of vegetation and awash in heavy seas. The name Andrews Islands was probably given by Lieutenant Commander J.M. Chaplin, Royal Navy, of the Discovery during his survey of the area in 1926. The South Georgia Survey (SGS) of 1955–56 reported that "rocks" is a more suitable descriptive term for this group.

=== Olsen Rock ===
54.07688°S 38.01039°W. A rock lying 0.5 nautical miles (0.93 km; 0.58 mi) southeast of Cape Paryadin. Charted by Discovery Investigations personnel in 1926-27. Surveyed by the SGS in the period 1951-57, and named by the UK Antarctic Place-Names Committee (UK-APC) for Søren Olsen, gunner of the South Georgia Whaling Company at Leith Harbour, 1926–30, 1933–39 and 1945-53.

=== Laurie Point ===
54.0582°S 37.9785°W. The east extremity of a small island which lies close to shore and marks the south side of the entrance to Johan Harbour. It was surveyed by the SGS, 1956–57, and named by the UK-APC for A.H. Laurie, member of the scientific staff of the Discovery Investigations Marine Station at Grytviken, in 1930–31, who also worked on the William Scoresby in 1929-30 and on Discovery II in 1930.

=== Saluta Rocks ===
54.0567°S 37.9526°W. A group of rocks 1 nautical mile (1.9 km; 1.2 mi) east of Laurie Point. The name "Mutt and Jeff" was probably given by Lieutenant Commander J.M. Chaplin of the Discovery during his survey of the Undine Harbour area in 1926. The SGS, 1955–56, reported that the name is misleading; there are not two rocks as implied, but a group. The rocks were renamed by the UK-APC for the Saluta, a transport of the South Georgia Whaling Co. for many years.

=== Johan Harbour ===
54.0519°S 37.9827°W. A small bay 0.5 nautical miles (0.93 km; 0.58 mi) southwest of Undine Harbour. The name "Johann Harbour" was used on a chart resulting from a survey of this area by Discovery Investigations personnel in 1926-27. The SGS reported in 1957 that "Johan" is the correct spelling of the name, which is well known locally.

=== Begg Point ===
54.0486°S 37.9786°W. A point forming the northeast side of the entrance to Johan Harbor. Surveyed by the SGS, 1956-57. Named by the UK-APC for Captain Sinclair Begg, Master of the whaling transport Coronda, 1933–40; Master of the Southern Opal, 1945–46; Manager on Southern Harvester, 1946–47; and Manager of the South Georgia Whaling Company station at Leith Harbour, 1947-51.

=== Hard Head ===
54.04678°S 37.96699°W. A high tussock-topped headland 0.2 nautical miles (0.37 km; 0.23 mi) south of Matthews Point on the west side of the approach to Undine Harbour. Surveyed by personnel on HMS Owen in 1960-61 and given this descriptive name by the UK-APC.

=== Birdie Rocks ===
54.0507°S 37.9689°W. A group of rocks lying south of Undine Harbor between Begg Point and Saluta Rocks, off the west end of South Georgia. The name appears to be first used on a 1929 British Admiralty chart.

== Eastern features ==
Features to the east of the bay include, from west to east,

=== Bill Inlet ===
54.0405°S 37.9545°W. A small inlet lying immediately east of Undine Harbor. The name appears to be first used on a 1929 British Admiralty chart.

=== Coal Island ===
54.0421°S 37.9461°W. A small tussock-covered island with off-lying rocks marking the west side of the entrance to Coal Harbor, near the west end of South Georgia. Charted by Discovery Investigations personnel on the Discovery during the period 1926-30, and by HMS Owen in 1960-61. Named by the UK-APC in 1963 in association with Coal Harbor.

=== Coal Harbor ===
54.0426°S 37.9421°W. A small bay 0.5 nautical miles (0.93 km; 0.58 mi) east of Undine Harbor. The name Coaling Harbor, given in about 1912, suggests a possible early use of the bay by sealers and whalers. The name was shortened to Coal Harbor by Discovery Investigations personnel.

=== Frida Hole ===
54.0481°S 37.9303°W. A small bay lying 0.5 nautical miles (0.93 km; 0.58 mi) southeast of Coal Harbor. Probably named by early whalers or sealers who used the bay as an anchorage.

=== Grassholm ===
54.06083°S 37.93454°W. An island 1 nautical mile (1.9 km; 1.2 mi) south of Frida Hole. The name Em Island was given for this feature, probably by Discovery Investigations personnel who surveyed this coast in 1926. The SGS, 1951–52, reported that this feature is known to whalers and sealers as "Grassholmen," and that Em Island is unknown locally. The indefinite form of the name has been approved.

=== Chaplin Head ===
54.05786°S 37.90267°W. A headland between Undine Harbor and Schlieper Bay. Charted by Discovery Investigations in 1926, when the hill above the headland was called "Sharp Peak." Following the SGS, 1951–57, renamed Chaplin Head after Lieutenant Commander John M. Chaplin, Royal Navy (1888-1977), survey officer in Discovery, 1925–27, and in charge of a hydrographic survey party in South Georgia, 1928-30.

== Sources ==
- Alberts, Fred G., ed. (1995), Geographic Names of the Antarctic (PDF) (2 ed.), United States Board on Geographic Names This article incorporates public domain material from websites or documents of the United States Board on Geographic Names.
- Mill, Hugh Robert (1905), The Siege of the South Pole, F.A. Stokes Company
- "Relation: Undine Harbour (7889066)", OpenStreetMap
