= Lyell Glacier, South Georgia =

Glacier in Antarctica

Lyell Glacier
- Location within South Georgia Island
- Location: South Georgia
- Coordinates: 54°17′S 36°37′W
- Thickness: unknown
- Terminus: Cumberland West Bay
- Status: unknown

Lyell Glacier (54°17′S 36°37′W) is a glacier flowing in a northerly direction to Harpon Bay at the southeast head of Cumberland West Bay, South Georgia. It was mapped by the Swedish Antarctic Expedition, 1901–04, under Otto Nordenskjöld, who named it for Sir Charles Lyell, an eminent British geologist.

== See also ==
- List of glaciers in the Antarctic
- Glaciology
