= Mount Sugartop =

Mountain in South Georgia

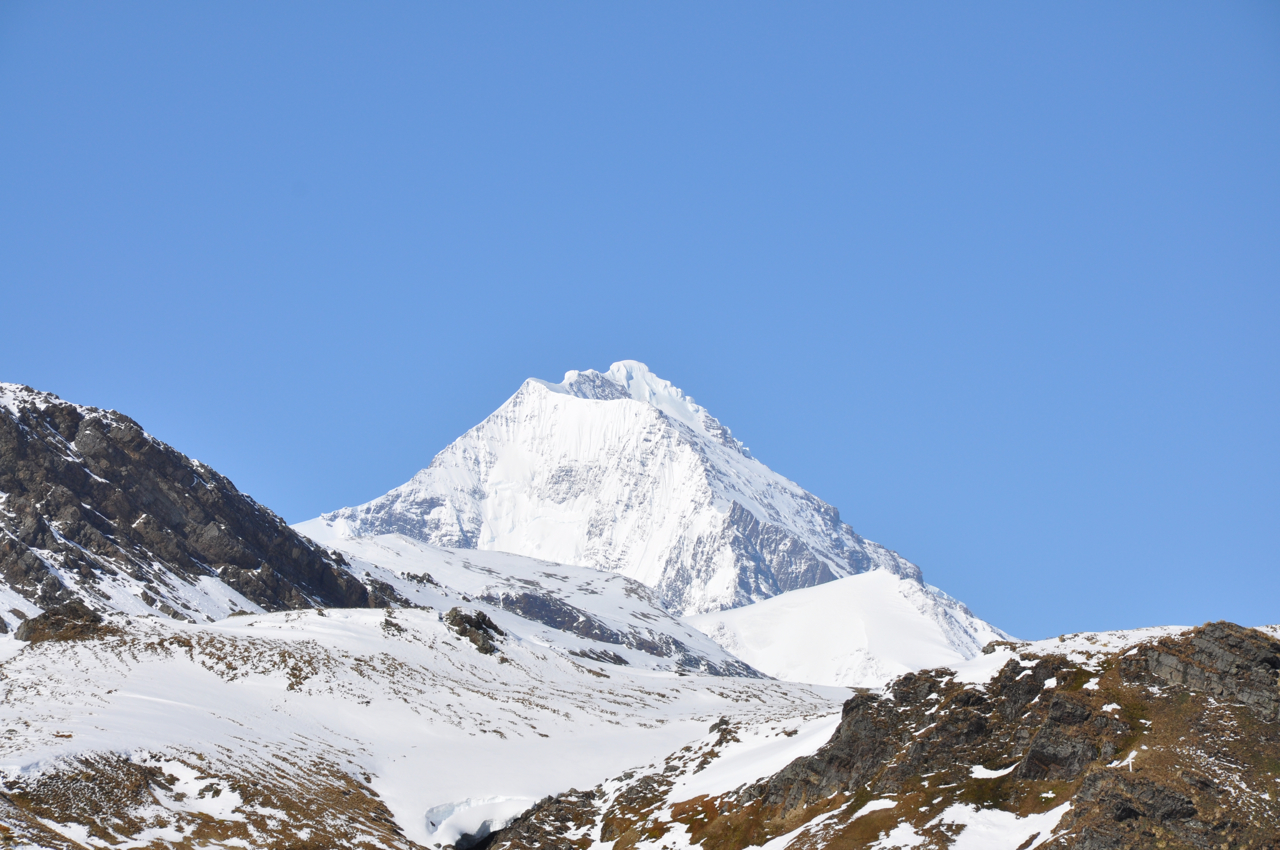
Mount Sugartop

Mount Sugartop (54°22′S 36°38′W) is a prominent, partly snow-covered mountain, 2,325 m, standing 5 miles (8 km) northwest of Mount Paget in the Allardyce Range of South Georgia. The name "Sugarloaf Peak" has appeared on maps for this feature for many years, but the South Georgia Survey, following its 1951-52 surveying expedition, reported that the name Mount Sugartop is well established locally for this mountain. This latter name is approved on the basis of local usage.
