= Doris Bay =

Bay in South Georgia

Coordinates: 54°27′S 36°8′W

Doris Bay is a small bay immediately southeast of Saint Andrews Bay, along the north coast of South Georgia. The name dates back to about 1929 and is now well established.
