= Cumberland West Bay =

Body of water in South Georgia, South Atlantic Ocean

Coordinates: 54°14′S 36°35′W

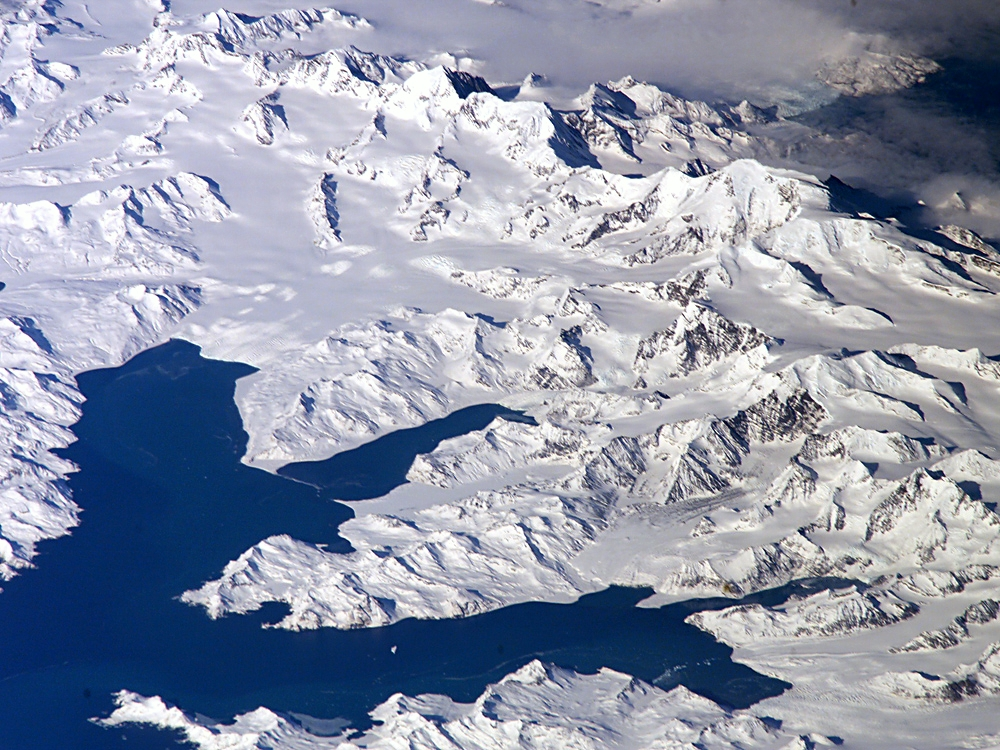
Cumberland Bay; Cumberland West Bay is below the Thatcher Peninsula

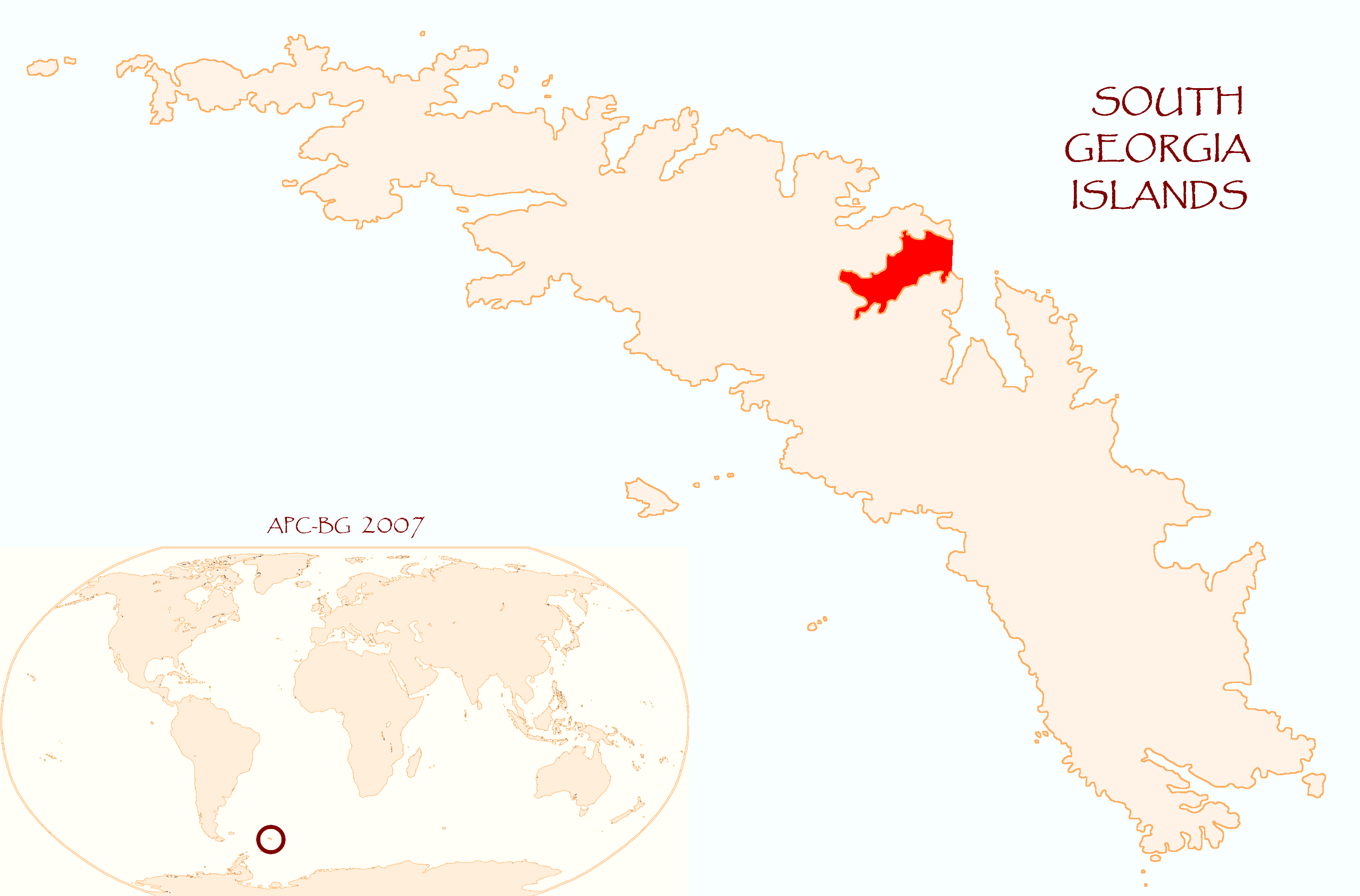
Location of Cumberland West Bay on South Georgia Island

Cumberland West Bay is a bay forming the western arm of Cumberland Bay, South Georgia. It is entered southward of Larsen Point, where it is 2.5 miles (4 km) wide and extends 7 miles (11 km) in a southwest direction. It is separated from Cumberland East Bay by Thatcher Peninsula. Papua Beach is situated on its southeast shore.

This feature was first surveyed by the Swedish Antarctic Expedition, 1901–04, who named it "West Bay". It was remapped during 1926–29 by Discovery Investigations (DI) personnel and renamed "West Cumberland Bay". The shortened form West Bay was simultaneously used. Following the South Georgia Survey, 1951–52, the UK Antarctic Place-Names Committee proposed altering the name to Cumberland West Bay and rejecting all other names. This change brings together information about the whole of Cumberland Bay together in indexes.

== Named features ==
Cumberland West Bay has a complex coastline, many of whose features have been charted and individually named. They are described here beginning at the north on the west coast of the bay and proceeding southwest.

=== Northwest coast ===
The headland Larsen Point forms the west side of the entrance to Cumberland Bay. It was named for Captain Carl Anton Larsen, who visited Cumberland Bay in the Jason in 1893–94. The Crutch is a saddle-shaped col on a ridge located 1.5 nautical miles (3 km) northwest of Larsen Point. It was charted and descriptively named by DI personnel in the period 1925–1929. Jason Island, named for the ship, is located 1 nautical mile (2 km) north of Larsen Point.

Allen Bay is a semi-circular bay 0.5 nautical miles (1 km) wide, lying 1 nautical mile (2 km) west-northwest of Larsen Point in the northern part of Cumberland West Bay. It was charted in 1926 by DI personnel on the Discovery and was named by them, probably for H. T. Allen, a member of the Discovery Committee at that time.

The next notable feature is Jason Harbour, which has several named features.

Southwest of Jason Harbour, Enten Bay shallowly indents the coast. The name "Entenbucht" (duck bay) seems to have been first used on a 1907 chart of Cumberland Bay by Dr. A. Szielasko, of the Norwegian whaler Fridtjof Nansen, who published an account of his natural history observations made at Cumberland Bay during the previous year. Enten Bay's east side is marked by Doubtful Point. Tweeny Point lies 1 nmi (1.9 km) southwest of Doubtful Point. Both of these points were first named on a 1929 British Admiralty chart.

Continuing to the west is another small bay, Carlita Bay. It was initially named Horseshoe Bay, probably during the survey of Cumberland West Bay by HMS Dartmouth in 1920. This name was later accepted for a bay close south of Cape George, less than 15 miles (24 km) away. In 1957, UKAPC renamed the feature after the Carlita, a whale catcher built in 1907 and owned by the Compañía Argentina de Pesca. Islet Point, first named on the 1929 Admiralty chart for the islet just off the point, marks the east side of the entrance to Carlita Bay.

=== Southeast coast ===
Mercer Bay, a small bay marked by Geikie Glacier at its head, sits at the southwest end of Cumberland West Bay. The bay appears on a sketch map of Cumberland Bay by Lieutenant S. A. Duse of the Swedish Antarctic Expedition, and is first used on a chart based upon survey work by DI personnel in 1926–30. It was probably named for Lieutenant Commander G. M. Mercer, Royal Naval Reserve, captain of the DI research ship William Scoresby. To the east, Teie Point separates Mercer Bay from Harpon Bay. Teie Point was named by UK-APC for the sailing vessel Teie, owned by Tonsberg Hvalfangeri. To the east of Teie Point is 1 nautical mile (2 km) wide Harpon Bay, first mapped by the SAE and named by UK-APC for the cargo vessel Harpon, built in 1897, which had been used by the Compañía Argentina de Pesca.
