= Ludwig Kohl-Larsen =

German physician, anthropologist and explorer (1884–1969)

Ludwig Kohl-Larsen (born Ludwig Kohl; 5 April 1884 in Landau in der Pfalz – 12 November 1969 in Bodensee) was a German physician, amateur anthropologist, and explorer.

== Biography ==
In 1911, he traveled as ship's doctor with Wilhelm Filchner to Antarctica, but did not participate in the expedition to the Weddell Sea due to appendicitis. At South Georgia he cured himself out and met his wife, the daughter of Carl Anton Larsen, the founder of the whaling station at Grytviken. During the First World War, he was a government doctor working in Micronesia. In 1928, he visited South Georgia with his wife and the cameraman Albert Benitz to lead the first scientific expedition to the island.

In 1931, he joined the Nazi Party, and later undertook, partly on behalf of the Deutsche Forschungsgemeinschaft, expeditions to Tanganyika Territory in search of "primitive man". In 1938/1939, he discovered Australopithecus afarensis at Laetoli, without realizing the importance of his find. He also collected folklore of the Hadza and Isanzu. He and his wife Margit performed excavations at the Mumba cave where they found a numerous Middle Stone Age artifacts. He attempted to prove that all people have a common origin, but that African peoples remained in the state of primitive man, while the Aryan race had developed. Such 'scholarship' was at odds with most anthropological concerns of the day in Africa.

In 1939, Kohl-Larsen became Professor of Ethnology at the University of Tübingen. He lost his position in the course of denazification after the war, but worked from 1949 at the Institute of Early History in Tübingen.

Due in part to his politics, but also to dubious scholarship, Kohl-Larsen is not highly regarded amongst contemporary East Africanists.

== Bibliography ==
- Kohl-Larsen, Ludwig (1941): Die Issansu, Ackerbauer und Viehzüchter im abflußlosen Gebiet Deutsch-Ostafrikas. Medizin und Kult. Veröffentlichung der Reichsstelle für den Unterrichtsfilm. Reichsstelle für den Unterrichtsfilm.
- Kohl-Larsen, Ludwig (1956). Das Elefantenspiel. Mythen, Riesen und Stammessagen. Volkserzählungen der Tindiga. Das Gesicht der Völker (in German). Eisenach • Kassel: Erich Röth-Verlag. The book is a collection of Hadzabe myths about giants, also some tribe myths about culture heroes, and anecdotical tales.
- Kohl-Larsen (1956): Das Zauberhorn—Märchen und Tiergeschichten der Tindiga. Das Gesicht der Völker. Kulturkreis Ostafrikanische Steppenjäger. Dichtung der Kindiga. (Eisenach und Kassel)
- Kohl-Larsen (1958): Wildbeuter in Ostafrika: Die Tindiga, ein Jager und Sammlervolk. Berlin: Dietrich Reimer Verlag.
- Kohl-Larsen (1991): Der Mann, der Lucy’s Ahnen fand: Lebenserinnerungen und Materialien herausgegeben von Erich Renner. (Landau 1991) bes. 15, 'Wir suchen die Tindiga' 172-186
