= Royal Bay =

Bay in South Georgia

Coordinates: 54°32′S 36°0′W

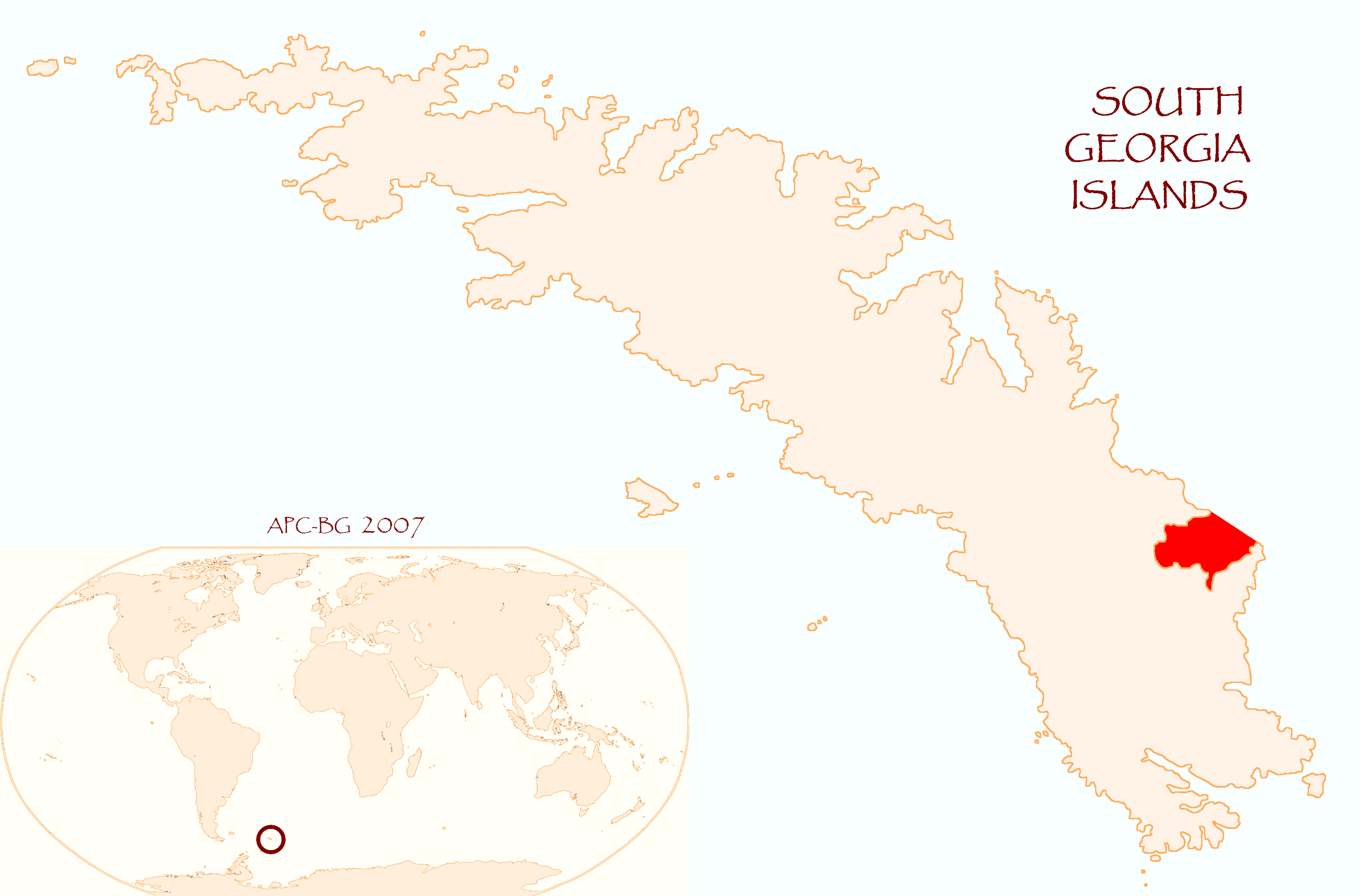
Location of Royal Bay

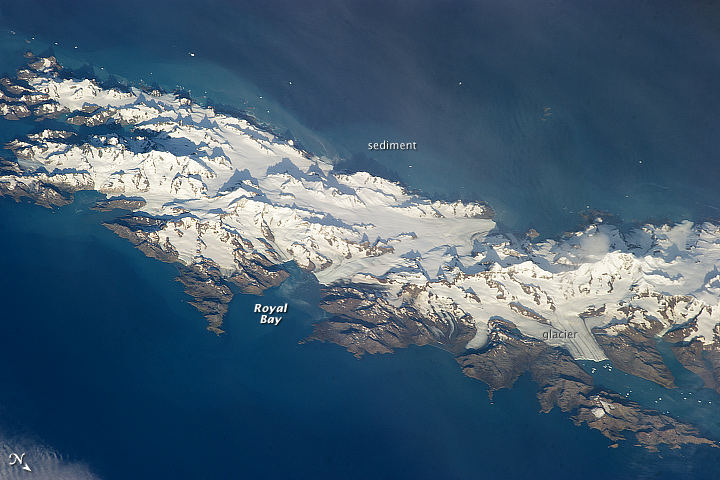
Royal Bay and South Georgia Island as seen from orbit

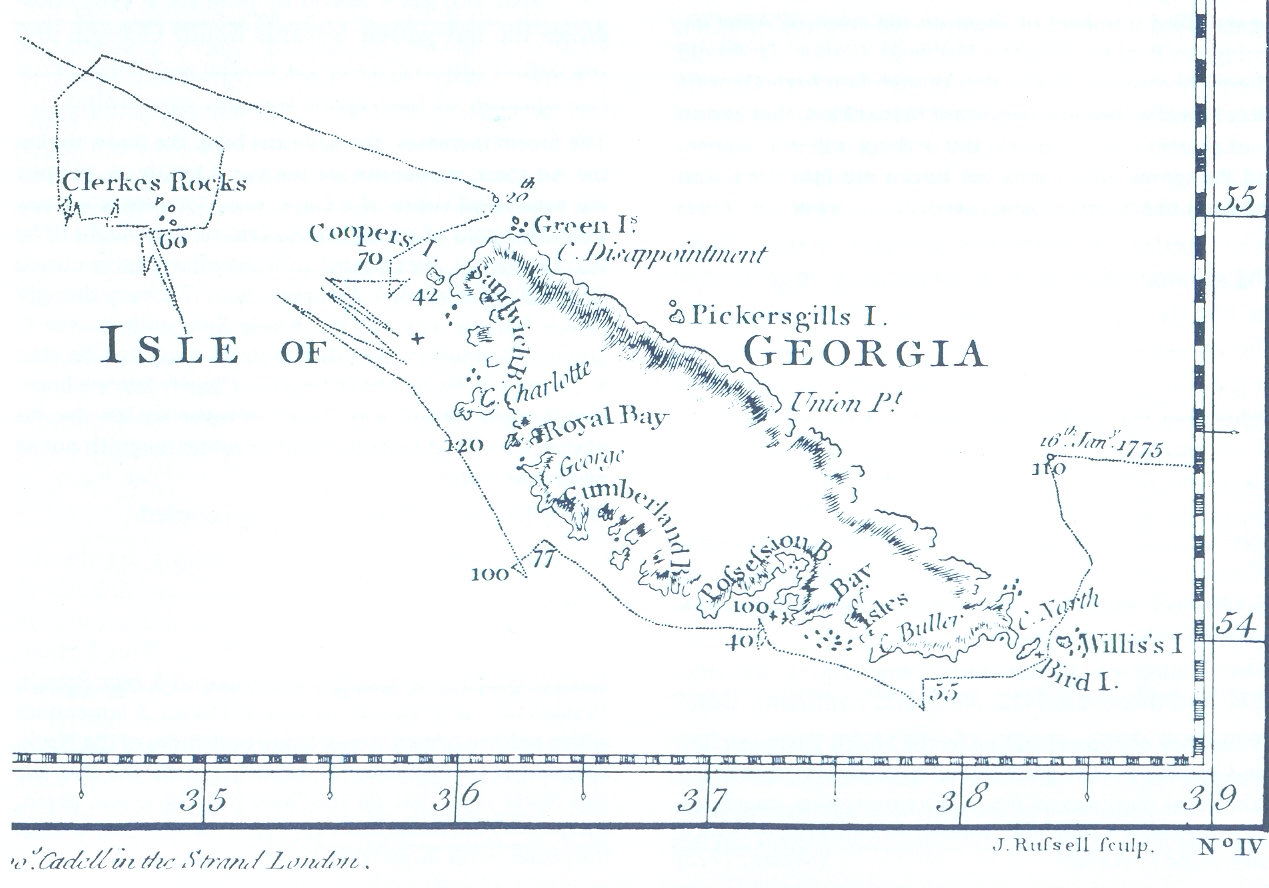
Royal Bay can be seen on Cook's South-Up map

Royal Bay is a bay, 6 km (3.7 mi) wide and indenting 8 km (5.0 mi), entered between Cape Charlotte and Cape Harcourt along the north coast of South Georgia.

Like other parts of the archipelago, many birds breed here, including king penguins, gentoo penguins, and blue-eyed cormorants.

== History ==
Royal Bay was discovered and named by a British expedition under James Cook in 1775.

In 1882 a German group of the International Polar Year Investigations expedition under Schrader was sent out to observe the transit of Venus and was stationed at Royal Bay. They were based on the north shore of the bay in 1882–83. The group came in on the steam corvette SMS Moltke which was the first powered vessel to reach South Georgia. Moltke Harbour, a one-mile wide bay on the northwest side of Royal Bay is named after it.

== See also ==
- Köppen Point
