= Stromness Bay =

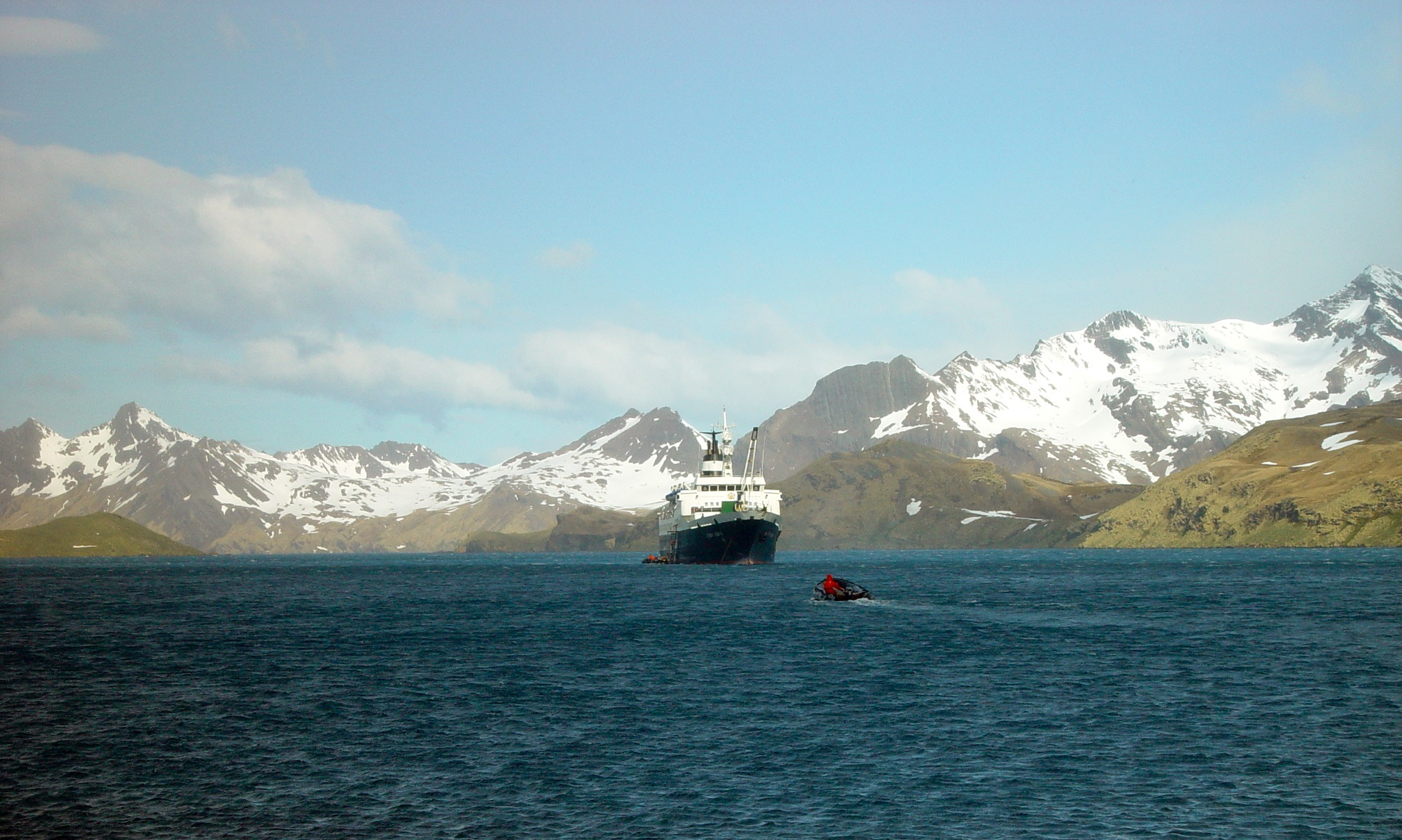
- Stromness Bay
- Interactive map of Stromness Bay
- Location: South Georgia
- Coordinates: 54°9′S 36°38′W
- Type: Bay
- Ocean/sea sources: Atlantic Ocean

Stromness Bay is a bay 3 miles (4.8 km) wide, entered between Cape Saunders and Busen Point on the north coast of South Georgia. Stromness Bay, like Leith Harbour takes its name from a location in Scotland, Stromness, on the Orkney Mainland. This is partially because both places called Stromness were whaling centres. The headland forming the southeast side of the entrance to Stromness Bay is named Busen Point. Bucentaur Rock lies close northeast of Busen Point.

== Location ==
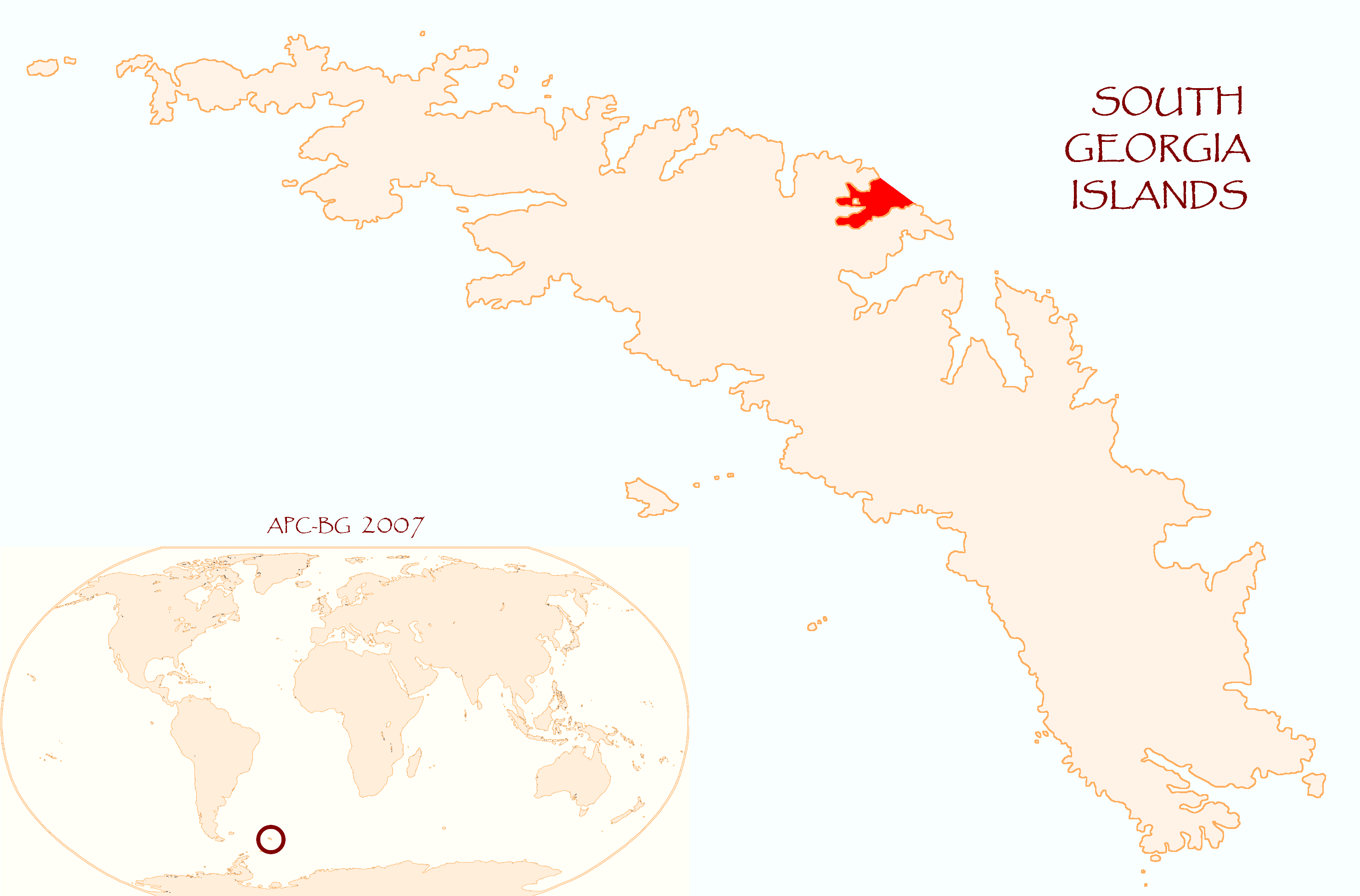
Location of Stromness Bay on South Georgia

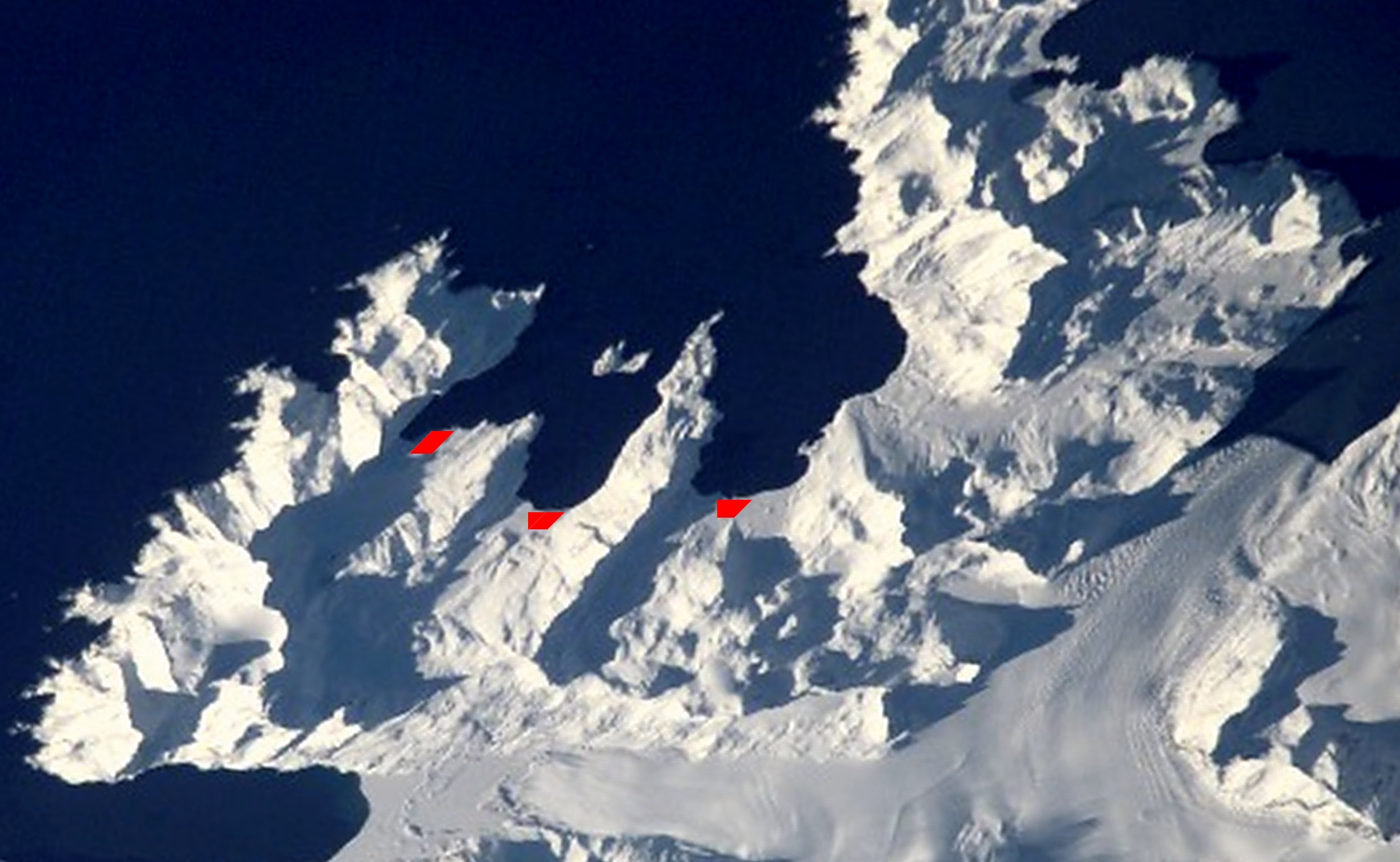
Stromness Bay with (left to right) Leith Harbour, Stromness, and Husvik (NASA imagery).

== Features ==
=== Husvik Harbor ===
Husvik Harbor 54°10'S, 36°40'W The southernmost of three harbors at the head of Stromness Bay, along the N coast of South Georgia. The name dates back to about 1912, and was probably given by Norwegian whalers who frequented the harbor and established a whaling station at its head.

=== Kanin Point ===
Kanin Point 54°11'S, 36°42'E A rocky point lying 2 mi WSW of Kelp Point on the S side of Husvik Harbor. The descriptive name Rocky Point was given for this feature, probably by DI personnel who surveyed Husvik Harbor in 1928. This name is used elsewhere in the Antarctic. The SGS, 1951-52, reported that this feature is known at the Husvik whaling station as Kanin Point (the word Kanin meaning rabbit). The name presumably arose from one of several attempts made since 1872 to introduce rabbits into the island. Kanin Point is approved on the basis of local usage.

=== Alert Cove ===
Alert Cove 54°11'S, 36°42'W A small cove lying S of Kanin Point in Husvik Harbor, Stromness Bay. Charted by DI personnel in 1928 and is named after Alert, the motorboat used by the DI survey party.

=== Alert Channel ===
Alert Channel 54°10'S, 36°42'W A small channel between Whaler Channel and Bar Rocks, and leading to the head of Husvik Harbor in Stromness Bay, South Georgia. Charted by DI personnel in 1928 and named after Alert, the motorboat used by the DI survey party.

=== Clear Point ===
\Clear Point 54°08'S, 36°40'W Point forming the NE side of the entrance to Leith Harbor. The name appears to be first used on a 1929 British Admiralty chart.

=== Framnaes Point ===
Framnaes Point 54°08'S, 36°39'W Point 1 mi SW of Cape Saunders, on the N side of Stromness Bay, South Georgia. The name was given prior to 1920, probably by Norwegian whalers operating in the area.

=== Factory Point ===
Factory Point 54°08'S, 36°41'W Small point on the W side and close to the head of Leith Harbor. The name was probably given by whalers because of its nearness to Messrs. Salvesen and Company's whaling station near the head of Leith Harbor.

=== Hansen Point ===
Hansen Point 54°08'S, 36°41'W A point lying between Factory and Harbour Points on the W side of Leith Harbor. The name appears on a chart showing the results of surveys by DI personnel in 1927 and 1929, and is probably for Leganger Hansen, manager of the whaling station at Leith Harbor at that time.

=== Harbour Point ===
Harbour Point 54°09'S, 36°41'W A point separating Leith and Stromness Harbors, in Stromness Bay, South Georgia. This descriptive name was in use as early as 1920 and was probably applied by whalers operating from Stromness Bay.

=== Harrison Point ===
Harrison Point 54°10'S, 36°36'W A point marked by a string of off-lying rocks, lying 1.5 mi W of Busen Point on the S side of Stromness Bay. Charted in 1927 by DI personnel and named Matthews Point for L. Harrison Matthews, British zoologist and member of the staff of the Discovery Investigations, 1924-35, who worked at South Georgia in 1924-27. In 1954, the UK-APC recommended that this name be altered to Harrison Point to avoid duplication with Matthews Point (also named for L. Harrison Matthews), a better known feature in Undine Harbor, South Georgia. This change allows Harrison Matthews' name to be retained for this feature, while the confusing duplication of names is avoided.

=== Busen Point ===
Busen Point 54°09'S, 36°33'W Point forming the SE side of the entrance to Stromness Bay. The point was known at a much earlier date, but the name was first used on the charts based upon the 1927-29 survey by DI personnel. Named for the Busen, a Norwegian whaling transport vessel which was often stationed at the head of Husvik Harbor in Stromness Bay.

== Rocks and islands ==
=== Bar Rocks ===
Bar Rocks 54°10'S, 36°42'W Group of low rocks which lie near the head of Husvik Harbor. Charted by DI personnel in 1928 and so named by them, presumably because their presence obstructs or impedes vessels approaching the head of the harbor.

=== Black Rocks ===
Black Rocks 54°08'S, 36°38'W Small group of rocks 0.5 mi SE of Framnaes Point in the N part of Stromness Bay, South Georgia. The name Blenheim Rocks has appeared for these rocks, but since about 1930 the name Black Rocks has been used more consistently.

=== Grass Island ===
Grass Island 54°09'S, 36°40'W Conspicuous island lying across the entrance to Stromness Harbor. It was known as Mutton Island as early as 1912, but since 1920 the name Grass Island has been consistently used.

=== Bill Rock ===
Bill Rock 54°09'S, 36°39'W Rock which lies 0.3 mi E of the S end of Grass Island in Stromness Bay, South Georgia. Charted and named in 1928 by DI personnel.

=== Ems Rock ===
Ems Rock 54°10'S, 36°35'W Rock midway between Harrison Point and Busen Point in the S part of Stromness Bay. Charted by DI personnel under Lt. Cdr. J.M. Chaplin in 1927 and 1929. Named in 1957 by the UK-APC for the sailing vessel Ems, owned by the Tønsberg Hvalfangeri, Husvik, located at the head of Husvik Harbor in Stromness Bay.

=== Bucentaur Rock ===
Bucentaur Rock 54°09'S, 36°33'W The outermost of three rocks lying close NE of Busen Point, at the SE side of the entrance to Stromness Bay. The name Low Rock was given for this feature by DI personnel during their survey in 1927, but this name is used elsewhere in the Antarctic. Following the survey by SGS, 1951-52, the feature was renamed Bucentaur Rock after the floating factory Bucentaur, which was anchored at Husvik in the early years of the whaling station after 1907, and from which the Husvik transport Busen and the catchers Busen I, II, III, etc., derive their names.

=== Brain Island ===
Brain Island 54°10'S, 36°42'W Island at the N side of Husvik Harbor, in Stromness Bay, South Georgia. Charted and named by DI personnel in 1928.

=== Camana Rock ===
Camana Rock 54°10'S, 36°37'W A rock midway between Kelp Point and Harrison Point in the S part of Stromness Bay, South Georgia. Mapped by DI personnel under Lt. Cdr. J.M. Chaplin in 1927 and 1929. Named in 1957 by the UK-APC for the sailing vessel Camana, owned by Tønsberg Hvalfangeri, Husvik, located at the head of Husvik Harbor in Stromness Bay.

=== Discovery Rock ===
Discovery Rock 54°09'S, 36°35'W Submerged rock in Stromness Bay, lying 0.7 mi NNE of Ems Rock. The rock was positioned by Discovery Investigations personnel under Lt. Cdr. J.M. Chaplin, RN, who made surveys of Stromness Bay in 1927 and 1929. They probably applied the name, which is now well established in local use.

== See also ==
- Stromness Whaling Station
- Husvik
- Leith Harbour

== Sources ==
- Alberts, Fred G., ed. (1995), Geographic Names of the Antarctic (PDF) (2 ed.), United States Board on Geographic Names This article incorporates public domain material from websites or documents of the United States Board on Geographic Names.
