= Jumbo (disambiguation) =

Jumbo was a 19th-century circus elephant.

Jumbo may also refer to:

== Arts, entertainment and media ==
=== Music ===
- Jumbo (musical), a 1935 book musical about a circus
- Jumbo (band), a Mexican rock band
- "Jumbo" (Underworld song)
- "Jumbo" (Bee Gees song)

=== Fictional characters ===
- Mrs. Jumbo, a character in Dumbo
- Jumbo Carnation, a character in the Marvel Comics Universe
- General Jumbo, a UK comic-strip character
- Takashi Takeda or Jumbo, a character in Yotsuba&!
- “Jumbo” Bill Roach, a character in Tinker, Tailor, Soldier, Spy

=== Other arts, entertainment and media ===
- Jumbo (2008 film), an Indian animated film
  - Jumbo 2, its 2009 sequel
- Jumbo (2020 film), a drama film
- Jumbo (2025 film), an Indonesian animated film
- Jumbo (magazine), a defunct Italian comic magazine

== Businesses ==
- Jumbo (supermarket), a Dutch supermarket chain
- Jumbo (hypermarket), a Chilean hypermarket
- Jumbo Video, a chain of video stores in Canada
- Jumbo Games, a European maker of games and puzzles
- Jumbo S.A., a Greek toy company
- Jumbo Shopping Centre, Vantaa, Finland
- Jumbo Records, a record label in Britain c. 1908–1918
- Jumbo Kingdom, floating restaurants in Hong Kong; closed in 2022
- Jumboking, a fast food chain in India

== Places ==
=== United States ===
- Jumbo, Alabama, an unincorporated community
- Jumbo, Arkansas, an unincorporated community
- Jumbo, Kentucky, an unincorporated community
- Jumbo, Ohio, an unincorporated community
- Jumbo, Oklahoma, an unincorporated community
- Jumbo, West Virginia, an unincorporated community
- Jumbo Mountain, a mountain in Washington State
- Jumbo Peak (Washington), a mountain in Washington State

=== Elsewhere ===
- Jumbo Glacier, British Columbia, Canada, aka Jumbo, a mountain resort municipality
- Jumbo Mountain (Canada), Purcell Mountains, Canada
- Jumbo Peak, in the Tararua Range, New Zealand
- Jumbo, Zimbabwe, a village
- Jumbo Cove, South Georgia Island

== Sports ==
- Jumbo formation, an offensive formation in American football
- Tufts Jumbos, the varsity intercollegiate athletic programs of Tufts University
  - Jumbo the Elephant, the official mascot of Tufts University

== Transportation ==
- Jumbo-class ferry, consisting of two ferries built by Washington State Ferries in 1972
- Boeing 747, aircraft manufactured by Boeing informally known as "Jumbo"
- Werkspoor Jumbo, a 1930s Dutch freighter biplane
- Glasflügel 604, a glider nicknamed "Jumbo" for its large size
- New South Wales 442 class locomotive, nicknamed "Jumbos" by railway enthusiasts
- Jumbo, a type of auto rickshaw in Laos
- Jumbo, name given to the only NZR WJ class steam locomotive

== People ==
- Jumbo (nickname)
- Cush Jumbo (born 1985), English actress and writer
- Oko Jumbo (died 1891), Nigerian traditional ruler
- Jumbo Tsuruta, ring name of Japanese professional wrestler Tomomi Tsuruta (1951–2000)
- Jumbo (actor), stage name of Dhallywood actor Babul Gomes (1944–2004)

== Other uses ==
- M4A3E2 Assault Tank or Jumbo, a variant of the US M4 Sherman tank
- "Jumbo", code-name of a steel canister constructed for the Trinity nuclear test
- Drilling jumbo, rock drilling machine used in underground mining and tunnelling
- Jumbo Water Tower, Colchester, England
- Jumbo frame, an Ethernet frame with more than 1500 bytes of payload
- Jumbo, a muscadine cultivar
- JuMBO, abbreviation for "Jupiter-mass Binary Objects" in the Orion Nebula
- Jumbo, Lyndon B. Johnson's nickname for his penis

== See also ==
- Mumbo jumbo (phrase), gibberish or a meaningless ritual
- Jumbo mortgage (United States), a mortgage loan in an amount above conventional conforming loan limits
- Airbus A380, "Super Jumbo", specifically
- Jumbo jet (disambiguation)
- Jumble (disambiguation)
