= KLM fleet =

List of aircraft operated by KLM

KLM operates a fleet of 128 aircraft. The narrow-body fleet consists of mostly Boeing 737 Next Generation aircraft which will be replaced by Airbus A320neo family aircraft. Airbus A330, Airbus A350, Boeing 777 and Boeing 787 Dreamliner wide-body aircraft are used on medium and long-haul flights. In September 2023, Air France-KLM announced an order for 50 Airbus A350 aircraft which will be shared between KLM and Air France to replace their aging Airbus A330 and Boeing 777-200ER aircraft.

== Current fleet ==
As of October 2026, KLM operates the following aircraft:

KLM fleet
Aircraft	In service	Orders	Passengers					Notes
Aircraft	In service	Orders	J	W	Y+	Y	Total	Notes
Airbus A321neo	18	15	30	—	6	191	227	Order with 60 options to be shared between KLM and its subsidiaries Transavia and Transavia France. Replacing Boeing 737 Next Generation. KLM dropped plans to operate A320neo in November 2026.
Airbus A330-200	5	—	18	—	36	210	264	To be retired and replaced by the Airbus A350-900.
Airbus A330-300	5	—	30	—	40	222	292	To be retired and replaced by the Airbus A350-900.
Airbus A350-900	1	21	34	26	33	238	331	Order with 40 options to be shared between KLM and Air France and delivered from 2026 to 2030. Replacing Airbus A330 and Boeing 777-200ER. It is confirmed through manufacturer order records the split will consist of 47 A350-900s and 3 A350-1000s, with 22 A350-900 allocated to KLM.
Boeing 737-700	6	—	20	—	6	106	132	To be retired and replaced by Airbus A320neo family.
Boeing 737-800	26	—	20	—	6	150	176	To be retired and replaced by Airbus A320neo family.
Boeing 737-900	5	—	20	—	30	132	182	To be retired and replaced by Airbus A320neo family.
Boeing 777-200ER	15	—	35	24	54	175	288	To be retired and replaced by Airbus A350-900.
Boeing 777-300ER	16	—	35	24	56	266	381	
Boeing 787-9	13	—	30	21	48	176	275	
Boeing 787-10	15	—	38	28	39	213	318	
KLM Cargo fleet
Airbus A350F	—	3	Cargo					Replacing Boeing 747-400ERF. To be operated by Martinair.
Boeing 747-400ERF	3	—	Cargo					
Boeing 747-400BCF	1	—	Cargo					To be retired and replaced by Airbus A350F. Operated by Martinair.
Total	128	48						

=== Gallery ===
KLM current fleet

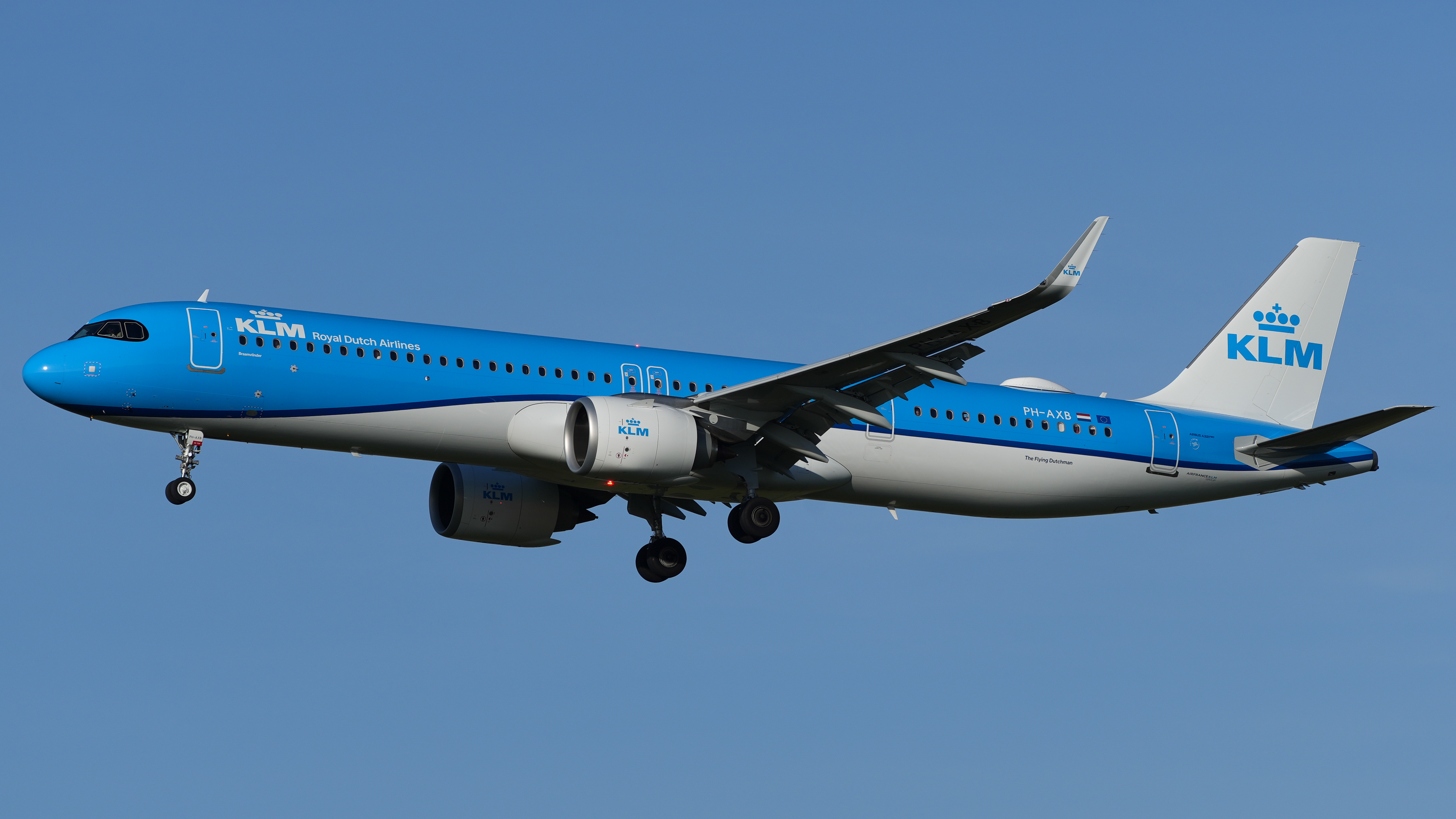
Airbus A321neo

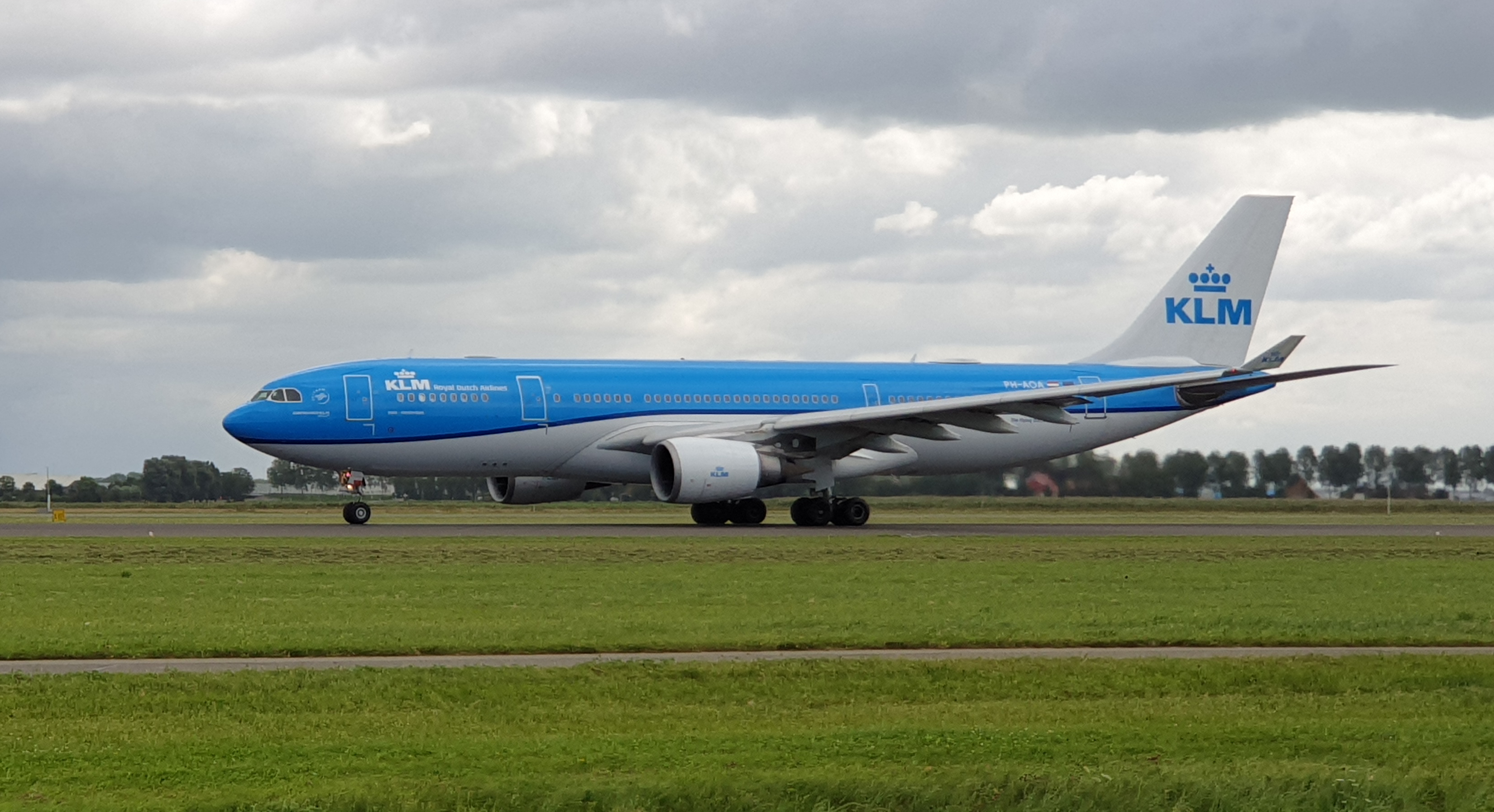
Airbus A330-200

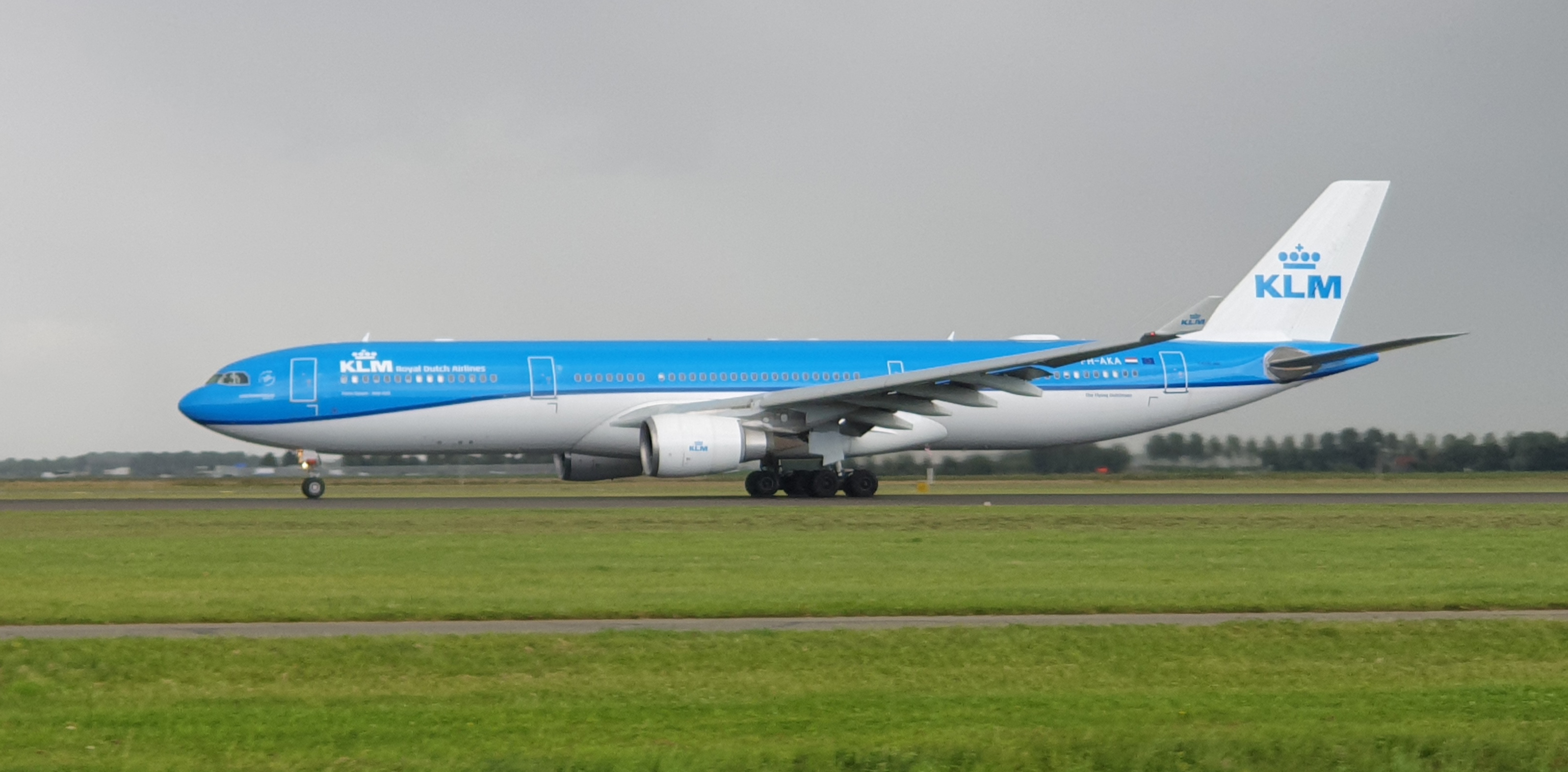
Airbus A330-300

Airbus A350-900

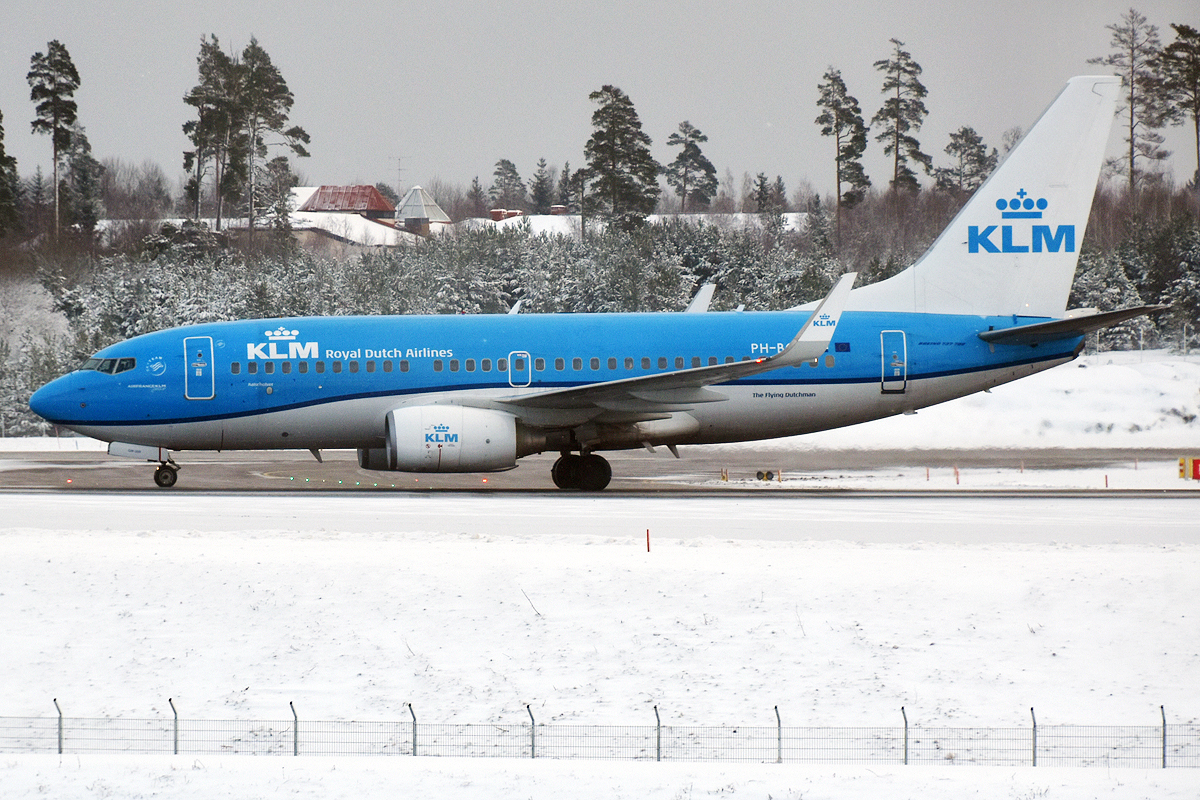
Boeing 737-700

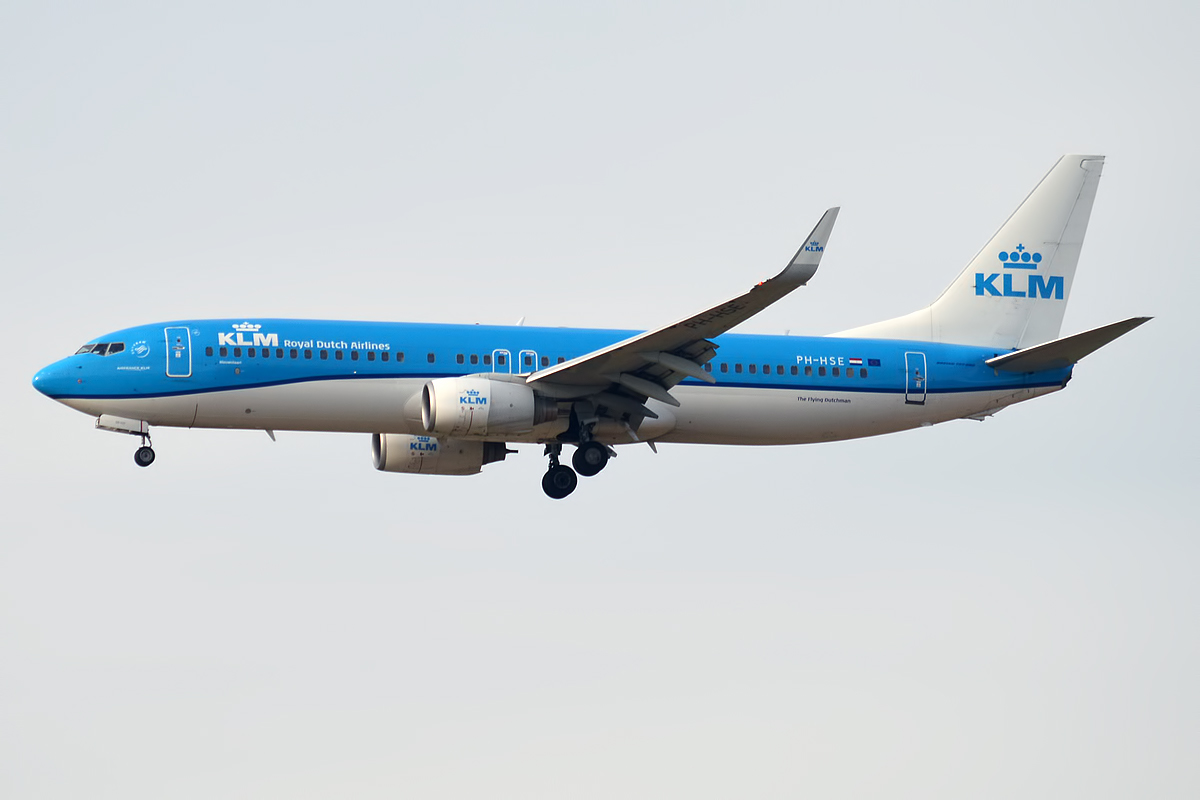
Boeing 737-800

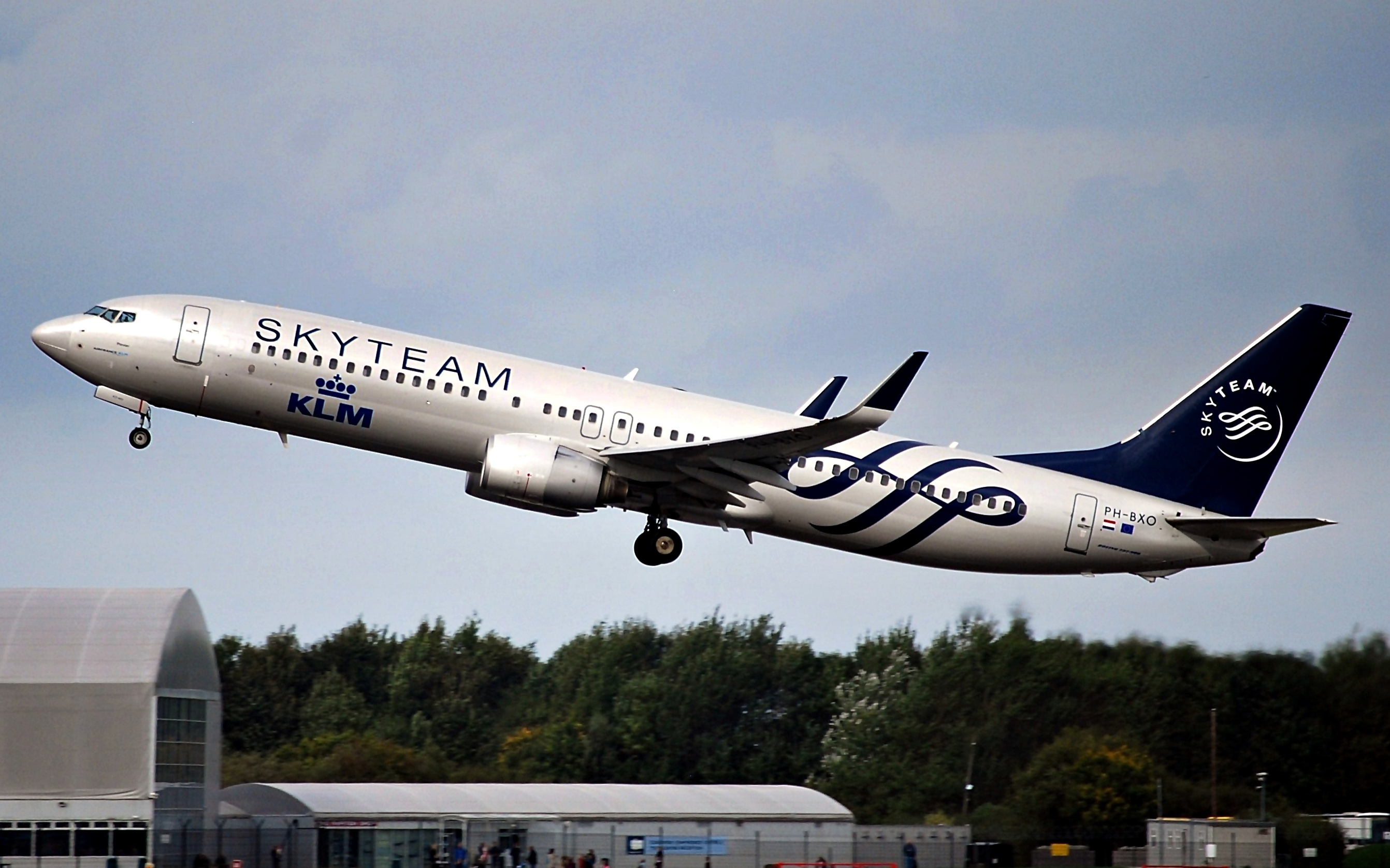
Boeing 737-900 in SkyTeam livery

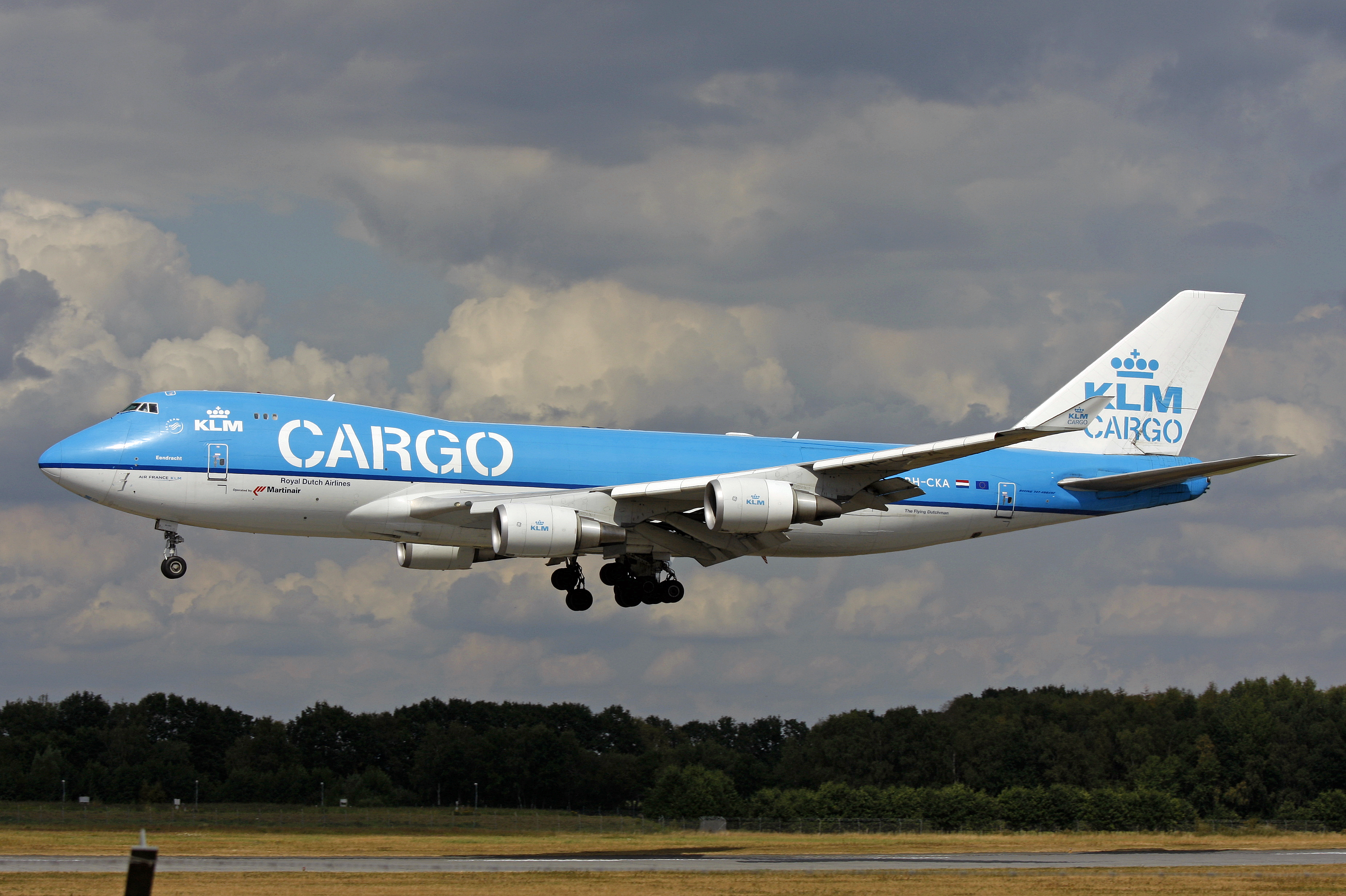
Boeing 747-400F

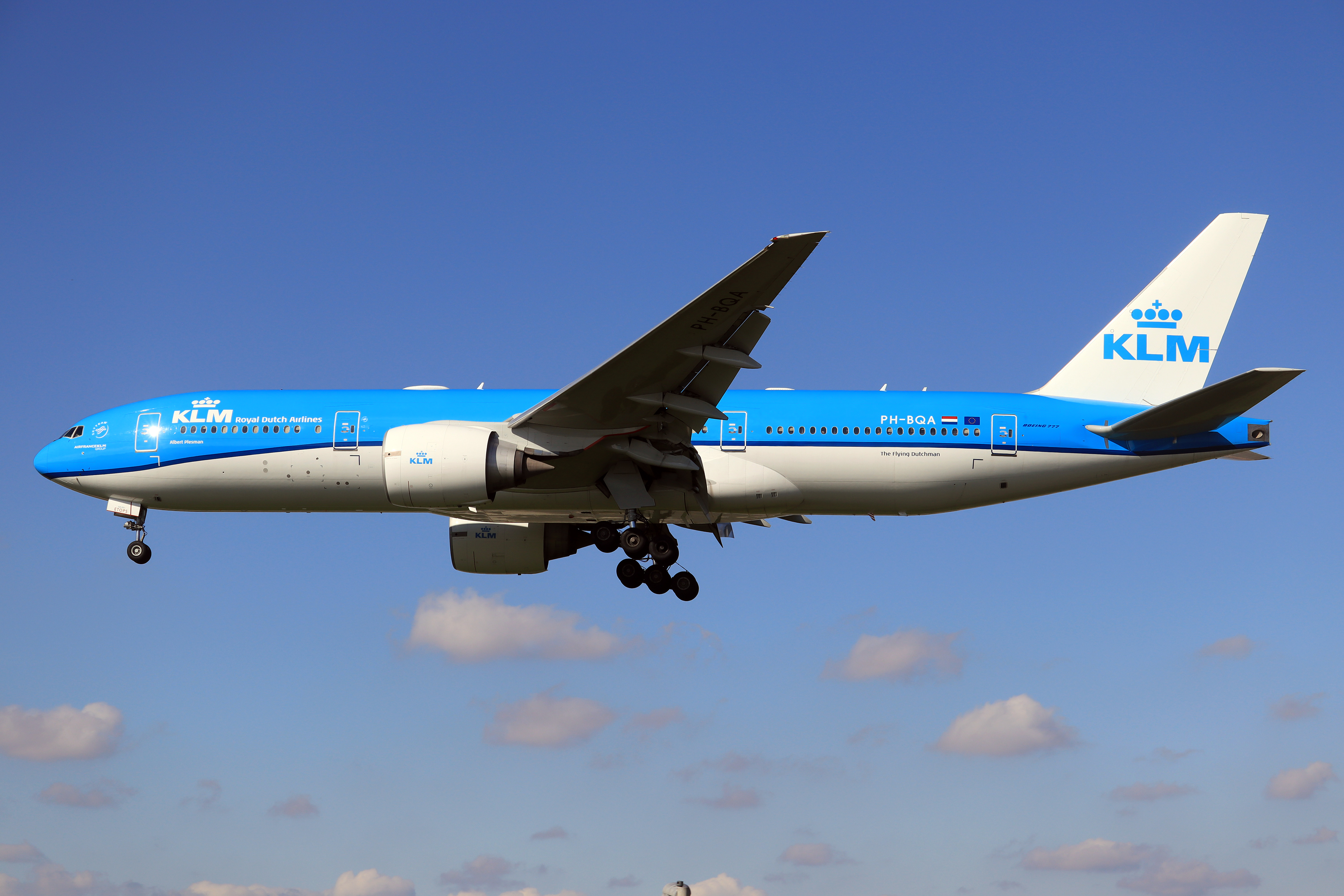
Boeing 777-200ER

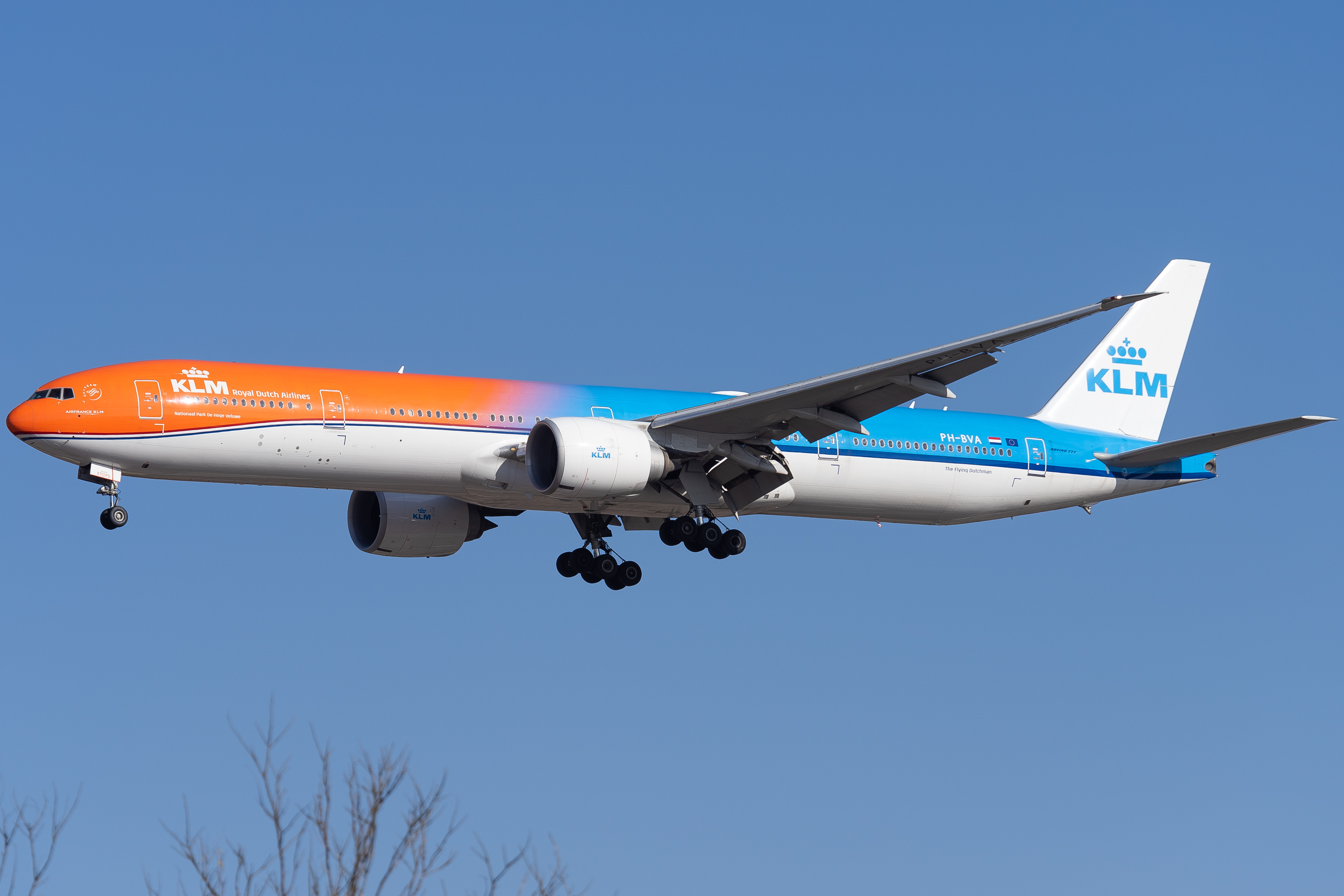
Boeing 777-300ER in special "Orange Pride" livery

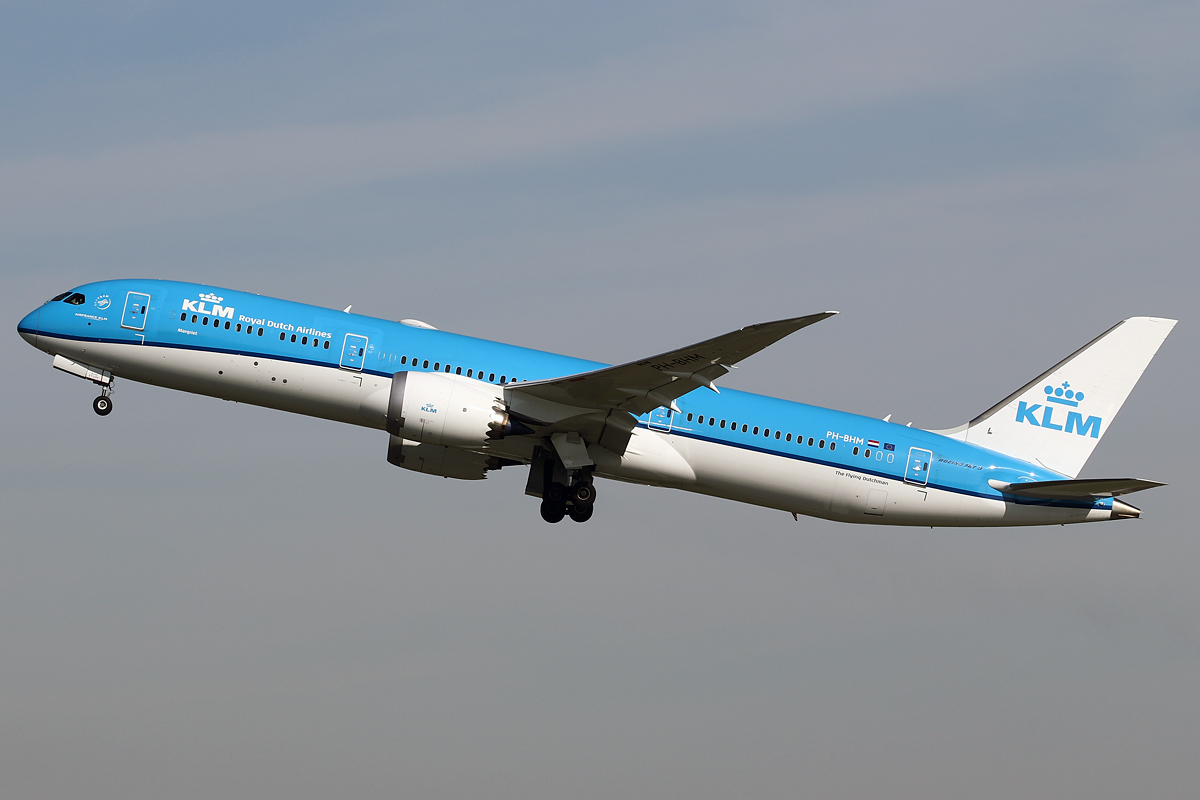
Boeing 787-9

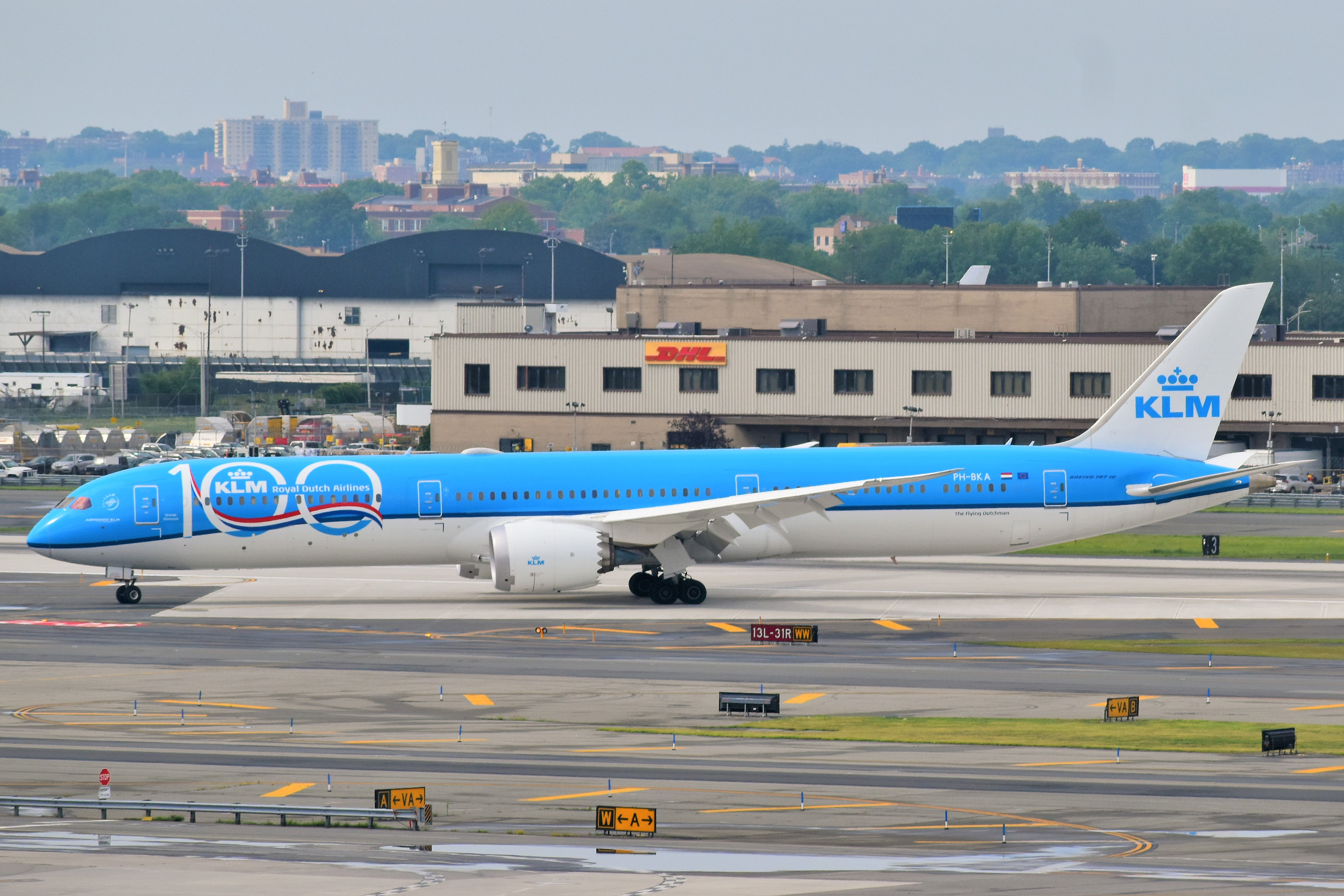
Boeing 787-10 in special centennial livery

== Historical fleet ==
Over the years, KLM has operated the following aircraft types:

KLM historical fleet
Aircraft	Total	Introduced	Retired	Notes	Ref
Airbus A310-200	10	1983	1997		
BAC 1-11-301AG	1	1968	1968	Leased from British Eagle.	
Boeing 737-200	3	1987	1995		
Boeing 737-300	19	1986	2011		
Boeing 737-400	19	1989	2011		
Boeing 747-200B	7	1971	1995	One crashed as Flight 4805	
Boeing 747-200M	7	1975	1986		
Boeing 747-200B/SUD	3	1985	2003		
Boeing 747-200M/SUD	7	1985	2003		
Boeing 747-200/SUD/SF	3	1998	2003		
Boeing 747-300M	3	1983	2003	Largest operator of its type along with Swissair and Singapore Airlines.	
Boeing 747-400	5	1989	2020		
Boeing 747-400M	17	1989	2021		
Boeing 767-300ER	12	1995	2007		
Carley Werkspoor Jumbo	1	1930	1940		
Convair CV-240	12	1948	1959		
Convair CV-340	12	1954	1963		
Convair CV-880	1	1963	1965	Leased and operated by Viasa. Painted in KLM livery on one side and Viasa livery on the other.	
de Havilland DH.9B	4	1921	1926		
de Havilland DH.16	4	1920	1924	Operated KLM's first flight. Leased from Aircraft Transport and Travel.	
de Havilland DH.89A Dragon Rapide	2	1945	1947		
de Havilland DH.89B Dominie	4	1945	1947		
Douglas C-47 Skytrain	49	1944	1965	Includes "A" and "B" variants.	
Douglas C-54 Skymaster	29	1945	1959		
Douglas DC-2	18	1934	1940		
Douglas DC-3	27	1936	1946		
Douglas DC-4	6	1946	1958		
Douglas DC-5	4	1940	1941	Transferred to KNILM due to World War II.	
Douglas DC-6	17	1948	1965		
Douglas DC-7	15	1957	1969		
Douglas DC-8-30	7	1960	1973		
Douglas DC-8-50	19	1961	1981	2 leased from Philippine Airlines.	
Douglas DC-8-60	11	1967	1985		
Douglas DC-9-15	6	1966	1989		
Douglas DC-9-30	19	1967	1989		
Fokker F.II	2	1920	1927		
Fokker F.III	14	1921	1930		
Fokker F.VII	30	1924	1940	Includes "F.VII", "F.VIIA" and "F.VIIB" variants.	
Fokker F.VIII	7	1927	1938		
Fokker F.IX	2	1930	1936		
Fokker F.XII	8	1931	1936		
Fokker F.XVIII	5	1932	1936		
Fokker F.XX	1	1933	1936		
Fokker F.XXII	3	1935	1939		
Fokker F.XXXVI	1	1934	1939		
Fokker 100	6	1989	1998 (Note: KLM Cityhopper and KLM UK also operated the Fokker 100, with the last being retired in 2012)		
Ilyushin Il-62	7	1971	1972	Joint operation with Aeroflot. Used for the Tokyo ~ Moscow ~ Amsterdam service.	
Koolhoven FK-33	1	1925	1927		
Koolhoven FK-40	1	1929	1936		
Koolhoven FK-43	9	1932	1940		
Koolhoven FK-48	1	1934	1940		
Lockheed L-049 Constellation	6	1946	1950		
Lockheed L-749 Constellation	20	1947	1959	Includes "A" variant.	
Lockheed L-1049 Super Constellation	22	1953	1965	Includes "C", "G", and "H" variants.	
Lockheed L-188C Electra	12	1959	1969		
Lockheed Super Electra-14	2	1938	1939		
McDonnell Douglas DC-10-30	12	1972	1995 (Note: PH-DTL was leased to African Safari Airways and was withdrawn in 1998, however never re-entered service with KLM)	3 aircraft were leased to other airlines and never entered service with KLM. Excludes 1 aircraft operated by Northwest Airlines with a hybrid KLM-Northwest Airlines livery between 1998 and 2000.	
McDonnell Douglas MD-11	10	1993	2014	Last commercial passenger operator.	
Stearman Hammond Y-1S	1	1937	1939		
Vickers Viscount 803	9	1957	1966		

=== Historical gallery ===
KLM former fleet examples

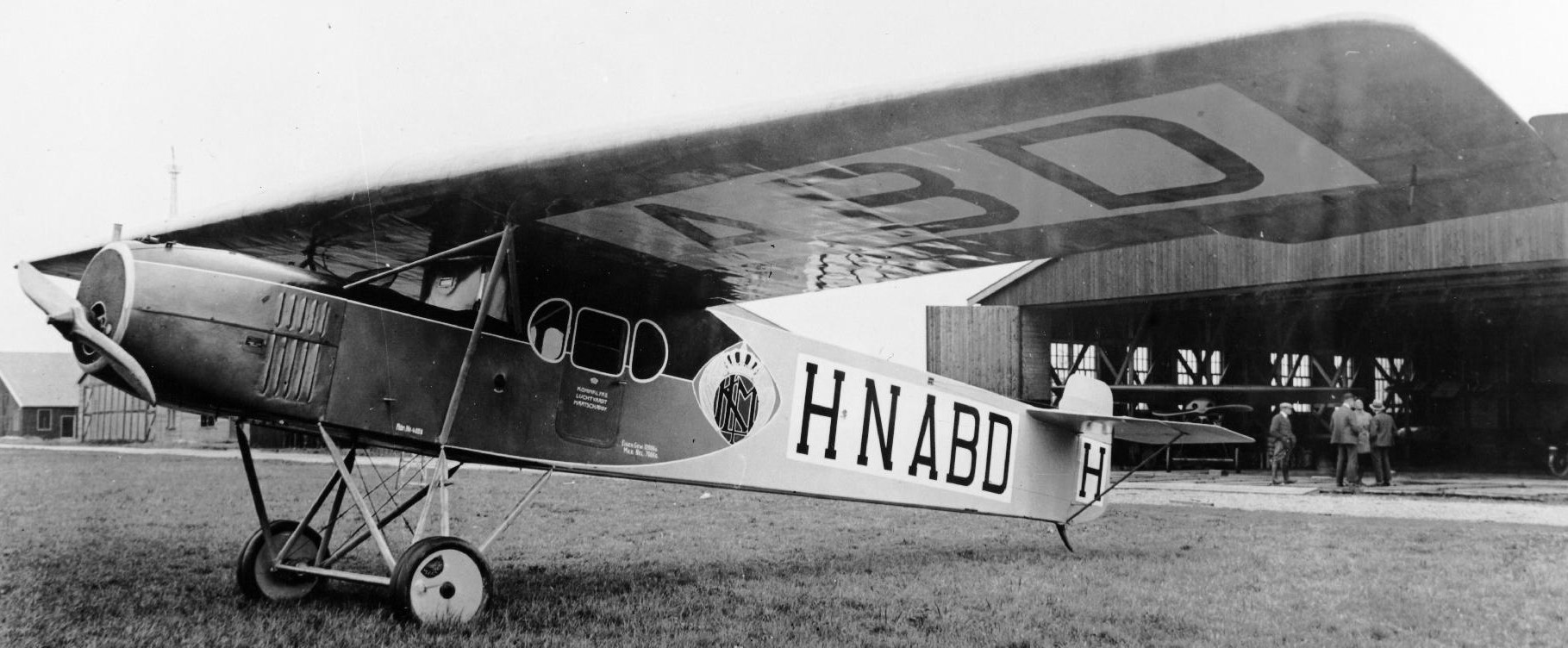
Fokker F.II in 1920

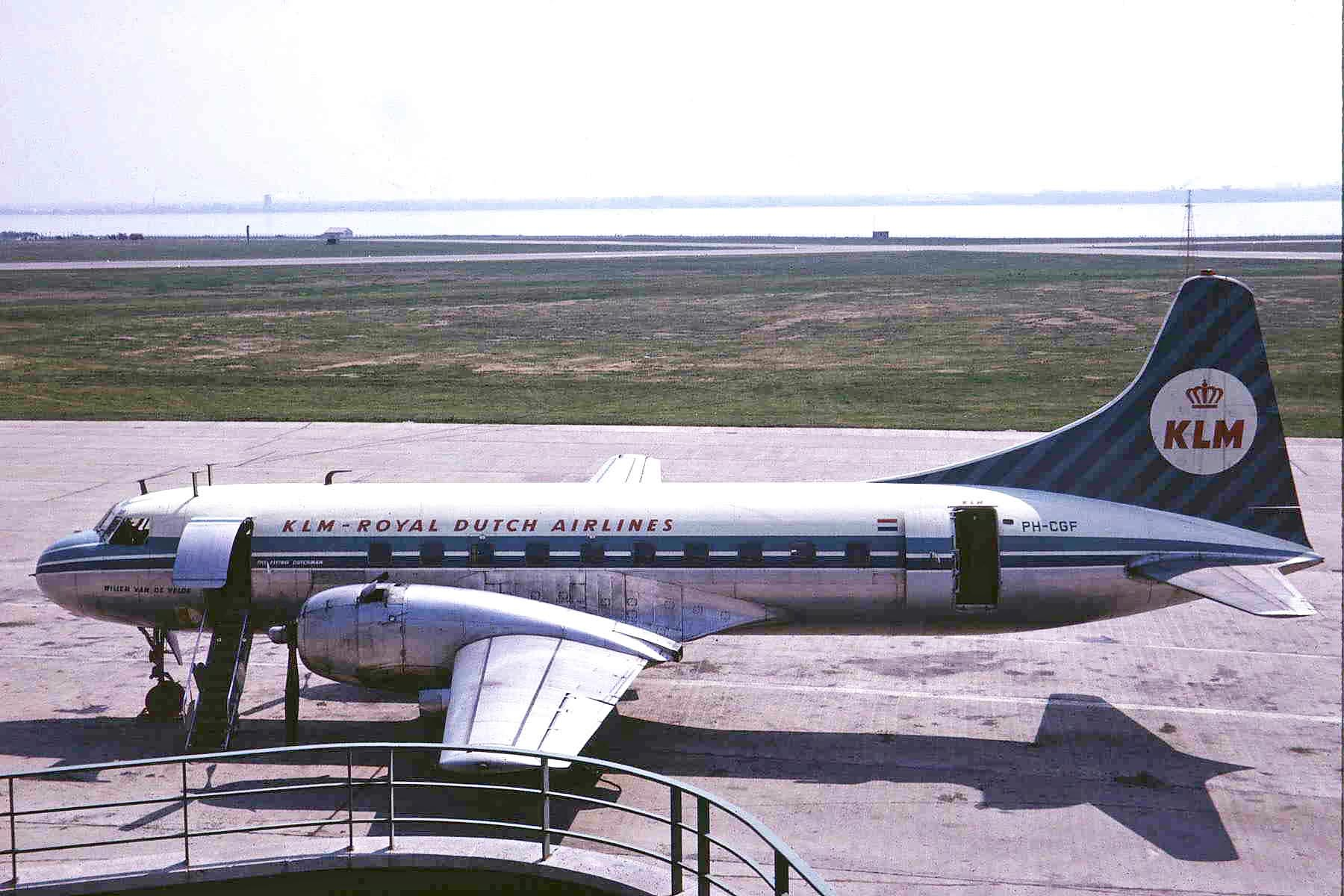
Convair CV-340 in 1963

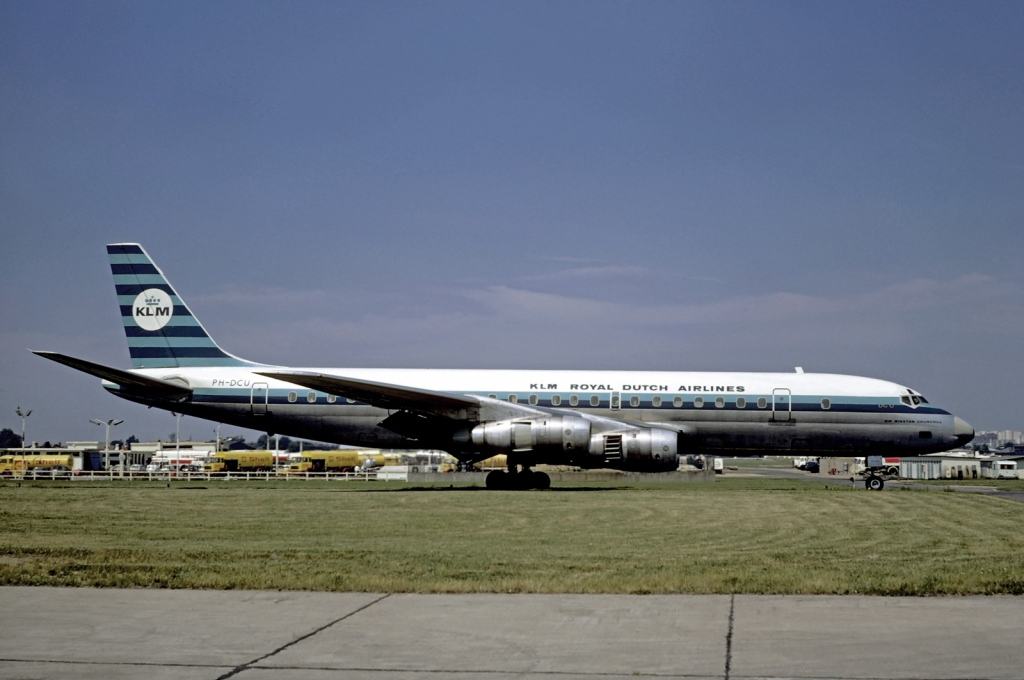
Douglas DC-8-55F in 1971

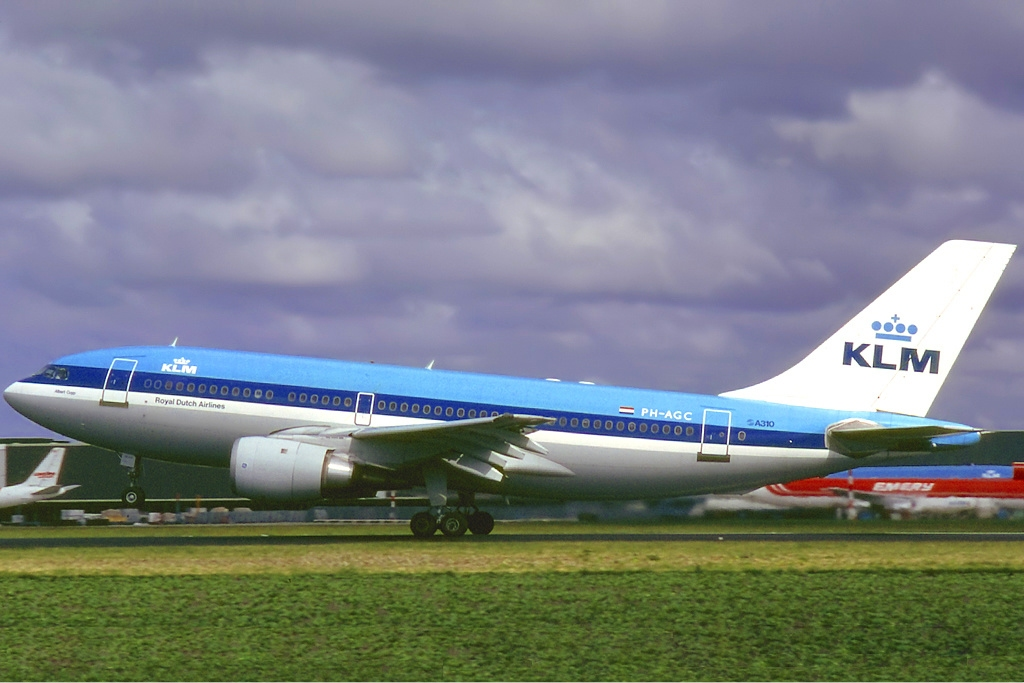
Airbus A310 in 1985

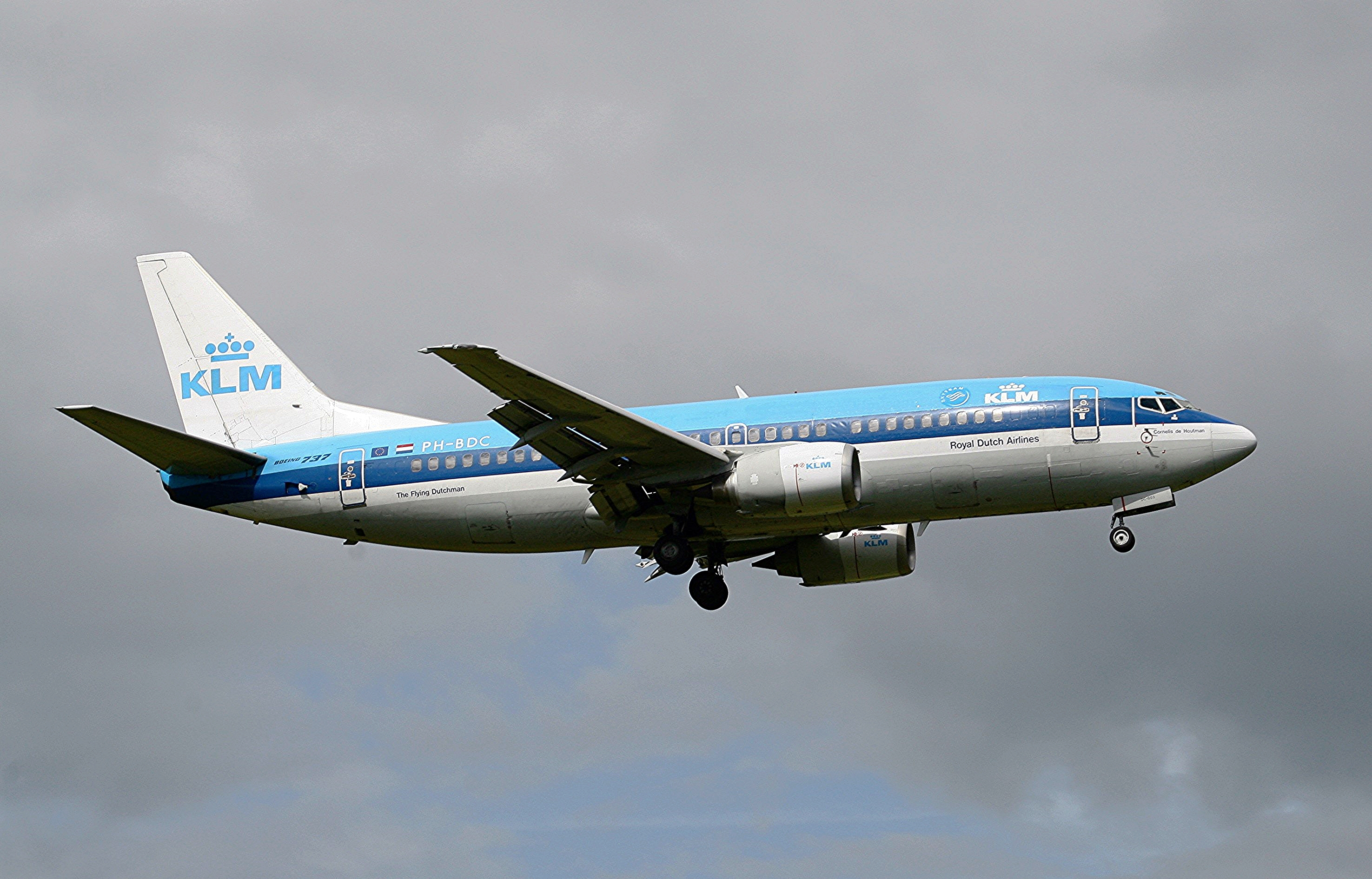
Boeing 737-300 in 2008

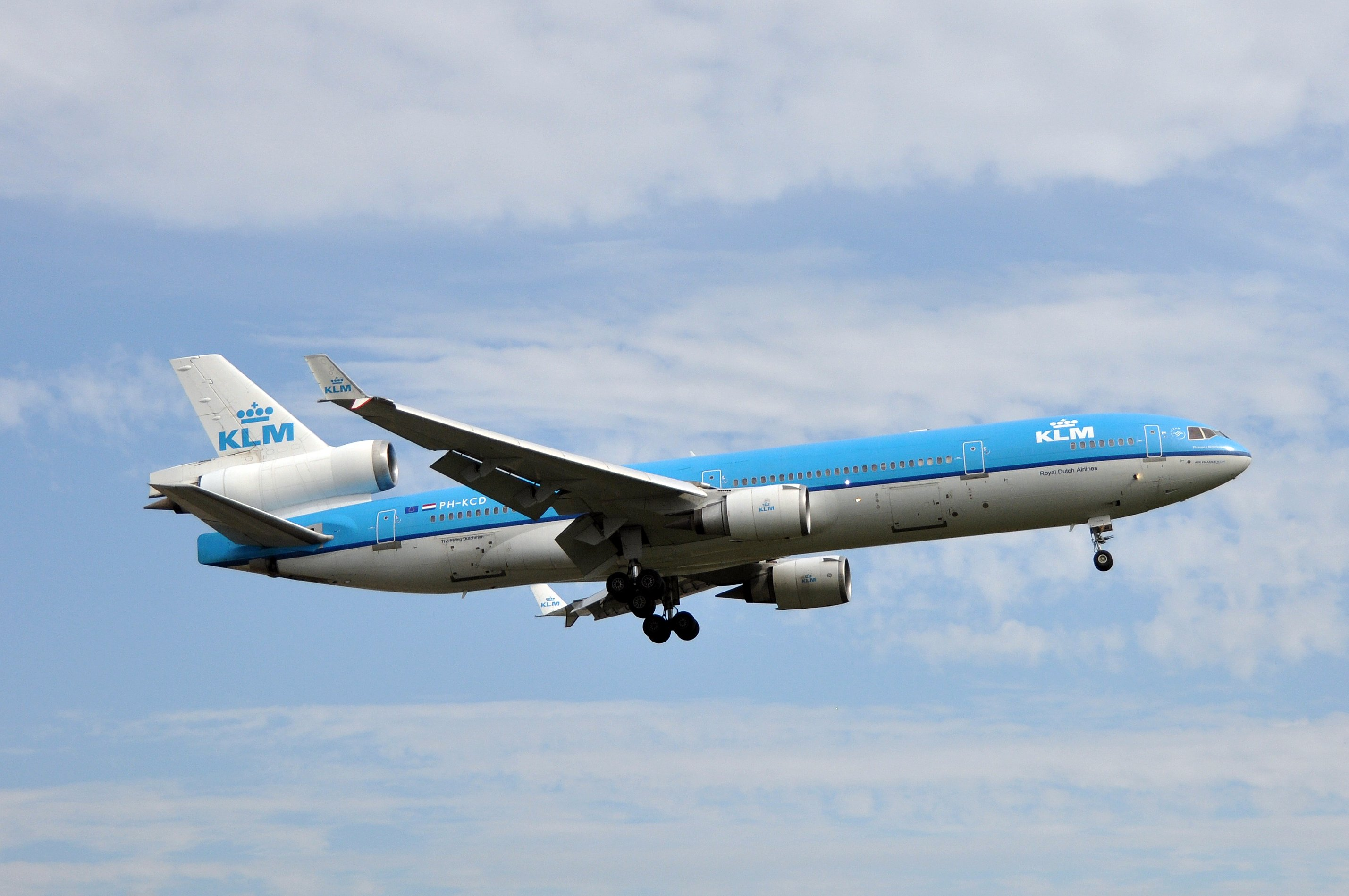
McDonnell Douglas MD-11 in 2009

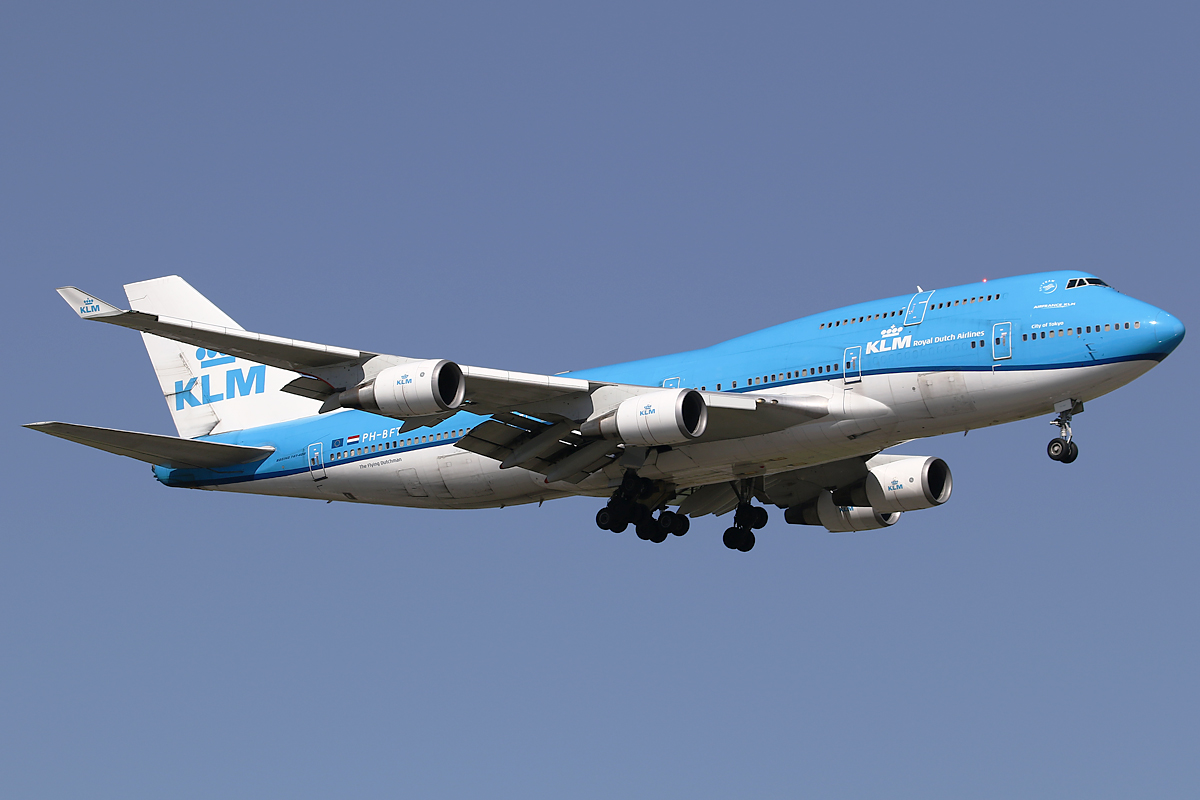
Boeing 747-400 in 2018

== Fleet development ==
=== Fleet strategy ===
KLM's first of eight Boeing 787-10 aircraft was delivered on 28 June 2019; it featured centennial markings.

CEO Ben Smith announced at Air France's Investor Day on 5 November 2019 in Paris that "in the near future", KLM would only use the Boeing 777 and 787 as their long and medium-haul fleet, respectively, after retiring their thirteen Airbus A330s. This move would have made KLM an all-Boeing carrier, however, KLM announced in December 2021 an order for 100 Airbus A320neo family aircraft which would be shared with Transavia and Transavia France. This order was to replace KLM's short-haul Boeing 737 fleet alongside Transavia's.

There was considerable speculation on the replacement of KLM’s aging 777 and A330 fleet, of which the oldest 777-200ERs dated back to 2003. On 23 August 2023, it was reported that contrary to speculation that KLM was considering Airbus A350 and Boeing 777X aircraft types, it would likely opt to further increase the number of Boeing 787 Dreamliners in the existing fleet. This was disproven when Air France–KLM placed an order for 50 Airbus A350s.

=== Special liveries ===
KLM has several aircraft painted in special liveries; they include:

- PH-BVA, a Boeing 777-300ER, features an orange forward fuselage that fades into the standard blue to commemorate the Netherlands national team's participation in the 2016 Summer Olympics in Rio de Janeiro.
- PH-KZU, a Fokker 70, has been applied with a special livery featuring Anthony Fokker, the founder of Fokker, commemorating the airline's long-standing history with Fokker aircraft and the phase-out of the Fokker 70 aircraft in October 2017.

== See also ==
- Air France fleet
- British Airways fleet
- Lufthansa fleet
