= Jumbo (nickname) =

Jumbo is a nickname which may refer to:

== People ==
=== Sports ===
==== Major League Baseball ====
- Jumbo Brown (1907–1966), American relief pitcher
- Jumbo Davis (1861–1921), American third baseman
- Jumbo Díaz (born 1984), Dominican relief pitcher
- Jumbo Elliott (baseball) (1900–1970), American pitcher
- Jumbo McGinnis (1854–1934), American pitcher
- Jumbo Schoeneck (1862–1930), American first baseman

==== Other sports ====
- Jumbo Elliott (American football) (born 1965), former National Football League player
- Jumbo Elliott (coach) (1915–1981), American track and field coach
- Anil Kumble (born 1970), Indian Test cricket captain
- Jumbo Milton (1885–1915), South African-born international rugby union player for England
- Masashi Ozaki (born 1947), Japanese golfer
- Jumbo Reason (1884–?), English footballer
- Joe Thornton (born 1979), Canadian National Hockey League player

=== Others ===
- Al Hirt (1922–1999), American trumpeter and bandleader
- Henry Maitland Wilson (1881–1964), British Army field marshal
- Lyndon B. Johnson (1908-1973), 36th president of the United States

== Fictional characters ==
- Alfie "Jumbo" Johnson, the titular character in the British comic General Jumbo
- Takashi "Jumbo" Takeda, from the Japanese manga comic Yotsuba&!

== See also ==
- Jumbo (disambiguation)
