= Jumbo jet (disambiguation) =

Jumbo jet most commonly refers to:

- Wide-body aircraft
  - Boeing 747 originally and specifically

Jumbo Jet may also refer to:

== Roller coasters ==
- Jumbo Jet (Cedar Point), a roller coaster formerly at Cedar Point amusement park.
- Jumbo Jet (Six Flags Great Adventure), a roller coaster formerly at Six Flags Great Adventure amusement park.
- Jumbo Jet (Morey's Piers), a roller coaster formerly at Morey's Piers amusement park.

== See also ==
- Jumbo (disambiguation)
- Jet (disambiguation)
- Airbus A380, "Super Jumbo Jet", specifically
- Boeing 777, "Mini Jumbo Jet", specifically
