= Sun Peaks, British Columbia =

Village in British Columbia, Canada

Sun Peaks is a village in British Columbia, Canada. It was incorporated on June 28, 2010. It is built around Sun Peaks Resort. It is located 55 kilometres (34 mi) northeast of Kamloops and 410 km (250 mi) from Vancouver. The village has a resident population of 1,404 people, with more than 900 additional non-resident property owners.

== Demographics ==
In the 2021 Census of Population conducted by Statistics Canada, Sun Peaks Mountain had a population of 1,404 living in 622 of its 1,506 total private dwellings, a change of 127.9% from its 2016 population of 616. With a land area of 40.85 km^{2} (15.77 sq mi), it had a population density of 34.4/km^{2} (89.0/sq mi) in 2021.

=== Religion ===
According to the 2021 census, religious groups in Sun Peaks included:

- Irreligion (960 persons or 69.6%)
- Christianity (370 persons or 26.8%)

== See also ==
- Jumbo Glacier, British Columbia, once incorporated as a mountain resort municipality
- List of communities in British Columbia
- List of municipalities in British Columbia
