= Bucentaur Rock =

Rock near South Georgia Island

Geography
- Coordinates: 54°9′S 36°33′W
- Archipelago: South Georgia and the South Sandwich Islands

Administration
- British Antarctic Territory

Demographics
- Population: 0

Bucentaur Rock (54°9′S 36°33′W) is the outermost of three rocks lying close northeast of Busen Point, at the southeast side of the entrance to Stromness Bay, South Georgia. The name Low Rock was given for this feature during a survey in 1927, but this name is used elsewhere in the Antarctic. Following the survey by the South Georgia Survey, 1951–52, the feature was renamed Bucentaur Rock after the floating factory Bucentaur, which was anchored at Husvik in the early years of the whaling station after 1907, and from which the Husvik transport Busen and the catchers Busen I, II, III, etc., derive their names.

== See also ==
- South Georgia and the South Sandwich Islands
