= Jumbo Glacier, British Columbia =

Jumbo Glacier
- Former mountain resort municipality
- Jumbo Glacier Mountain Resort Municipality
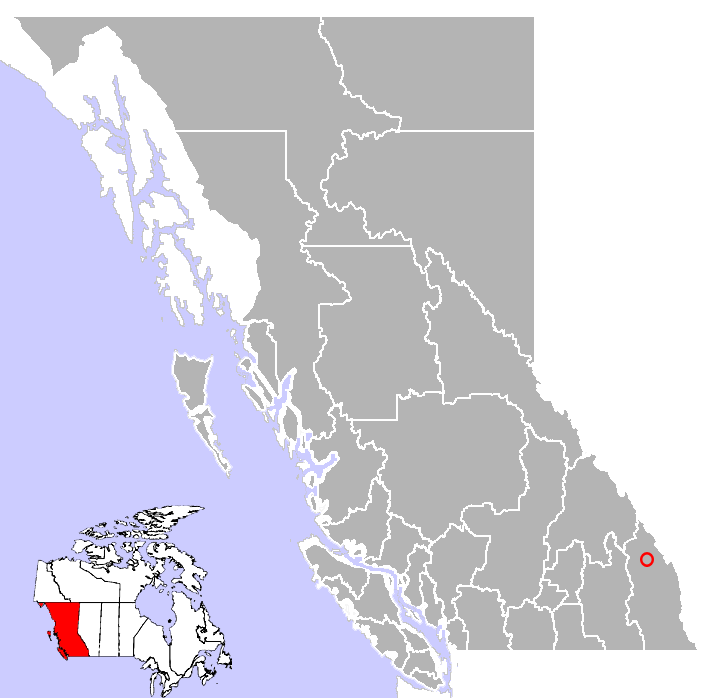
- Location of Jumbo Glacier, British Columbia
- Coordinates: 50°24′30″N 116°34′00″W
- Country: Canada
- Province: British Columbia
- Region: East Kootenay
- Incorporated: February 19, 2013
- Dissolved: December 13, 2021

Government
  - MP: Wayne Stetski
  - MLA: Norm Macdonald
- Elevation: 1,700 m (5,600 ft)
- Time zone: UTC-7 (Mountain Standard (MST))
  - Summer (DST): UTC-6 (Mountain Daylight (MDT))
- Waterways: Jumbo Creek
- Website: Official website

Jumbo Glacier, also known as Jumbo, was a mountain resort municipality within the Regional District of East Kootenay in southeast British Columbia, Canada between 2013 and 2021. It was approximately 55 km (34 mi) west of Invermere near the Commander Glacier and around the headwaters of Jumbo Creek in the Purcell Range of the Columbia Mountains.

Jumbo Glacier was planned to be a year-round skiing mountain resort developed in three phases at an estimated cost of $450 million. The future resort development had been the subject of controversy as a result of public opposition from the residents of the region, the Lower Kootenay First Nation and the Sinixt Nation for political, economic, and environmental reasons. It was the subject of the documentary, Jumbo Wild, by Patagonia and Sweetgrass Productions.

In January 2020, a plan to designate the area as an Indigenous Protected and Conserved Area was revealed instead and the remaining interest of the company formed to develop the ski resort was bought out, ultimately cancelling the development of the resort. The Government of British Columbia dissolved the Jumbo Glacier Mountain Resort Municipality on December 13, 2021.

== History ==
Jumbo Mountain and its glacier were named after a mining claim established on nearby Toby Creek in 1890. The stakeholders hoped it would be a large, productive mine, and named it after Jumbo, P. T. Barnum's popular performing elephant. Although the mine was productive for several years, it did not last into the 20th century.

The idea of developing a recreational resort in the Jumbo Valley was first presented to the British Columbia government in 1990 by a consortium of investors called Glacier Resorts Ltd. In 1993, the proposal was approved for further consultation and review, including preparation of environmental impact assessments. These were not completed until 2004. The same year, representatives from the Ktunaxa Nation went public with concerns about the proposal, specifically about its impact on grizzly bears and other wildlife. Opposition to the project grew, resulting in a 2010 protest in Victoria, the provincial capital. The proposal process continued, and over the next two years final approvals were granted. Letters patent to incorporate Jumbo Glacier as a municipality was approved by order in council on November 19, 2012. Its formal date of incorporation was February 19, 2013. The letters patent were revoked on December 13, 2021, dissolving the Jumbo Glacier Mountain Resort Municipality.

== Government ==
The Government of British Columbia appointed Jumbo Glacier's first municipal council for a term beginning February 19, 2013, its official incorporation date, and ending November 30, 2014, at which point local governance will align with the province's general municipal election cycle. Despite not yet having any residents, the first municipal council consisted of a mayor, Greg Deck of Radium Hot Springs, and two councillors, Nancy Hugunin of Fairmont Hot Springs and Steve Ostrander of Invermere. Phil Taylor of Golden was appointed the municipality's interim chief officer to serve in advance of the official incorporation date until the first municipal council meeting.

== Proposed development ==
The approved resort proposal would have involved over $450 million in new construction and a major new road into the remote area. Pheidias Project Management Corporation of Vancouver headed the development plans. The new resort was planned to include 1,360 residential units, two hotels, 23 lifts and gondolas, and a village centre with retail stores and amenities. Construction was planned to be completed by 2015, but the environmental assessment certificate expired before construction had begun.

== See also ==
- Jumbo (disambiguation)
- List of communities in British Columbia
- List of municipalities in British Columbia
- Sun Peaks, British Columbia, the only other community incorporated "mountain resort municipality" in the province
