= Busen Point =

Headland on South Georgia

Busen Point or Busen Peninsula (54°9′S 36°33′W) is a headland forming the southeast side of the entrance to Stromness Bay, on the north coast of South Georgia island. It lies on the Lewin Peninsula in between Stromness Bay and Cumberland West Bay.

The name Busen was first used on charts based on the 1927–29 survey by Discovery Investigations personnel but the point was discovered at a much earlier date. It was named for the head of Husvik Harbour in Stromness Bay.

The peninsula between Stromness Bay and Cumberland West Bay, on which Busen Point is found, was named the Lewin Peninsula by the Antarctic Placenames Committee after Terence Lewin, Baron Lewin, who was Chief of Defence Staff and instrumental in directing the campaign to retake South Georgia following the Argentine invasion in 1982.

Three notable rocks lie close to the northeast of Busen Point of which the outermost is Bucentaur Rock.

== See also ==
- Jumbo Cove
- Justa Peak
