= Justa Peak =

Mountain peak in South Georgia

Justa Peak (54°10′S 36°34′W) is a peak, 495 metres (1,620 ft) high, lying southwest of Busen Point on the north coast of South Georgia. The name appears to be first used on a 1929 British Admiralty chart.
