= British Airways fleet =

Aircraft operated by British Airways

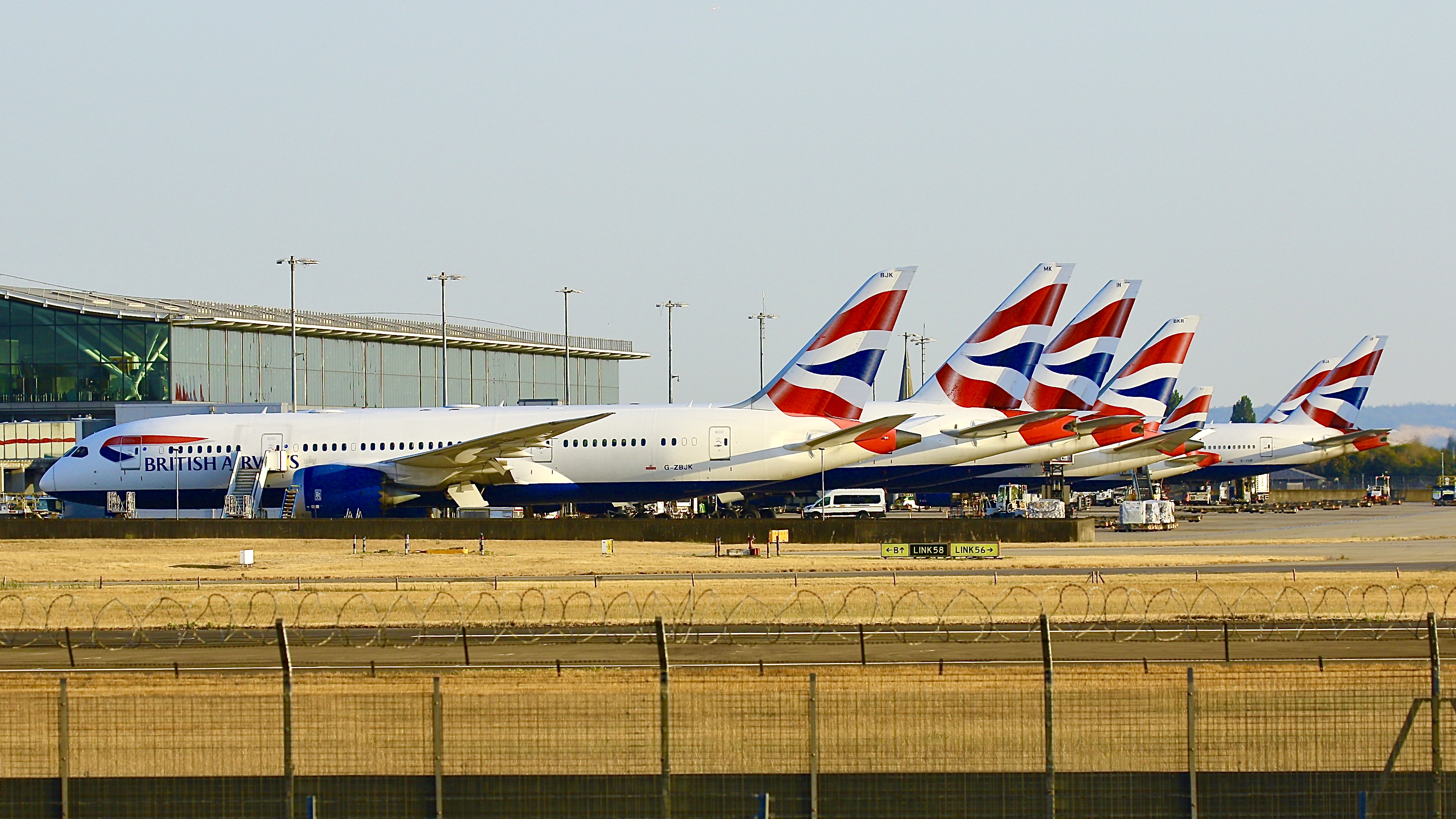
British Airways widebody fleet parked at Heathrow Airport in 2026, including the Boeing 777-200ER and Boeing 787 Dreamliner in this picture

British Airways operates a fleet of Airbus and Boeing aircraft. It operates a single-aisle fleet of Airbus A320 family aircraft. It also operates a twin-aisle fleet of Airbus A350, Airbus A380, Boeing 777, and Boeing 787 aircraft.

== Current fleet ==
=== Passenger fleet ===
As of October 2025, British Airways operates the following mainline aircraft:

British Airways fleet
Aircraft	In service	Orders	Passengers					Notes
Aircraft	In service	Orders	F	J	W	Y	Total	Notes
Airbus A319-100	23	—	—	40	—	83	123	One aircraft (G-EUPJ) is painted in a retro BEA livery, as this was to celebrate the centenary of British Airways and still remains painted to this day.
Airbus A320-200	47	—	—	48	—	108	156	Three aircraft (G-EUYP/R/S) are painted in Oneworld livery.
Airbus A320neo	36	4	—	48	—	108	156	IAG ordered a further 26 A320neos which have not yet been allocated to a specific airline within the IAG group.
Airbus A321neo	20	2	—	56	—	136	192	IAG ordered a further 23 A321neos which have not yet been allocated to a specific airline within the IAG group.
Airbus A350-1000	18	6	—	56	56	219	331	Delivered with Club Suites. Order with 12 options.
Airbus A380-800	12	—	14	97	55	303	469	Older Club World seats. To be retrofitted with all-new seating classes by late 2026.
Boeing 777-200ER	43	—	8	49	40	138	235	Heathrow configuration with new interior configuration with Club Suites.
Boeing 777-200ER	43	—	—	48	40	184	272	Heathrow configuration with new interior configuration with Club Suites.
Boeing 777-200ER	43	—	—	32	48	252	332	Launch customer. Gatwick configuration with older Club World seats.To be retired and replaced by the Boeing 787-10 Dreamliner.
Boeing 777-200ER	43	—	—	32	52	252	336	Launch customer. Gatwick configuration with older Club World seats.To be retired and replaced by the Boeing 787-10 Dreamliner.
Boeing 777-300ER	16	—	8	76	40	132	258	All with Club Suites.
Boeing 777-9	—	24	8	65	46	206	325	Order with 18 options.
Boeing 787-8	12	—	—	31	37	136	204	Retrofitted Club Suites.
Boeing 787-9	18	—	8	37	39	130	215	Retrofitted Club Suites.
Boeing 787-9	18	—	8	42	39	127	216	Older Club World seats.
Boeing 787-10	14	36	8	48	35	165	256	Delivered with Club Suites. Order with 16 options.Part of order to replace the older Boeing 777-200ER at Gatwick.
Total	254	74						

=== Cargo fleet ===
IAG's cargo division, IAG Cargo, handles cargo operations using capacity on British Airways' passenger aircraft. IAG reached an agreement with Qatar Airways in 2014 to operate flights for IAG Cargo using Boeing 777F aircraft owned by Qatar Airways Cargo.

British Airways World Cargo was the airline's freight division before its merger with Iberia Cargo to form IAG Cargo. Aircraft types used by the division between 1974 and 1983 were Vickers 953C, Boeing 707-300C and Boeing 747-200F. The Boeing 747-400F was operated from the 1990s to 2001 through Atlas Air and from 2002 to early 2012 by Global Supply Systems; of these, only one of Atlas Air's aircraft wore BA livery, the others flew in Atlas and Global Supply's own colours. From 2012 until Global Supply System's contract terminated in 2014, three Boeing 747-8F aircraft were flown for British Airways World Cargo.

=== Gallery ===
Airbus A319-100

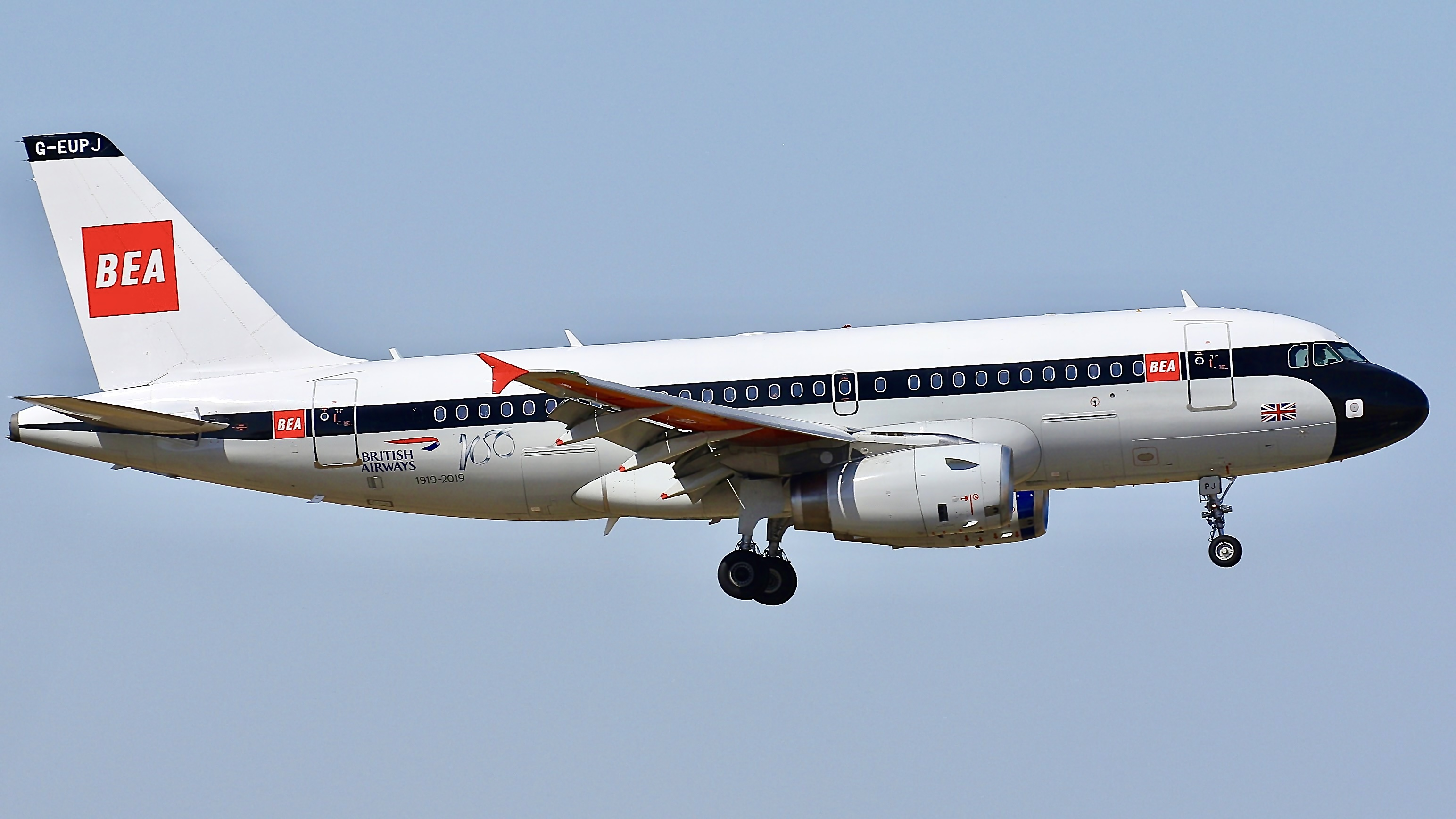
Airbus A319-100 in BEA retro livery

Airbus A320-200

Airbus A320-200 in Oneworld Alliance Livery

Airbus A320neo

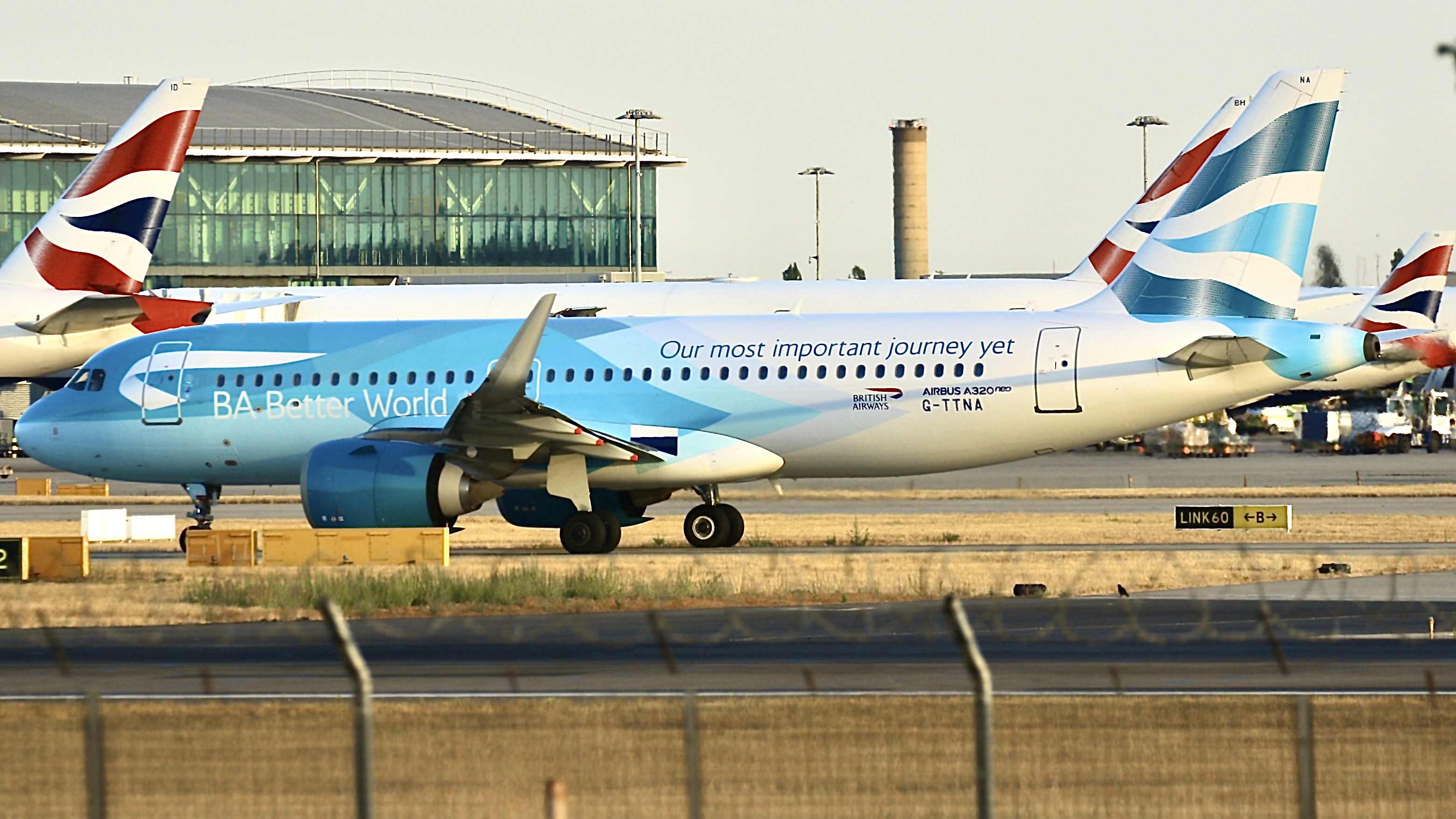
Airbus A320neo in BA Better World livery

Airbus A321neo

Airbus A350-1000

Airbus A380-800

Boeing 777-200ER

Boeing 777-200ER in Oneworld Alliance Livery

Boeing 777-300ER

Boeing 787-8

Boeing 787-9

Boeing 787-10

== Order history ==
Except for the Boeing 707 and early Boeing 747 variants from BOAC, British Airways inherited a mainly UK-built fleet of aircraft when it was formed in 1974. The airline introduced the Boeing 737 and Boeing 757 into the fleet in the 1980s, followed by the Boeing 747-400, Boeing 767 and Boeing 777 in the 1990s. BA was the largest Boeing 747-400 operator, with 57 in its fleet. Before the introduction of the 787, when Boeing built an aircraft for British Airways, it was allocated the customer code 36, which appeared in their aircraft designation as a suffix, such as 777-236.

In 1991, British Airways placed its first order for Boeing 777-200 aircraft, ordering another four for fleet expansion in 2007 at a cost of around US$800 million. BA's first 777s were fitted with General Electric GE90 engines. Still, BA switched to Rolls-Royce Trent 800s for subsequent aircraft.

Later in 2007, British Airways announced their order of 36 new long-haul aircraft, including 12 Airbus A380s and 24 Boeing 787 Dreamliners. Rolls-Royce Trent engines were again selected for both orders with Trent 900s powering the A380s and Trent 1000s powering the 787s. The Boeing 787s were scheduled to replace 14 of BA's Boeing 767s, while the Airbus A380s were planned to replace 20 of BA's Boeing 747-400s.

On 1 August 2008, British Airways announced orders for 6 Boeing 777-300ERs and options for four more as an interim measure to cover for delays over the deliveries of their 787s. Of the six that have been ordered, four will be leased and BA will fully acquire two.

On 22 April 2013, British Airways parent International Airlines Group (IAG) confirmed that it had signed a memorandum of understanding to order 18 Airbus A350-1000 XWB aircraft for BA, with an option for a further 18. The aircraft would replace some of the airline's fleet of Boeing 747-400s. Options for 18 Boeing 787 aircraft, part of the original contract signed in 2007 providing a total of 28 options, have been converted into firm orders for delivery between 2017 and 2021, leaving only 10 options left to be firmed.

On 26 June 2013, British Airways took delivery of its first Boeing 787 Dreamliner. The aircraft began operations in Toronto on 1 September 2013 and began service to Newark on 1 October 2013. BA's first A380 was delivered on 4 July 2013. It began regular services to Los Angeles on 24 September 2013, followed by Hong Kong on 22 October 2013.

On 28 February 2019, IAG ordered up to 42 Boeing 777-9 aircraft for British Airways, 18 firm orders with 24 options, valued at up to $18.6 billion (~$23.1 billion in 2025), to replace BA's 747-400s.

At the 2019 Paris Air Show, IAG signed a letter of intent to purchase 200 Boeing 737 MAX aircraft, despite the type still being grounded worldwide at the time.

In July 2019, the British carrier took delivery of its first Airbus A350-1000 XWB aircraft, fitted without First, but with more of the new Club Suites.

On 16 July 2020, British Airways announced it was immediately retiring their remaining Airbus A318-100 and Boeing 747-400 aircraft, the last of the latter having flown the previous month. BA had originally intended to phase out the last remaining 747 aircraft by 2024, but pushed the plans behind, in part due to the downturn in air travel following COVID-19 pandemic, and to focus on replacing the 747 with the more fuel-efficient Airbus A350, Airbus A380 and Boeing 787.

On 27 October 2022, IAG ordered an additional 37 Airbus A320neo aircraft (in addition to an earlier order), taking the total order to 59. The aircraft (a mix of A320neo and A321neo) will support British Airways' ongoing replacement of its remaining legacy A320ceo fleet delivered from the late 1990s to the early 2000s, including the eventual retirement of all A319 aircraft, as well as A320ceo family aircraft that were inherited as part of the 2012 takeover of British Midland International.

On 28 July 2023, IAG converted six of the ten remaining options for the Boeing 787 into firm orders for the 787-10 and added six more options for the variant to be allocated to British Airways, and converted one option for the Airbus A350-900 into a firm order to be allocated to Iberia.

On 9 May 2025, IAG ordered up to 76 aircraft from Airbus and Boeing, out of which 32 firm orders and 10 options for the Boeing 787-10 will be allocated to British Airways, and 21 firm orders and 13 options for the Airbus A330-900 will be allocated to Aer Lingus, Iberia and LEVEL. It also revealed the firming of options for 18 additional aircraft, including six Airbus A350-1000 aircraft and six Boeing 777-9 aircraft for British Airways, and six Airbus A350-900 aircraft for Iberia.

== Former fleet ==
Aircraft	Total	Introduced	Retired	Notes	Refs
Airbus A318-100	2	2009	2020	Operated BA1/BA2 and formerly also BA3/BA4 'Baby Bus' service between London–City and New York–JFK.	
Airbus A320-100	5	1988	2007	Ordered by British Caledonian, which merged into BA in 1988.	
Boeing 747-100	17	1974	1999		(Note: Inherited from BOAC)
Boeing 747-100	1	1974	1999	Nose of G-AWNG display at Hiller Aviation Museum, California (not in BA colours).	(Note: Inherited from BOAC)
Boeing 747-100	1	1974	1990	Written off as flight BA149.	(Note: Inherited from BOAC)
Boeing 747-200	24	1977	2002	First 747-200 to be powered with Rolls-Royce RB211-524B engines.	
Boeing 747-200	1	1977	2002	G-BDXJ preserved at Dunsfold Aerodrome (not in BA colours).	
Boeing 747-400	57	1989	2020	First 747-400 to be powered with Rolls-Royce RB211-524G engines. Replaced by Airbus A350-1000, Airbus A380 and Boeing 777-300ER.	
Boeing 747-400	57	1989	2020	G-CIVW wearing the standard Chatham Dockyard livery is preserved at Dunsfold Aerodrome.	
Boeing 747-400	57	1989	2020	G-BNLY wearing the Landor livery is preserved at Dunsfold Aerodrome.	
Boeing 747-400	57	1989	2020	G-CIVB wearing the Negus livery is preserved at Cotswold Airport.	
Boeing 747-400	57	1989	2020	G-BYGC, wearing the BOAC livery-planned to be preserved at MOD St Athan, however was scrapped in October 2023.	
Boeing 757-200	56	1983	2010	Launch customer together with Eastern Air Lines. Replaced by Airbus A321.	
Boeing 767-300ER	28	1990	2018	Launch customer with Rolls-Royce RB211 engines Replaced by Boeing 787; 7 sold to Qantas; 4 later operated by Eastern Airlines	
Boeing 777-200	5	1995	2020	Launch customer with General Electric GE90 engines. Three of the aircraft (G-ZZZA, G-ZZZB and G-ZZZC) were among the first 777s ever built. They were used for the GE90 certification campaign before being delivered to BA in November 1995. Replaced by Boeing 777-200ER.	
Aérospatiale-BAC Concorde	7	1976	2003	All aircraft preserved, see Concorde aircraft histories.	

=== Historic gallery ===
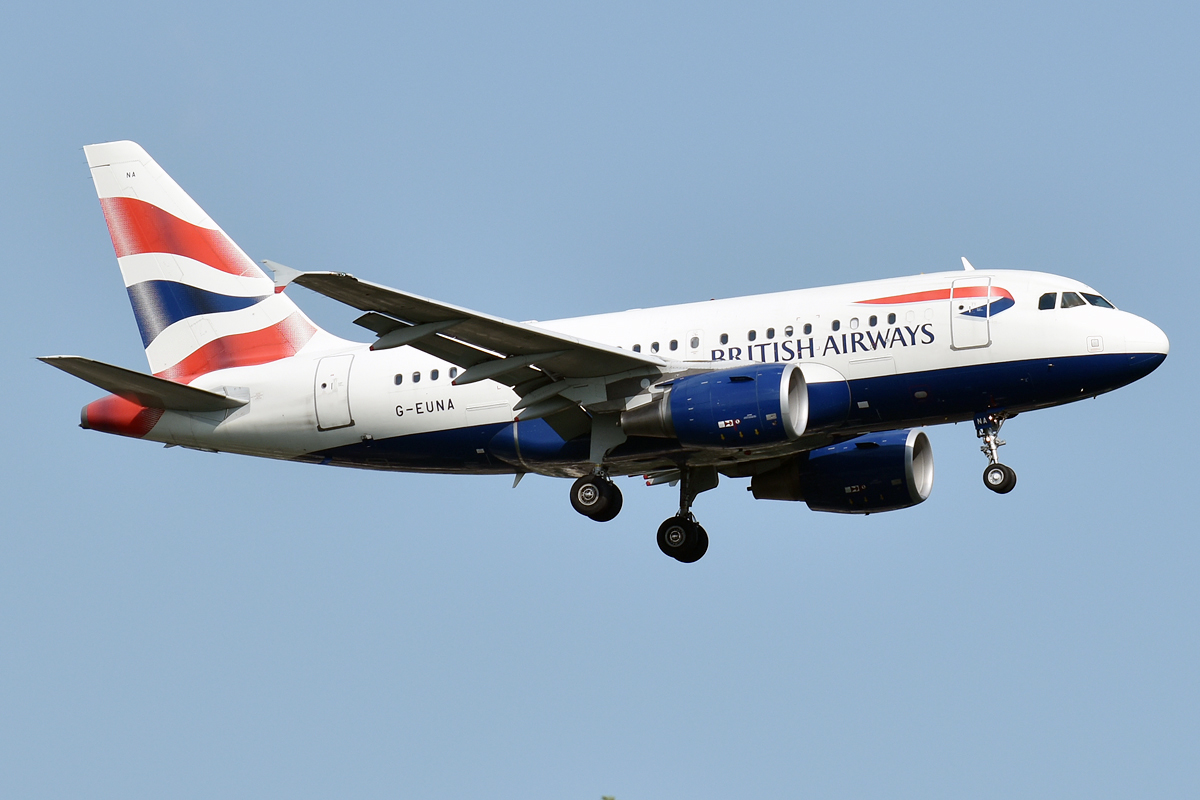
An Airbus A318-100 formerly operated on a sole long-haul route between London-City and New York-JFK

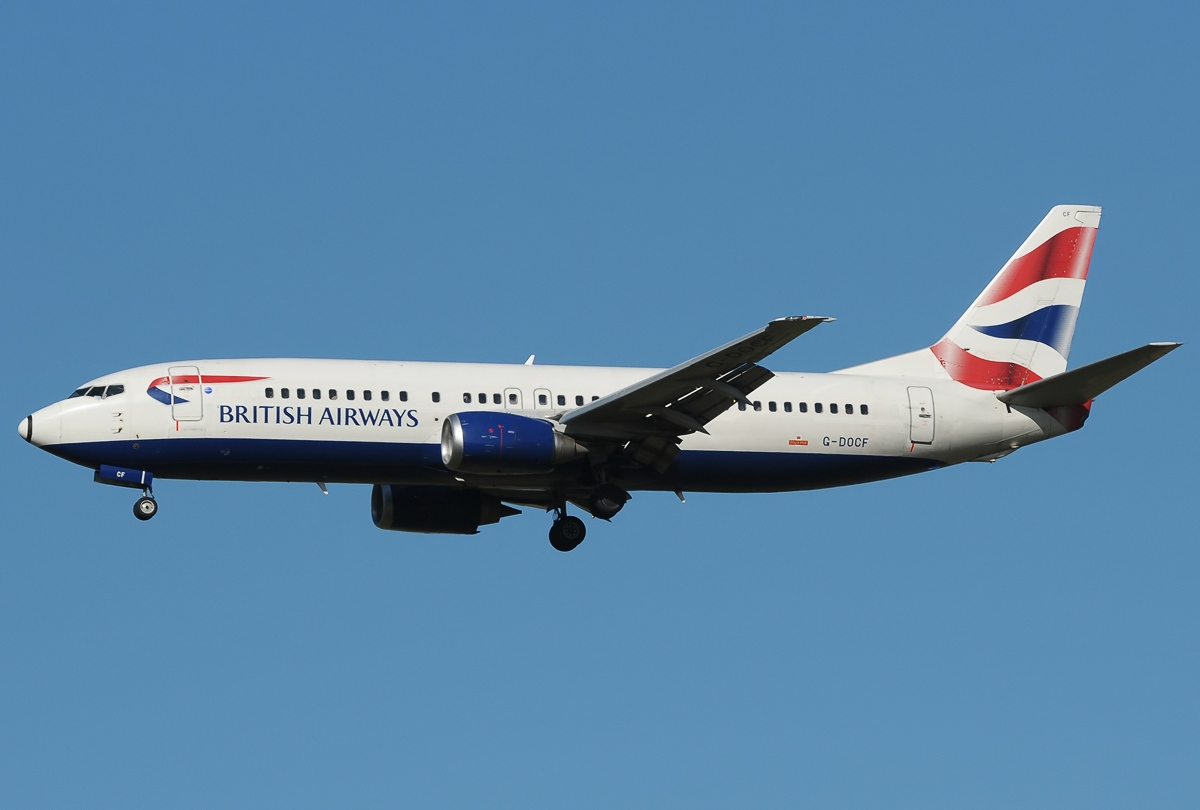
A Boeing 737-400 in 2012

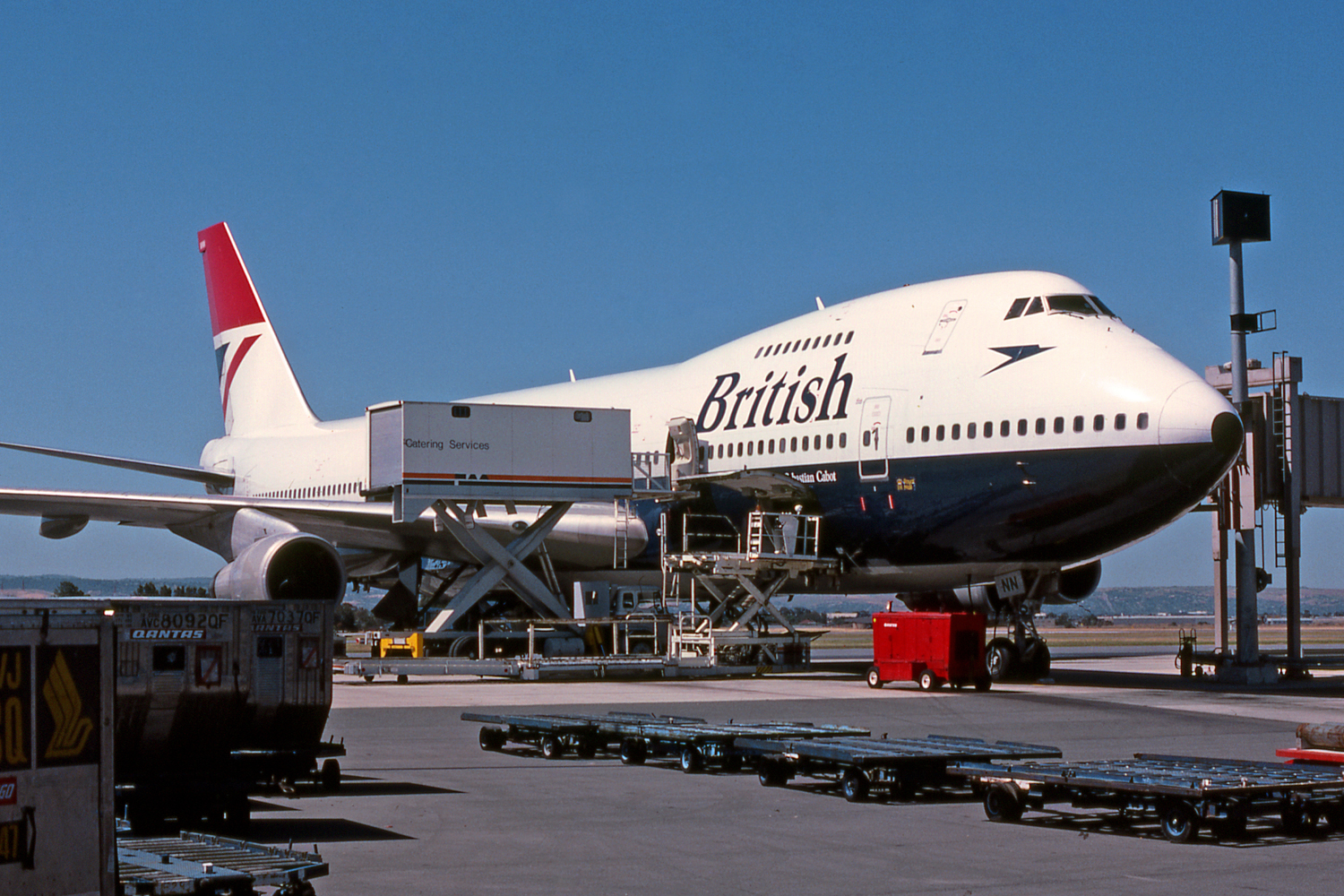
A Boeing 747-100 in 1989

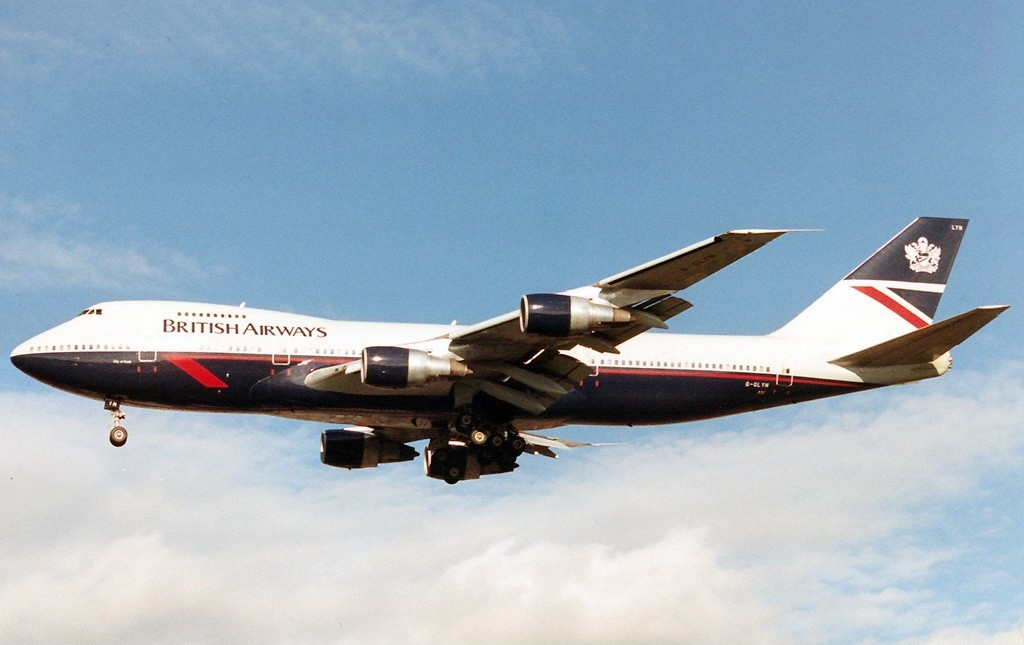
A Boeing 747-200 in 1984

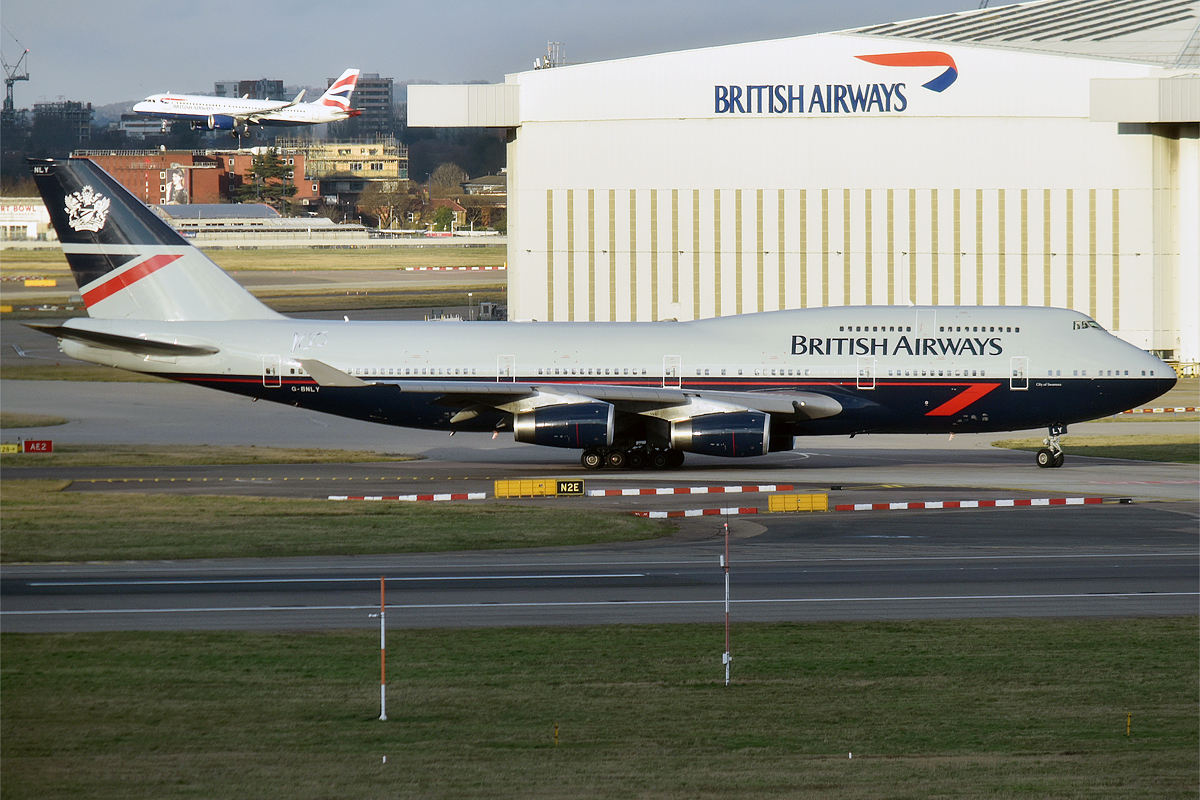
A Boeing 747-400 with the Landor retro livery in 2020

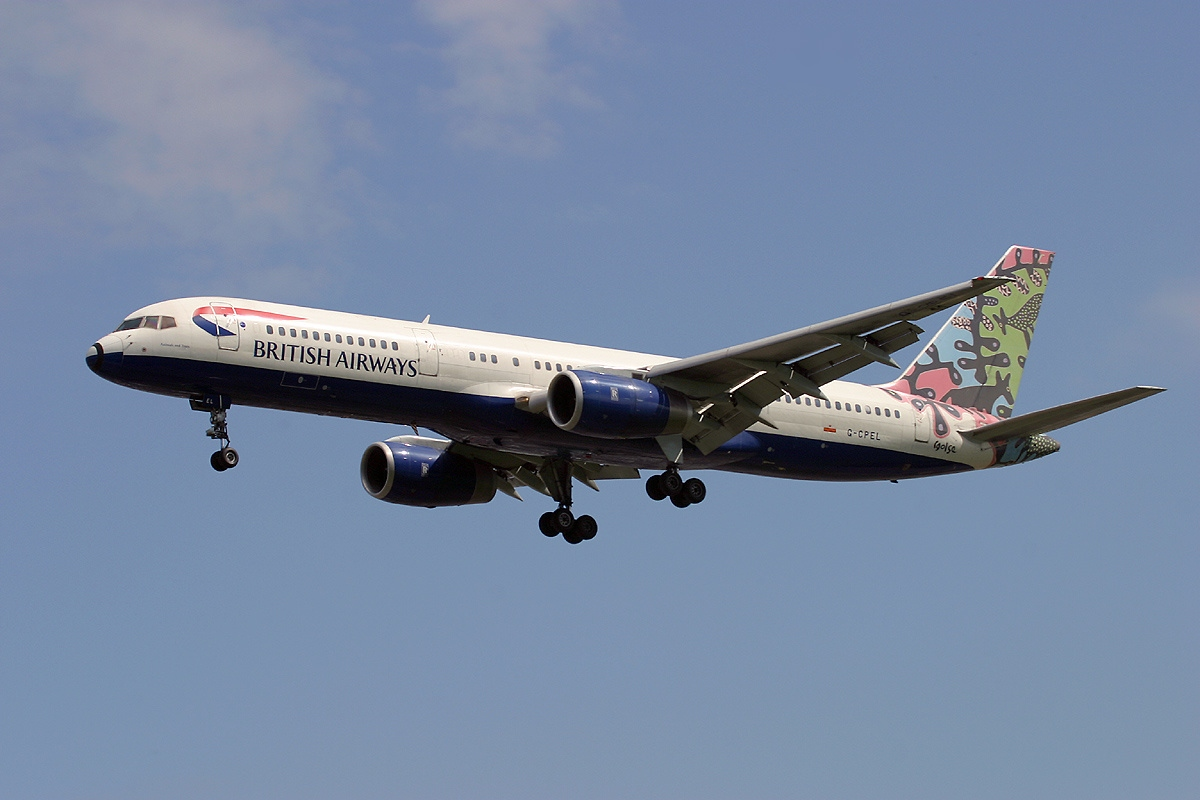
A Boeing 757-200 in 2003, wearing one of the British Airways ethnic liveries

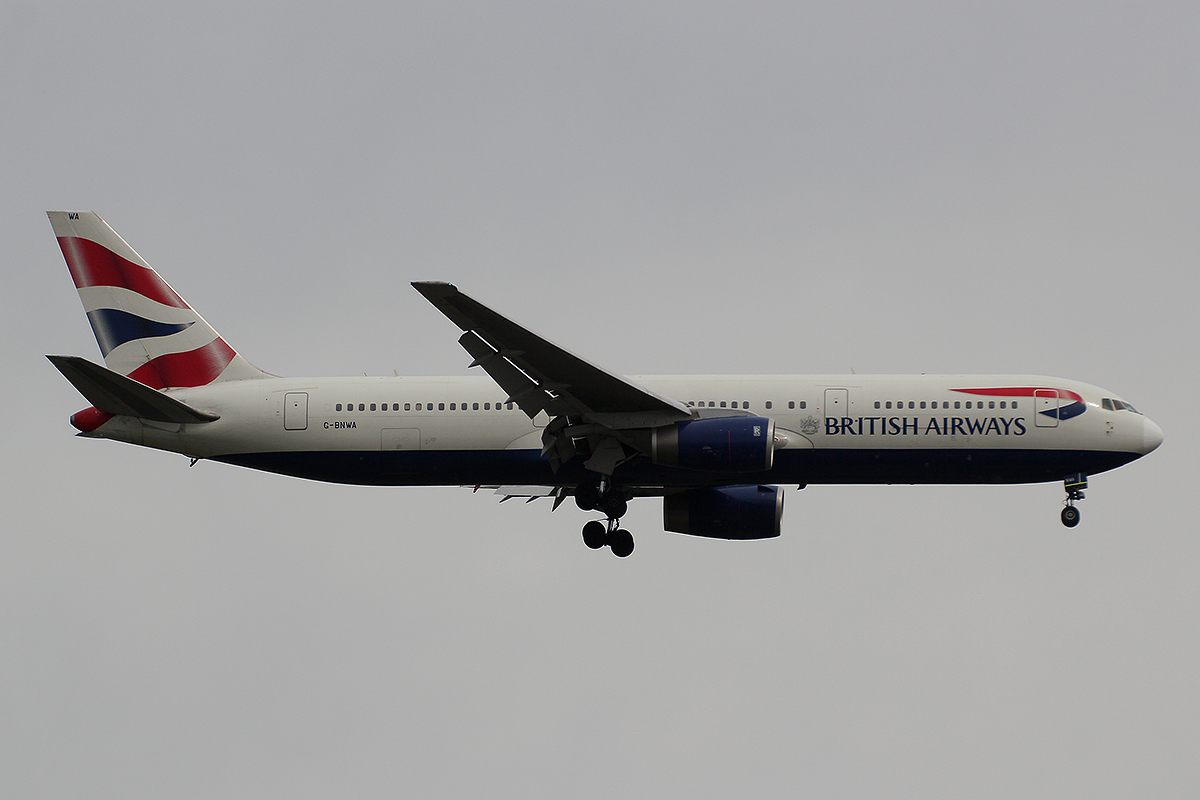
A Boeing 767-300ER in 2017

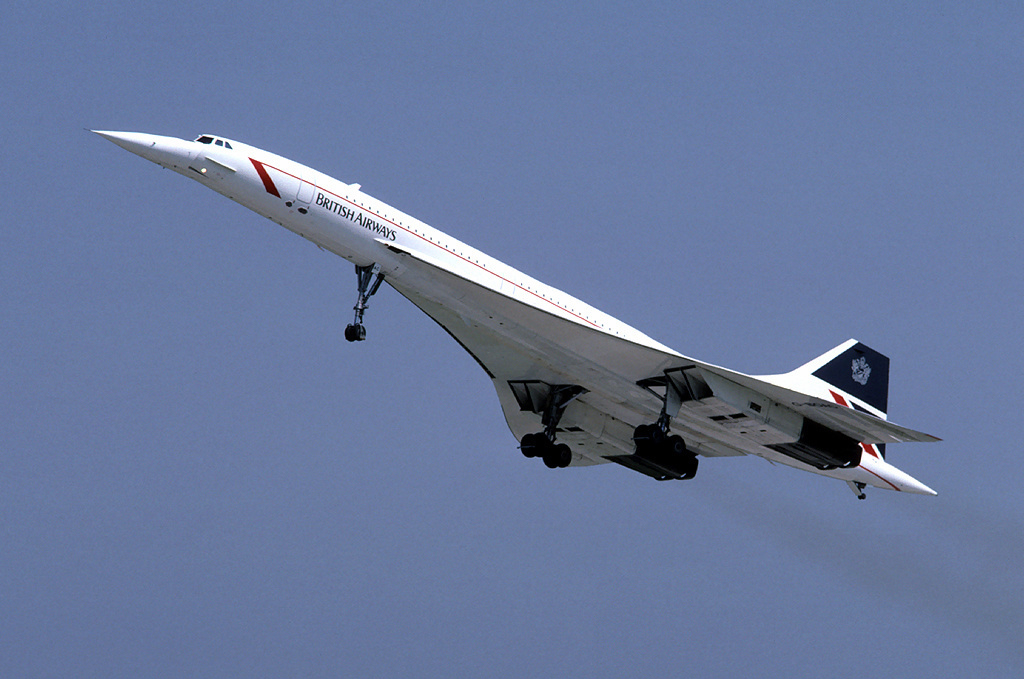
A Concorde in 1986

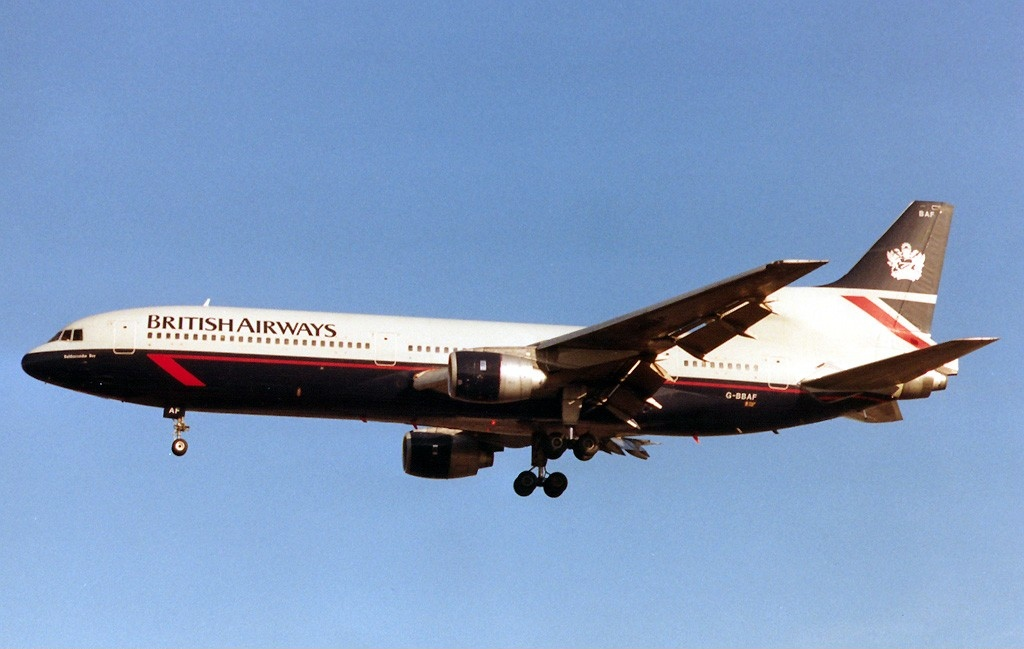
A Lockheed L-1011 TriStar in 1989

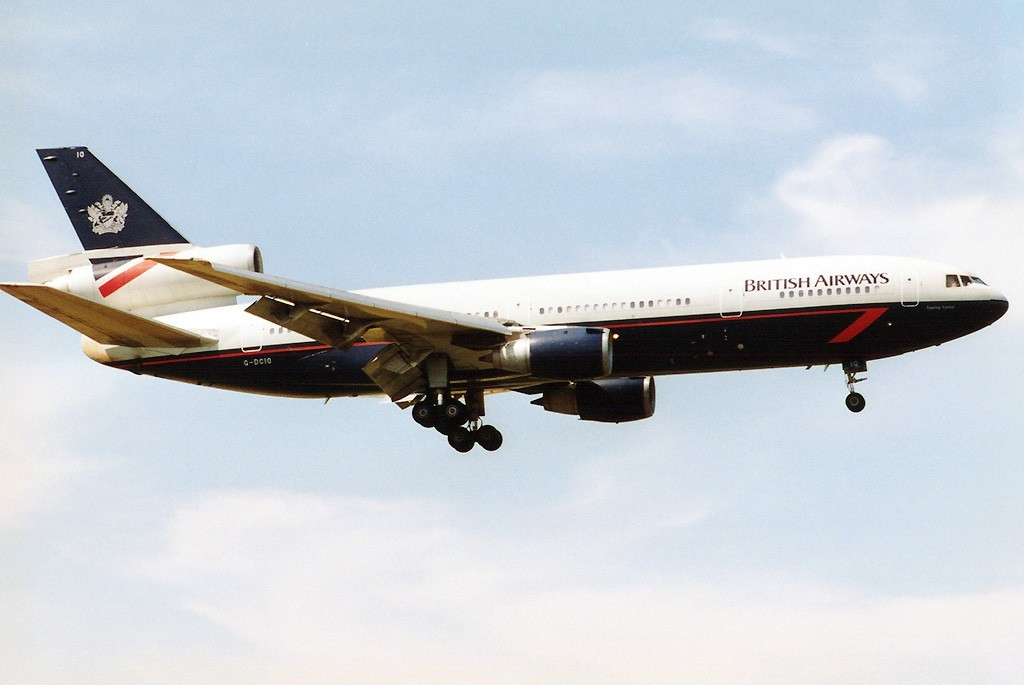
A McDonnell Douglas DC-10-30 in 1996

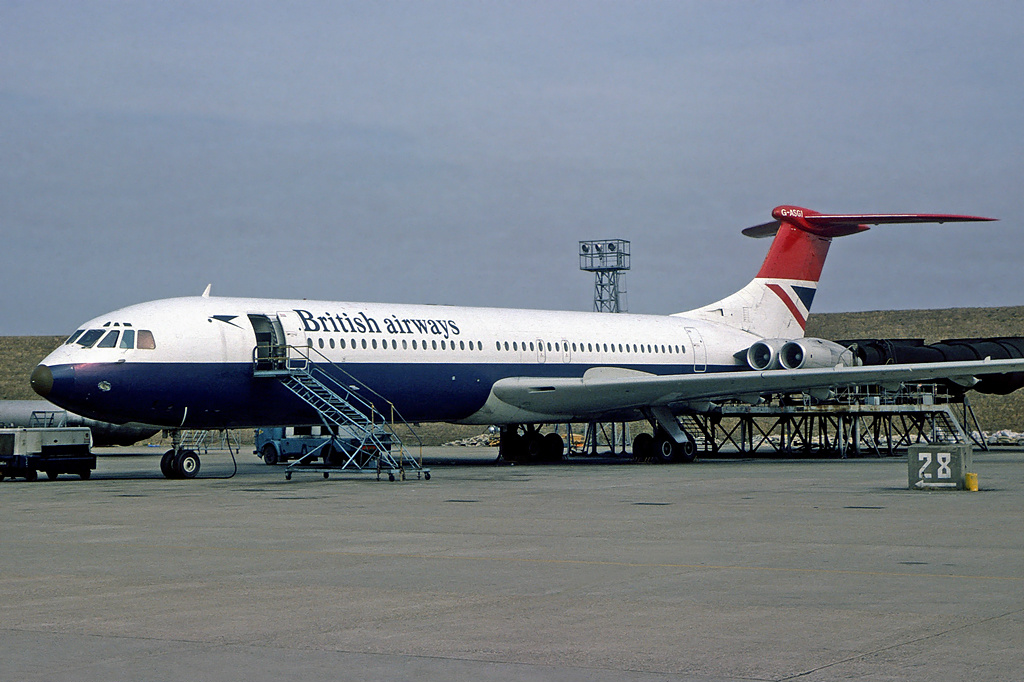
A Vickers Super VC10 in 1975

== See also ==
- Air France fleet
- KLM fleet
- Lufthansa fleet
