= Jumbo Cove =

Cove in South Georgia

Jumbo Cove (54°10′S 36°33′W) is a cove 0.5 nautical miles (1 km) southeast of Busen Point on the north coast of South Georgia. It was charted and named by Discovery Investigations personnel during the period 1926–30.
