= Jumble (disambiguation) =

Jumble may be used as:

- Jumble, the word game.
  - Jumble (British game show), a game show adaption based on the word game
- Jumble algorithm, solving and creating clues seen in the word game
- Jumble (cookie), the widespread travel cookie also known as knots
- Jumble sale, a variation on the term "rummage sale"
- "Jumble" (QI), a 2012 television episode
