= Jumbo Mountain =

Mountain in Washington (state), United States

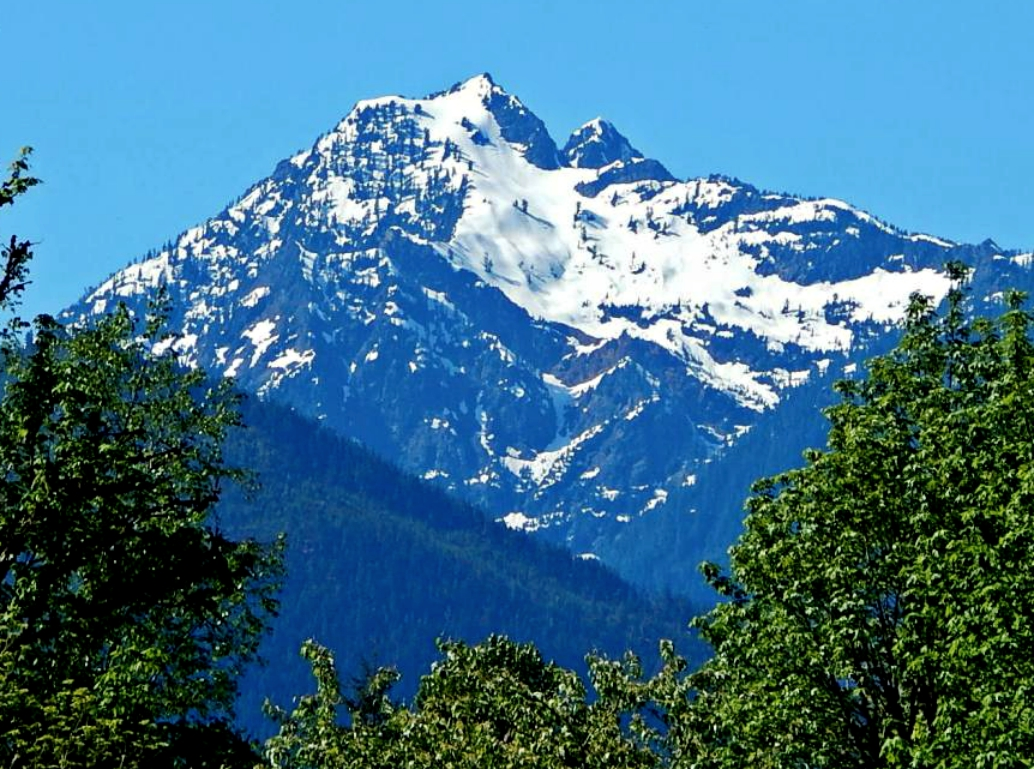
- Jumbo Mountain seen from the north

Highest point
- Elevation: 5,825 ft (1,775 m)
- Prominence: 1,765 ft (538 m)
- Parent peak: Three Fingers
- Isolation: 3.34 mi (5.38 km)
- Coordinates: 48°11′44″N 121°35′59″W

Geography
- Location within Washington (state) Location within the United States
- Interactive map of Jumbo Mountain
- Country: United States
- State: Washington
- County: Snohomish
- Protected area: Boulder River Wilderness
- Parent range: Cascade Range
- Topo map: USGS Helena Ridge

Geology
- Rock type(s): Shale and Sandstone

Climbing
- Easiest route: Scrambling

Jumbo Mountain is a 5,825-foot-elevation (1,775-meter) summit near the western edge of the North Cascades, in Snohomish County of Washington state. It is located four miles south of Darrington, Washington, along the Mountain Loop Highway. It is situated in the Boulder River Wilderness on land administered by the Mount Baker-Snoqualmie National Forest. The mountain was named by miners for its resemblance to an elephant. The nearest higher peak is Buckeye Peak, 3.34 miles (5.38 km) to the west. Precipitation runoff from Jumbo Mountain drains into tributaries of the Stillaguamish River and Sauk River.

== Climate ==
Jumbo Mountain is located in the marine west coast climate zone of western North America. Most weather fronts coming off the Pacific Ocean travel northeast toward the Cascade Mountains. As fronts approach the North Cascades, they are forced upward by the peaks of the Cascade Range (orographic lift), causing them to drop their moisture in the form of rain or snow onto the Cascades. As a result, the west side of the North Cascades experiences high precipitation, especially during the winter months in the form of snowfall. Because of maritime influence, snow tends to be wet and heavy, resulting in high avalanche danger. During winter months, weather is usually cloudy, but, due to high pressure systems over the Pacific Ocean that intensify during summer months, there is often little or no cloud cover during the summer. Due to its temperate climate and proximity to the Pacific Ocean, areas west of the Cascade Crest very rarely experience temperatures below 0 °F (−18 °C) or above 80 °F (27 °C).

== Geology ==
The North Cascades features some of the most rugged topography in the Cascade Range with craggy peaks, ridges, and deep glacial valleys. Geological events occurring many years ago created the diverse topography and drastic elevation changes over the Cascade Range leading to the various climate differences. These climate differences lead to vegetation variety defining the ecoregions in this area.

The history of the formation of the Cascade Mountains dates back millions of years ago to the late Eocene Epoch. With the North American Plate overriding the Pacific Plate, episodes of volcanic igneous activity persisted. In addition, small fragments of the oceanic and continental lithosphere called terranes created the North Cascades about 50 million years ago.

During the Pleistocene period dating back over two million years ago, glaciation advancing and retreating repeatedly scoured the landscape leaving deposits of rock debris. The U-shaped cross section of the river valleys is a result of recent glaciation. Uplift and faulting in combination with glaciation have been the dominant processes which have created the tall peaks and deep valleys of the North Cascades area.

== Gallery ==
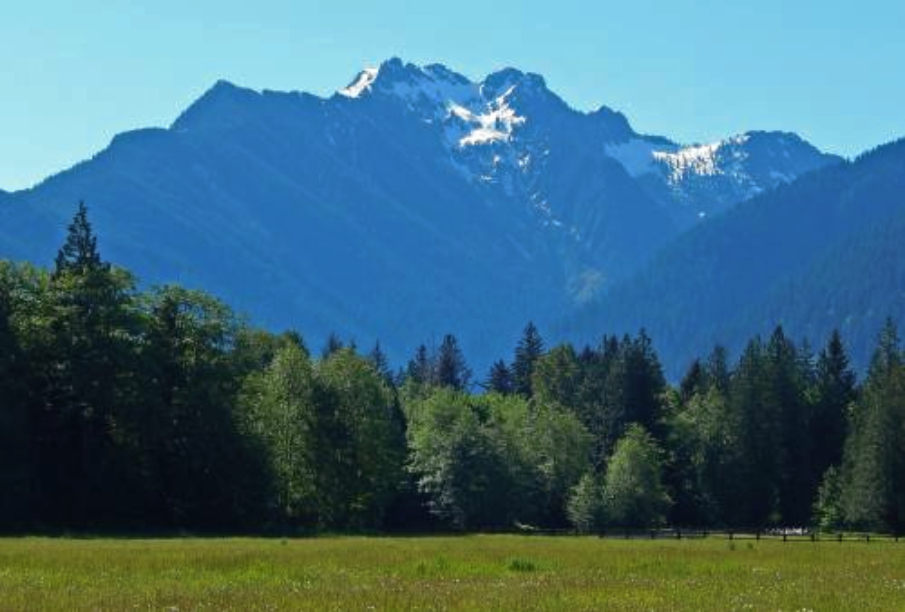
Jumbo Mountain seen from Highway 530

WSW aspect of Jumbo Mountain viewed from Three Fingers

== See also ==
- Geography of the North Cascades
- Geology of the Pacific Northwest
