= Jumbo, Zimbabwe =

Coordinates: 17°28′S 30°55′E

Jumbo
- Village
- Location in Zimbabwe
- Country: Zimbabwe
- Province: Mashonaland Central
- Established: 1890

Population (1982)
  - Total: 4,253

Jumbo is a village in Mazowe District, Zimbabwe. It is located in the Mazowe valley about 10 km north-east of Mazowe. According to the 1982 Population Census, the village had a population of 4,253 people. Ancient gold workings have been found in the area. The village grew around the Jumbo Mine, established in 1890.
