= Werkspoor Jumbo =

Jumbo
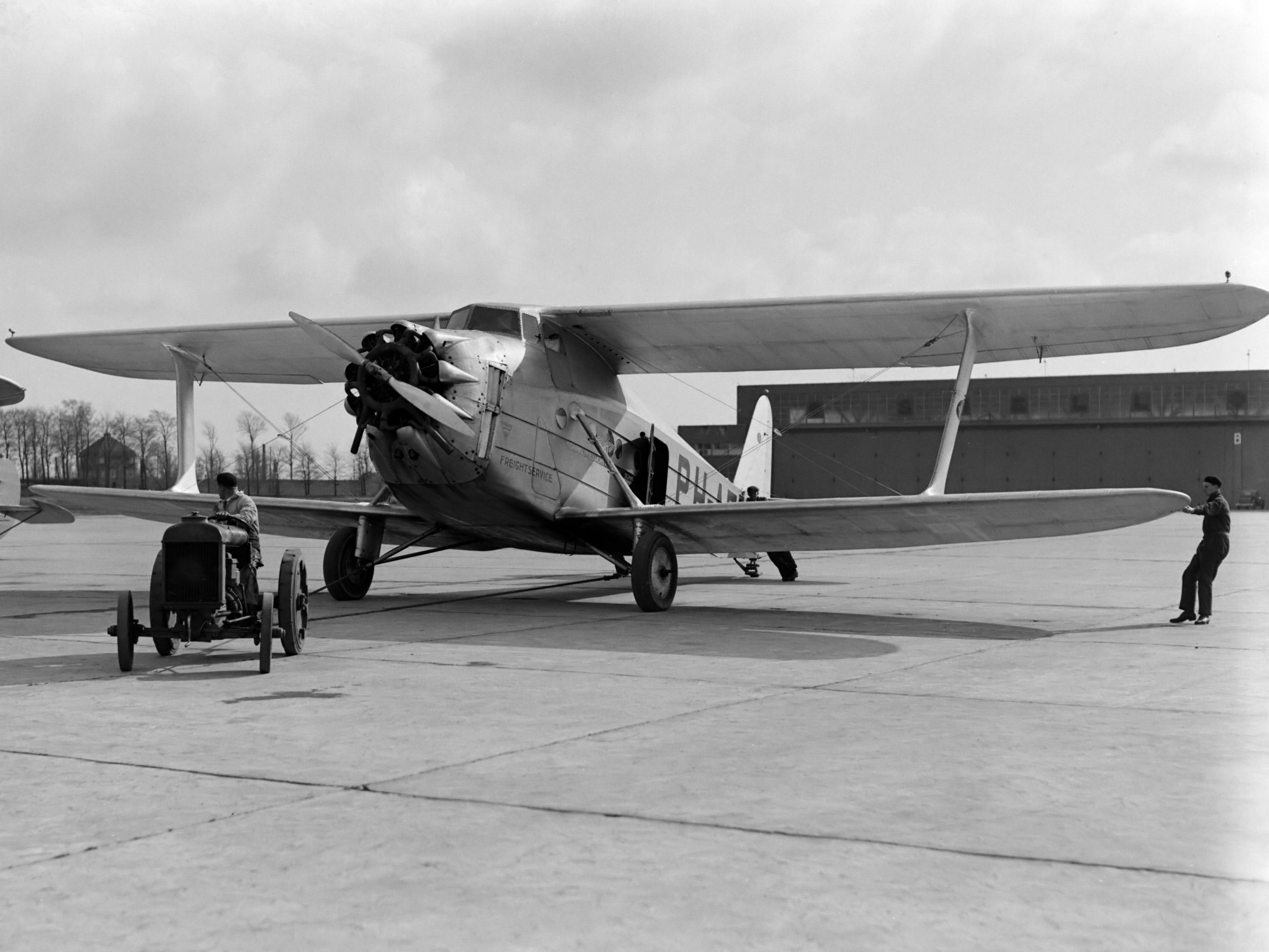
- Werkspoor Jumbo

General information
- Type: Biplane freighter
- National origin: Netherlands
- Manufacturer: Werkspoor
- Designer: Joop Carley
- Status: Destroyed
- Primary user: KLM
- Number built: 1

History
- First flight: 1931

The Werkspoor Jumbo was a 1930s Dutch biplane freighter aircraft design by Joop Carley and built by Werkspoor. Only one aircraft was built (registered PH-AFI), which was sometimes called the Carley Jumbo and was operated by KLM for two years.

Ordered in 1927 as a specialised freighter for KLM. The Jumbo was a large single-engined biplane fitted with two large cargo doors.

Delivered in 1931 it was operated by KLM between Amsterdam, Rotterdam and London for two years and was then passed to the airlines training centre which operated it for the next eight years. In 1938 it was described as a good trainer. The aircraft was destroyed at Amsterdam-Schiphol in a German bombing raid on the 10 May 1940.

== Operators ==
Netherlands
KLM

== Specifications ==
General characteristics

- Crew: 2
- Length: 13.70 m (44 ft 11 in)
- Wingspan: 19.00 m (62 ft 4 in)
- Wing area: 80 m^{2} (861 sq ft)
- Empty weight: 2,391 kg (5,271 lb)
- Gross weight: 4,000 kg (8,818 lb)
- Powerplant: 1 × Gnome-Rhône 9A Jupiter , 358 kW (480 hp)

Performance

- Maximum speed: 182 km/h (113 mph, 98 kn)
- Range: 930 km (580 mi, 500 nmi)
