= Dead End Glacier =

Glacier in Antarctica

- Location within South Georgia Island
- Location: South Georgia
- Coordinates: 54°47′S 35°56′W
- Thickness: unknown
- Terminus: Salomon Glacier
- Status: unknown

Dead End Glacier (54°47′S 35°56′W) is a glacier flowing east from the south end of the Salvesen Range of South Georgia into the west side of Salomon Glacier. It was surveyed by the South Georgia Survey in the period 1951–57, and so named by the UK Antarctic Place-Names Committee because there is no route for sledging parties from the head of this glacier to the north shore of Drygalski Fjord.

== See also ==
- List of glaciers in the Antarctic
- Glaciology
