= Spenceley Glacier =

Glacier in Antarctica

- Location within Antarctica Location within South Georgia Island
- Interactive map of Spenceley Glacier
- Location: South Georgia
- Coordinates: 54°35′S 36°19′W
- Length: 6 nmi (11 km; 7 mi)
- Thickness: unknown
- Terminus: Brøgger Glacier
- Status: unknown

Spenceley Glacier (54°35′S 36°19′W) is a glacier 6 nautical miles (11 km) long, flowing northwest along the southwest flank of Salvesen Range to Brøgger Glacier, in the south part of South Georgia. Surveyed by the South Georgia Survey (SGS) under Duncan Carse in the period 1951–57, and named for George Spenceley, photographer, mountaineer on the SGS, 1955–56 and member of the Yorkshire Ramblers' Club and Alpine Club.

== See also ==
- List of glaciers in the Antarctic
- Glaciology
