= Mount Macklin (South Georgia) =

Mountain in South Georgia

Coordinates: 54°45′S 36°3′W

Mount Macklin is a mountain having 2 peaks, the higher at 1,900 metres (6,200 ft), between Mount Carse and Douglas Crag in the southern part of the Salvesen Range of South Georgia. It was surveyed by the South Georgia Survey in the period 1951–57, and was named by the UK Antarctic Place-Names Committee for Alexander H. Macklin, the medical officer of the Imperial Trans-Antarctic Expedition under Ernest Shackleton, 1914–16. Macklin accompanied Shackleton in the voyage of the James Caird from Elephant Island to King Haakon Bay, South Georgia.
