= Twitcher Glacier =

Glacier in Antarctica

- Location within South Georgia Island
- Location: South Georgia
- Coordinates: 54°43′S 35°56′W
- Length: 4 nmi (7 km; 5 mi)
- Thickness: unknown
- Terminus: Iris Bay
- Status: unknown

Twitcher Glacier (54°43′S 35°56′W) is a glacier, 4 miles (6 km) long, which flows east from the Salvesen Range to the east coast of South Georgia, immediately south of Herz Glacier and Iris Bay. The glacier was surveyed in 1951-52 by the SGS. Named by the United Kingdom Antarctic Place-Names Committee (UK-APC) for John Montagu, 4th Earl of Sandwich, First Lord of the Admiralty, 1771–82, who was popularly known as "Jemmy Twitcher."

== See also ==
- List of glaciers in the Antarctic
- Glaciology
