= Henningsen Glacier =

Glacier in Antarctica

- Location within South Georgia Island
- Location: South Georgia
- Coordinates: 54°27′S 36°42′W
- Length: 3 nmi (6 km; 3 mi)
- Thickness: unknown
- Terminus: Rocky Bay
- Status: unknown

Henningsen Glacier (54°27′S 36°42′W) is a glacier 3 nautical miles (6 km) long, flowing southwest to the south coast of South Georgia between Cape Darnley and Rocky Bay. It was surveyed in the period 1951–57 by the South Georgia Survey expedition led by Duncan Carse, and was named by the UK Antarctic Place-Names Committee for Leonard Henningsen, Manager of Tønsbergs Hvalfangeri, Husvik, 1945–50.

== See also ==
- List of glaciers in the Antarctic
- Glaciology
