= Hamilton Bay =

Hamilton Bay (54°48′S 35°54′W) is a small bay at the mouth of Salomon Glacier, indenting the southeast coast of South Georgia 0.4 nautical miles (0.7 km) northeast of the mouth of Drygalski Fjord. It was surveyed by the South Georgia Survey in the period 1951–57, and named by the UK Antarctic Place-Names Committee for James E. Hamilton (1893–1957), Colonial Naturalist to the Falkland Islands, who was seconded for service with the Discovery Investigations, 1925–28.
