= Risting Glacier =

Glacier in South Georgia

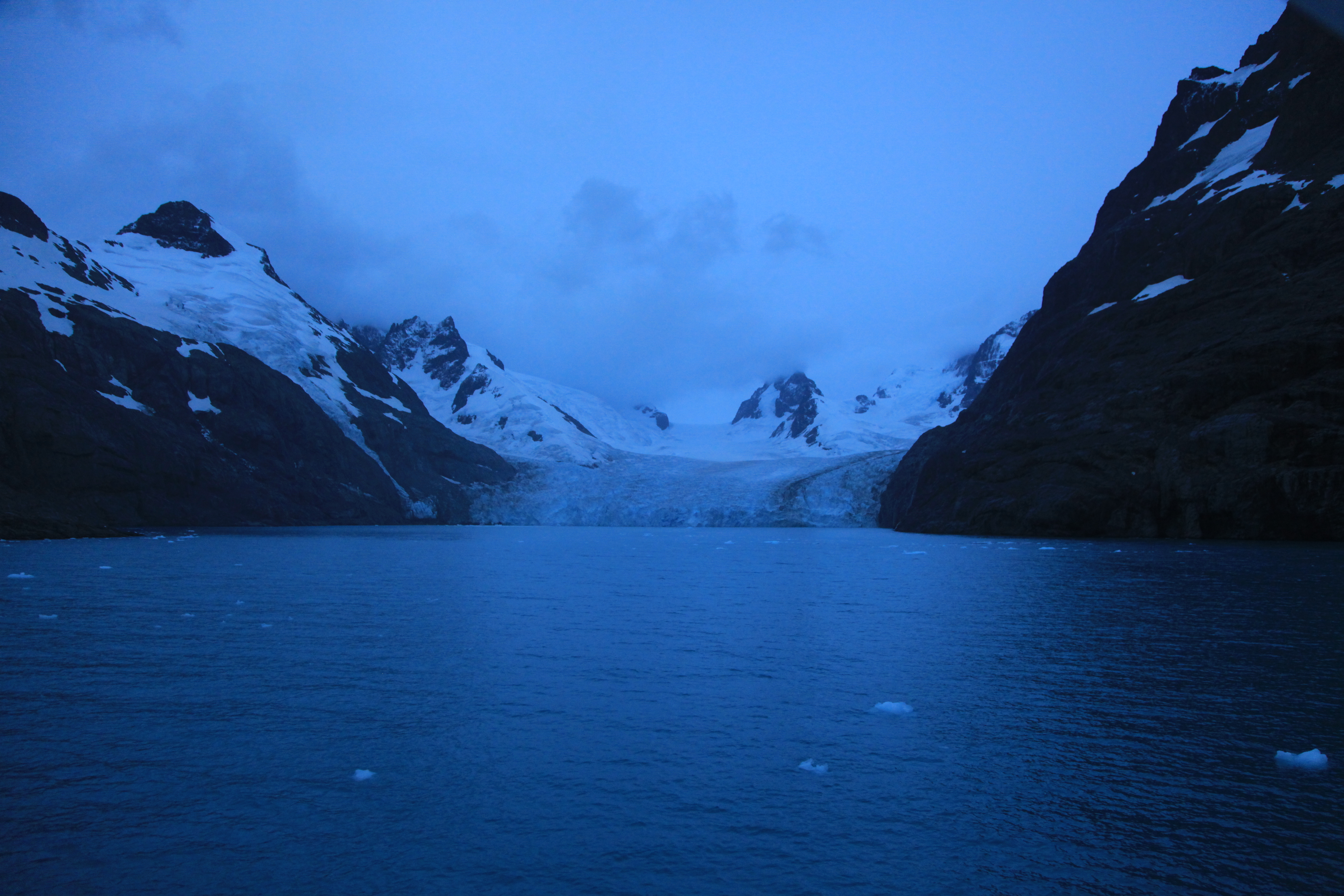
- Risting Glacier flows into Drygalski Ford

- Location within South Georgia Island
- Location: South Georgia
- Coordinates: 54°46′S 36°6′W
- Length: 4.5 nmi (8 km; 5 mi)
- Thickness: unknown
- Terminus: Drygalski Fjord
- Status: unknown

Risting Glacier (54°46′S 36°6′W) is a glacier, 4.5 nautical miles (8 km) long, lying north of Jenkins Glacier and flowing southeast into the head of Drygalski Fjord in the south part of South Georgia. Surveyed by the South Georgia Survey (SGS) under Duncan Carse in the period 1951–57, and named by the United Kingdom Antarctic Place-Names Committee (UK-APC) for Sigurd Risting (1870-1935), Norwegian whaling historian; secretary of Norsk Hvalfangerforening, 1918–35, and editor of Norsk Hvalfangst-Tidende, 1922–35. The German Antarctic Expedition under Wilhelm Filchner, 1911–12, named Drygalski Fjord and this glacier for Erich von Drygalski, leader of the German Antarctic Expedition, 1901–03, but the name for the glacier did not survive. A number of features in Antarctica, including Drygalski Glacier, are named for Drygalski.

== See also ==
- List of glaciers in the Antarctic
- Glaciology
