= Cape Nuñez =

Headland on the south coast of South Georgia

Cape Nuñez (54°16′S 37°25′W) is a headland forming the southwest extremity of Nuñez Peninsula on the south coast of South Georgia. The name dates back to at least 1912 and was probably given by whalers who frequented this coast.

Nuñez Peninsula (54°15′S 37°21′W) is a rocky and comparatively snow-free peninsula, 5 miles (8 km) long, lying between Queen Maud Bay and Jossac Bight on the south coast of South Georgia. The feature was known to early whalers and sealers on South Georgia. It was surveyed by the South Georgia Survey in the period 1951–1957, and named by the UK Antarctic Place-Names Committee in association with Cape Nuñez, the southwest extremity of the peninsula.
