= Harmer Glacier =

Glacier in Antarctica

- Location within South Georgia Island
- Location: South Georgia
- Coordinates: 54°46′S 36°15′W
- Length: 3 nmi (6 km; 3 mi)
- Thickness: unknown
- Terminus: Ranvik
- Status: unknown

Harmer Glacier (54°46′S 36°15′W) is a glacier 3 nautical miles (6 km) long, flowing southwest from Starbuck Peak to the sea close north of Ranvik, on the south coast of South Georgia. It was surveyed by the South Georgia Survey in the period 1951–57, and named by the UK Antarctic Place-Names Committee for Sir Sidney F. Harmer.

== See also ==
- List of glaciers in the Antarctic
- Glaciology
