= Austin Head =

Cape in South Georgia

Austin Head (54°31′S 36°30′W) is a prominent headland located 2 miles (3 km) north-northwest of Leon Head, protruding into Undine South Harbour on the southern coast of South Georgia. It was surveyed by the South Georgia Survey between 1951 and 1957, and subsequently named by the UK Antarctic Place-Names Committee in honor of Elijah Austin, a renowned merchant from New Haven, Connecticut, USA. Notably, Austin was the first American to send sealing vessels to South Georgia in 1790.
