= Starbuck Peak =

Mountain in South Georgia

Starbuck Peak (54°44′S 36°12′W) is a peak, 1,435 m, standing between the heads of Risting Glacier and Harmer Glacier in the south part of South Georgia. Surveyed by the South Georgia Survey in the period 1951–57, and named by the United Kingdom Antarctic Place-Names Committee (UK-APC) for Alexander Starbuck, American whaling historian; author of History of the American Whaling Fishery From Its Earliest Inception to the Year 1876. The first ascent was made on 23 September 2016 by Henry Chaplin, Caradoc Jones, David Lund, Skip Novak, Simon Richardson and Stephen Venables.
