= Helland Glacier =

Glacier in Antarctica

- Location within South Georgia Island
- Location: South Georgia
- Coordinates: 54°29′S 36°37′W
- Length: 4 nmi (7 km; 5 mi)
- Thickness: unknown
- Terminus: Rocky Bay
- Status: unknown

Helland Glacier (54°29′S 36°37′W) is a glacier 4 nautical miles (7 km) long flowing southwest from Mount Paget to Rocky Bay, on the south side of South Georgia. It was mapped by Olaf Holtedahl during his visit to South Georgia in 1927–28, and named by him for Amund Helland, a Norwegian mining geologist and glaciologist.

== See also ==
- List of glaciers in the Antarctic
- Glaciology
- Hellandfjellet
