= Mount Cunningham =

Mountain in South Georgia

- Location within South Georgia Island

Highest point
- Elevation: 1,218 m (3,996 ft)
- Listing: 16th highest mountain in South Georgia and the South Sandwich Islands
- Coordinates: 54°12′24″S 37°17′53″W

Geography
- Location: Location on South Georgia

Mount Cunningham is a mountain at the west end of South Georgia's Esmark Glacier. It is situated between Jossac Bight and Queen Maud Bay. With an elevation of 1,218 metres (3,996 ft), it is the 16th highest mountain in South Georgia. The mountain was named after Scottish mountaineer John Crabbe Cunningham as a memorial after his death on 31 January 1980, following a climbing accident when struck by waves off Holyhead.

== Namesake ==
Cunningham was a well known Scottish climber who spent many years developing innovative ice climbing techniques and pushing rock climbing standards. He worked not only for the British Antarctic Survey (BAS), but also the Glenmore Lodge and I M Marsh Campus in Liverpool. He served in the BAS of the British Antarctic Territory (BAT). On 23 November 1964, Cunningham became the first to climb Antarctica's Mount Jackson; he was also Station Commander of Adelaide Island in 1964–65, as well as a member of the South Georgia Survey of 1955–56.

== Geography ==
Mount Cunningham is the 16th highest peak in the list of mountain peaks in South Georgia and the South Sandwich Islands. It is situated outside the BAT. Situated west of the Allardyce Range and northwest of Esmark Glacier, nearby mountains are the Warburton Peak (1,089 metres (3,573 ft)), Bomford Peak (1,141 metres (3,743 ft)), Pyramid Peak (475 metres (1,558 ft)), Smillie Peak (1,765 metres (5,791 ft)), Stanley Peak (1,263 metres (4,144 ft)), and Comer Crag (634 metres (2,080 ft)). The mountain peaks are not connected. However, the Mount Cunningham is a high mountain peak in the mountain range which extends over a length of 1.5 miles (2.4 km). With sharply-rising cliffs facing the sea, Mount Cunningham is situated at the head of low tussock-covered hills near the enclosed King Haakon Bay, an inlet on the southern coast. The headland of Cape Nunez is directly to the south while Jossac Bight is to the southeast.
