= Mount Grant (South Georgia) =

Mountain in South Georgia

Highest point
- Elevation: 1,205 m (3,953 ft)
- Coordinates: 54°15′S 37°7′W

Geography
- Location: South Georgia

Mount Grant is a mountain, 1,205 metres (3,950 ft) high, standing between Esmark Glacier and Keilhau Glacier on the south side of South Georgia. It was surveyed by the South Georgia Survey in the period 1951–57, and named by the UK Antarctic Place-Names Committee for Henry E.W. Grant, Colonial Secretary and Legal Adviser in the Falkland Islands, 1906–09, who contributed to the early development of the whaling industry and the conservation of whales in the area.
