= John Crabbe Cunningham =

Scottish climber (1927–1980)

- Born: 23 November 1927; Glasgow, Scotland
- Died: 31 January 1980 (aged 52); Anglesey, Holyhead, Wales

John Crabbe Cunningham (23 November 1927 – 31 January 1980) was a Scottish climber. Born in Glasgow, he was a member of the Creagh Dhu Mountaineering Club and climbed extensively in the Scottish mountains, where he pioneered new techniques of ice climbing.

During the 1950s and 1960s, Cunningham went to New Zealand, India, South Georgia and Antarctica. He wanted to climb Mount Everest, and in 1953 he had gone to Nepal via India with Hamish MacInnes, also a Scottish mountaineer, to start his climb. However, Hillary and Tenzing had made it to the top of Mount Everest before he could begin.

On 23 November 1964, he made the first ascent of Antarctica's Mount Jackson.

== Professional years ==
Cunningham was a member of the South Georgia Survey led by Duncan Carse for the third field season, 1955–56.

In 1960 Cunningham started his career with the Falkland Islands Dependencies Survey, which became the British Antarctic Survey in 1962. He served as base leader at Base A, Port Lockroy for the winter of 1960, followed by two winters at Base E, Stonington Island, again as base leader, 1961 and 1962. He returned for a fourth winter in 1964, this time as base leader at Base T, Adelaide Island, during which time he and three companions climbed Mount Jackson. (Both Port Lockroy and Stonington Island bases are now Historic Sites under the Antarctic Treaty, managed on behalf of BAS by the UK Antarctic Heritage Trust.

In the 1970s, after he returned to Scotland, he became an instructor at the Glenmore Lodge near Aviemore. In this capacity he perfected innovations in techniques for front point cramponing and use of curved pick ice axes on steep sloping ice. He had used this front point technique while working in Antarctica on icebergs and cliffs with a slope of 70 to 90 degrees. In 1976 he became an instructor at I M Marsh Campus in Liverpool.

On 31 January 1980, he took a group of six students for practical instruction on climbing to the South Stack sea-cliffs on Anglesey. Weather conditions deteriorated whilst the group were coasteering and a student was swept off the cliff. During the attempt to rescue him, a mature student tried to swim out to him with a rope but got into difficulty and Cunningham and a third student were washed into the sea. Cunningham, who was not a strong swimmer, was drowned. The three students survived but their instructor's body was never found.

== Honours ==
Cunningham was awarded the Perry Medal by the Royal Geographical Society in the 1950s.

He was awarded the Polar Medal in 1967.

Mount Cunningham (1,220 metres (4,000 ft)) in the Queen Maud Bay at the southern end of South Georgia was named in his honour.

His biography, titled Creagh Dhu Climber, the life and times of John Cunningham, was published by Ernest Press.
