= Diamond Peak =

Diamond Peak may refer to:

- Diamond Peak (Arizona), a summit in the Grand Canyon
- Diamond Peak (California)
- Diamond Peak (Colorado)
- Diamond Peak (Greenland), a mountain in the Stauning Alps
- Diamond Peak (Idaho)
- Diamond Peak (Montana), a mountain in Flathead County, Montana
- Diamond Peak (Nevada)
  - Diamond Peak (ski area), a ski area in Nevada, United States
- Diamond Peak (South Georgia)
- Diamond Peak (Oregon)
  - Diamond Peak Wilderness, a wilderness area in Oregon that includes the Diamond Peak volcano
- Diamond Peak (Garfield County, Washington), a mountain in Garfield County, Washington

== See also ==
- Diamond Hill (disambiguation)
- Diamond Mountain (disambiguation)
