= Jewell Glacier =

Glacier in Antarctica

- Location within South Georgia Island
- Location: South Georgia
- Coordinates: 54°16′S 37°8′W
- Thickness: unknown
- Terminus: Jossac Bight
- Status: unknown

Jewell Glacier (54°16′S 37°8′W) is a short glacier flowing south-southwest from Mount Grant into Jossac Bight on the south coast of South Georgia. It was named by the UK Antarctic Place-Names Committee in 1982 after John A. Jewell, a British Antarctic Survey field assistant in this area in 1976–77, at Rothera Research Station in 1977–78, and Base Commander at Rothera, 1978–80.

== See also ==
- List of glaciers in the Antarctic
- Glaciology
