= Douglas Crag =

Douglas Crag (54°46′S 36°0′W) is a crag, 1,670 metres (5,480 ft) high, standing 1 nautical mile (2 km) southeast of Mount Macklin at the south end of the Salvesen Range of South Georgia. It was surveyed by the South Georgia Survey in the period 1951–57, and named by the UK Antarctic Place-Names Committee for George V. Douglas, a geologist with the British expedition under Ernest Shackleton, 1921–22.
