= Wood Point =

Wood Point may refer to:

- Wood Point (Antarctica), a point on the coast of Ross Island
- Wood Point near Jason Harbour in the north side of Cumberland West Bay, South Georgia.
