= Mount Paterson =

Mountain of South Georgia

Coordinates: 54°39′S 36°8′W

Mount Paterson is a mountain, 2,195 m, standing 2 miles (3.2 km) north-northwest of Mount Carse in the Salvesen Range of South Georgia. Surveyed by the South Georgia Survey (SGS) in the period 1951–57, and named for Stanley B. Paterson, assistant surveyor of the SGS, 1955–56.
