= Ducloz Head =

Ducloz Head (54°31′S 36°39′W) is a headland which forms the northwest side of the entrance to Undine South Harbour on the south coast of South Georgia. It was first charted in 1819 by a Russian expedition under Fabian Gottlieb von Bellingshausen. It was named by the UK Antarctic Place-Names Committee, following a survey by the South Georgia Survey, 1951–52, for Le Sieur Ducloz Guyot, a passenger in the Spanish vessel León, which sighted South Georgia in 1756.

During the 1950s, Duncan Carse, for whom Mount Carse was named, surveyed various inland areas of South Georgia. He negotiated a rent of a shilling per annum for four hectares of land at Ducloz Head, and paid ten years rent in advance. On 23 February 1961, Carse was dropped off by HMS Owen with 12 tonnes of supplies, and a prefabricated hut. He was revisited in April, but it was on 20 May that a freak wave washed him, his hut and his supplies into the sea. He managed to survive the Southern Winter for another 116 days, when he was rescued by a sealing ship.
