= Hammerstad Reef =

Hammerstad Reef (54°13′S 37°25′W) is a reef 1.5 nautical miles (3 km) south of Cape Rosa, lying in the northern part of the entrance to Queen Maud Bay off the south coast of South Georgia. It was surveyed by the South Georgia Survey in the period 1951–57, and named by the UK Antarctic Place-Names Committee for Thorleif Hammerstad, a sealer of the Compañía Argentina de Pesca, Grytviken, for several years beginning in 1946.
