= Kohl Plateau =

Kohl Plateau (54°14′S 36°57′W) is an ice-covered plateau, over 760 metres (2,500 ft) high, standing between the heads of Keilhau Glacier and Neumayer Glacier in the central part of South Georgia. It was discovered and first indicated on a map by Ludwig Kohl-Larsen during his 1929–30 expedition; the plateau was surveyed and named for its discoverer by the South Georgia Survey, 1951–52.
