= Jenkins Glacier =

Glacier in Antarctica

- Location within South Georgia Island
- Location: South Georgia
- Coordinates: 54°46′S 36°7′W
- Thickness: unknown
- Terminus: Drygalski Fjord
- Status: unknown

Jenkins Glacier (54°46′S 36°7′W) is a glacier close south of Risting Glacier, flowing east into the head of Drygalski Fjord in the southeastern part of South Georgia. The glacier was named for Erich von Drygalski by the Second German Antarctic Expedition, 1911–12, under Wilhelm Filchner. To avoid duplication with Drygalski Glacier in Graham Land, also named for Erich von Drygalski, a new name was proposed in 1957 by the UK Antarctic Place-Names Committee. Jenkins Glacier is named for James Travis Jenkins, author of A History of the Whale Fisheries and Bibliography of Whaling.

== See also ==
- List of glaciers in the Antarctic
- Glaciology
