= Herz Glacier =

Glacier in Antarctica

- Location within South Georgia Island
- Location: South Georgia
- Coordinates: 54°41′S 35°58′W
- Thickness: unknown
- Terminus: Iris Bay
- Status: unknown

Herz Glacier (54°41′S 35°58′W) is a glacier flowing southeast from the vicinity of Mount Paterson to the east coast of South Georgia. It was named by the Second German Antarctic Expedition under Wilhelm Filchner, 1911–12.

== See also ==
- List of glaciers in the Antarctic
- Glaciology
