= Leon Head =

Cape in South Georgia and the South Sandwich Islands

Leon Head (54°33′S 36°29′W) is a prominent rocky headland, 880 metres (2,900 ft) high, forming the south side of the mouth of Brøgger Glacier and the southeast side of the entrance to Undine South Harbour, on the south coast of South Georgia. The headland was roughly charted in 1819 by a Russian expedition under Fabian Gottlieb von Bellingshausen. It was named by the UK Antarctic Place-Names Committee, following a survey by the South Georgia Survey, 1951–52, for the Spanish vessel Leon, which sighted South Georgia in 1756.
