= Semla Reef =

Reef in Antarctica

Semla Reef (54°15′S 37°25′W) is a reef, 1 nautical mile (1.9 km) long, at the south side of the entrance to Queen Maud Bay on the south side of South Georgia. Surveyed by the SGS in the period 1951–57, and named by the United Kingdom Antarctic Place-Names Committee (UK-APC) for the ex-catcher Georgia Whaling Co., Leith Harbor, as a service boat.
