= Sigurd Risting =

Norwegian writer

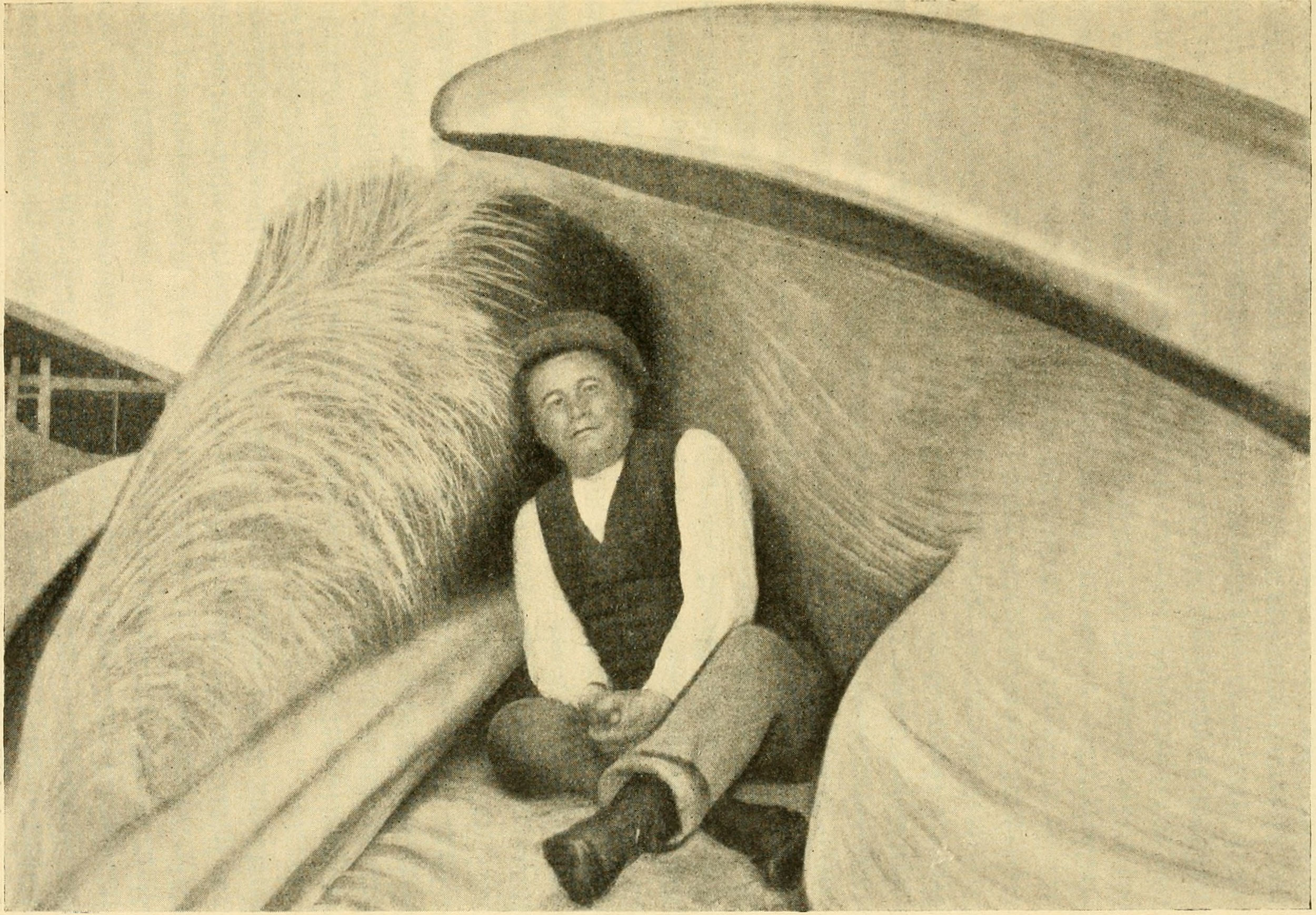
- Born: 1870; Sunnfjord, Norway
- Died: 14 October 1935 (aged 64–65)
- Occupation: Whaling historian

Signature
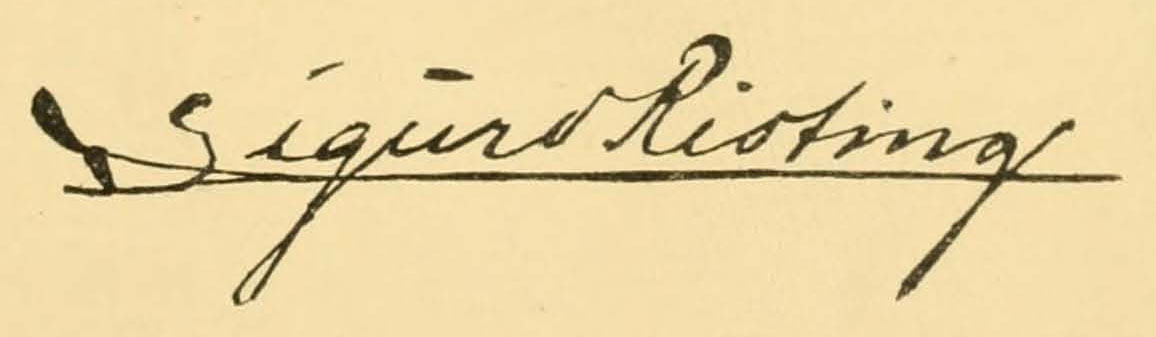

Sigurd Risting (13 May 1870 – 14 October 1935) was a Norwegian writer and historian. He was born in the district of Sunnfjord in Norway. He studied at Nordfjords amtskole and Sogndals Folkehøgskule and examined at Stord lærarskule 1889. He was the second teacher in 1893 and principal in 1896 at Skiringssals ungdomsskule.

== Whaling ==
Later in his life, Risting became interested in whaling and began to write about the history and statistics of modern whaling. In 1922 he wrote the first Norwegian history about whaling; Av Hvalfangstens Historie (the History of Whaling), collecting 20 years of experience and statistics of whaling. Since 1903 he had compiled annual reviews, and in June 1913 he joined the staff of the newly started periodical Norsk Hvalfangst-Tidende (The Norwegian Whaling Gazette) for which he later (1922–1935) became the editor. In 1930 Risting created the International Whaling Statistics and in the first numbers of the periodical he collected from the whole world whaling statistics back to 1868.

From 1918 to the end of his life, Risting was secretary of the Norsk Hvalfangerforening (the Whaling Association of Norway).

Risting Glacier in South Georgia was named after Risting.

== Works ==
- 1905: Henrik Wergeland, 27 pages
- 1916; Hvalfangerflaaten 1916, 63 pages
- 1922: Av Hvalfangstens Historie, 658 pages
- 1928: Whales and whale foetuses: statistics of catch and measurements collected from the Norwegian whalers' association 1922–25, 122 pages
- 1929: Kaptein C. A. Larsen, 142 pages
- and many, many articles in different periodicals
