= Holmestrand (South Georgia) =

Coordinates: 54°15′S 37°16′W

Holmestrand is a point at the west side of Jossac Bight, on the south coast of South Georgia. The name appears on a chart based on surveys by DI personnel during 1925–30, but was probably applied earlier by Norwegian whalers operating from South Georgia.
