= A. Duncan Carse =

English artist

- Born: 1875/76; Newcastle upon Tyne, UK
- Died: 1938; Wokingham, UK
- Occupation: artist

Andreas Duncan Carse (1875/76–1938) was an English artist.

== Life ==
Carse was born in 1875 or 1876 in Newcastle upon Tyne to Norwegian and Scottish parents. His two large works Birds of the Old World and Birds of the New World were selected by Cunard in 1933 to be on their new flagship liner, the Queen Mary. Documents are held in the National Archive. He illustrated the Hans Christian Andersen Fairytales 1912 edition. and the Lucy M. Scott Dewdrops from Fairyland 1912. He exhibited with the British Council at the Biennale in 1912.

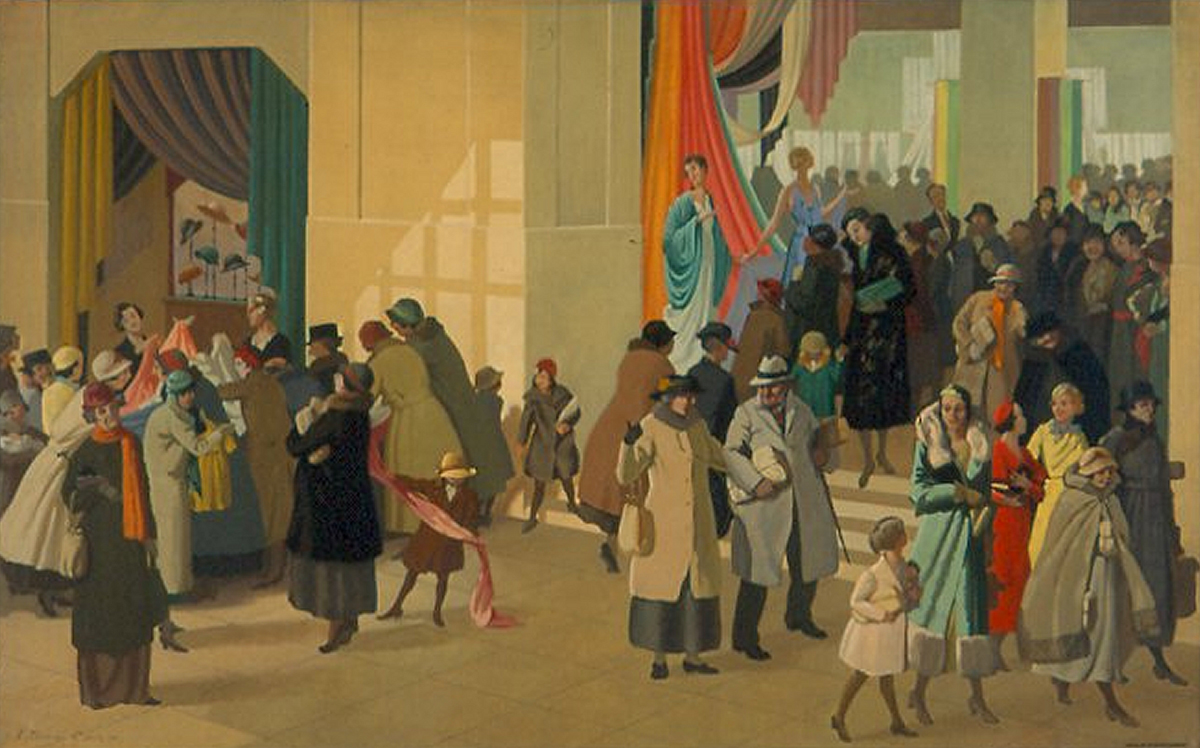
Bargain Hunters by A. Duncan Carse. Now in Reading Museum

Carse exhibited at the Royal Academy in 1904 and then regularly between 1922 and 1938. He also exhibited at the Fine Art Society, the London Salon and the Walker Art Gallery in Liverpool. Carse created paintings to decorate a ceiling at the Detroit Athletic Club with over 1,000 different figures before the First World War. The paintings were covered at the club but they were on show again after a remodeling of the club in 1999.

He died in 1938 in Wokingham, Berkshire. A memorial exhibition was held at Reading Art Gallery in January 1939.

== Family ==
His son was the explorer Duncan Carse.
