= Bore (South Georgia) =

Bay of the South Atlantic Ocean on the coast of South Georgia

Bore (54°16′S 37°10′W) is a small cove indenting the mid part of Jossac Bight on the south coast of South Georgia. Surveyed by the SGS in the period 1951–57. The name is well established in local use.
