= Keilhau Glacier =

Glacier in Antarctica

- Location within South Georgia Island
- Location: South Georgia
- Coordinates: 54°16′S 37°4′W
- Length: 5 nmi (9 km; 6 mi)
- Thickness: unknown
- Terminus: Jossac Bight
- Status: unknown

Keilhau Glacier (54°16′S 37°4′W) is a glacier 5 nautical miles (9 km) long flowing west from Kohl Plateau and then southwest to Jossac Bight, on the south coast of South Georgia. It was mapped by Olaf Holtedahl during his visit to South Georgia in 1927–28, and named by him for Baltazar M. Keilhau, a Norwegian geologist and professor of mineralogy at the University of Christiania.

== See also ==
- List of glaciers in the Antarctic
- Glaciology
