= Amund Helland =

Norwegian geologist, politician and non-fiction writer

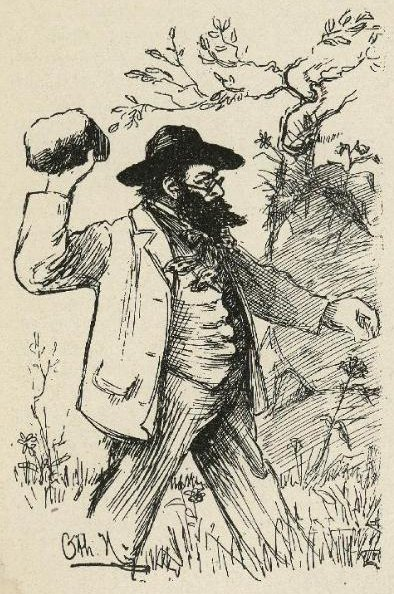
- Drawing of Amund Helland by Othar Holmboe.
- Born: 11 October 1846
- Died: 15 November 1918 (aged 72)
- Occupations: Geologist, Glaciologist
- Known for: Works on glacial erosion. Norges Land og Folk (book series)

Amund Helland (11 October 1846 – 15 November 1918) was a Norwegian geologist, politician and non-fiction writer. He is particularly known for his works on glacial erosion and the role of glaciers in the formation of valleys, fjords and lakes. He is also known for starting the series Norges Land og Folk, published in 20 volumes from 1885 to 1921.

== Personal life ==
Helland was born in Bergen as the son of merchant Hans Helland (1817–1859) and Karen Marie Folkedal. He had six siblings. When his father died in 1859, his mother earned the family's living by running a pension. He died in Kristiania in 1918.

== Career ==
Helland was a student from 1864, and graduated as cand.min. in 1868. In his early career he made excursions to Greenland, Iceland and other European countries. In his first work, the monography Ertsforekomster i Søndhordland og Forekomster af Kise i visse Skifere i Norge from 1871, he claimed unconventional views which were not appreciated by elder colleagues. His pioneering works on glacial erosion and the role of glaciers in the formation of valleys, fjords and lakes, from the mid-1870s, have later become classics. His views on glacial erosion opposed the mainstream theories of the time, but have later been adopted in the geological sciences. He also suggested that the deposits on the North European Plain and the North Sea shelf originated from erosion of Scandinavian fjords. In 1878 he published a popular book on the structure of Earth, Om Jordklodens Bygning. From 1879 he lectured in mining operations, and he was appointed extraordinary professor in 1885. He published a book on the Kongsberg Silver Mines, Kongsbergs sølværks drift før og nu, in 1885, three volumes of a handbook of mining, Haandbog i grubedrift, in 1887. and Norsk bergret med udsigt over andre lands bergværkslovgivning from 1892. His works on soils include Jordbunden i Norge from 1893, Jordbunden i Jarlsberg og Larviks Amt from 1894, and Jordbunden i Romsdals Amt from 1895. Other geological works include Lakis kratere og lavastrømme from 1886 and Lofoten og Vesteraalen from 1897. He initiated the monumental work Norges Land og Folk, a book series published from 1885 until after his death. He was a member of Nordlendingenes Forening and in 1912 he was awarded the Petter Dass Metal (Petter Dass-medaljen).

The mountain of Hellandfjellet at Prins Karls Forland, Svalbard, is named after him, as is the Helland Glacier of South Georgia.

== Selected works ==
- Norges land og folk. (1885-1921; 20 volumes)
