= Skontorp Rock =

Geographical feature in Antarctica

Skontorp Rock (54°30′S 36°43′W) is a rock lying 1 nautical mile (1.9 km) west of the north part of Rocky Bay, off the south coast of South Georgia. Positioned by the SGS in the period 1951–57. Named by the United Kingdom Antarctic Place-Names Committee (UK-APC) for Edvard Skontorp, a gunner of Tonsberg Hvalfangeri, Husvik, 1920–26.
