= Donald Thomas Anderson =

English zoologist

Donald Thomas Anderson AO FRS
- Born: 29 December 1939 (age 86); Eton, Berkshire
- Occupation: Zoologist

Donald Thomas Anderson AO FRS (born 29 December 1939 Eton, Berkshire) is an English zoologist, lecturer at King's College London, and Challis Professor of Biology at University of Sydney. He is currently based in Australia.

He married Joanne Claridge in 1960.

== Awards ==
- 1977 Fellow of the Royal Society
- 1978 Clarke Medal
- 1986 Officer of the Order of Australia (AO) (Australia Day 1986 Honours List)
- 2001 A.O. Kowalevsky Medal

== Works ==
- Atlas of invertebrate anatomy, UNSW Press, 1996, ISBN 978-0-86840-207-9
- Barnacles: structure, function, development and evolution, Springer, 1994, ISBN 9780412444203
- Embryology and phylogeny in annelids and arthropods, Pergamon Press, 1973, ISBN 978-0-08-017069-5
- Invertebrate zoology, Editor Donald Thomas Anderson, Oxford University Press, 1998, ISBN 978-0-19-553941-7

Awards
Preceded by Alec Trendall	Clarke Medal; 1978	Succeeded by Lawrence Alexander Sidney Johnson
