= Diamond Mountain (disambiguation) =

Mount Kumgang (Korean: 금강산; lit. 'Diamond Mountain') is a mountain in North Korea.

Diamond Mountain may also refer to:

- Diamond Mountain District AVA, an American Viticultural Area located in California
- Diamond Mountain Center, a Tibetan Buddhist seminary and retreat center located in Arizona

== See also ==
- Diamond Mountains
- Diamond Hill (disambiguation)
- Diamond Peak (disambiguation)
