= Smoky Wall =

Mountain in South Georgia

Smoky Wall (54°35′S 36°11′W) is a prominent mountain block, 1,840 m, in the northwest part of the Salvesen Range of South Georgia. The name "Wetterwand" (weather wall) was given to this mountain by the German group of the International Polar Year Investigations, 1882–83, but the name did not become established. The feature was surveyed by the SGS, 1951–52, who reported that when viewed from the northeast, its summit is level and regular and has the appearance of a wall. The descriptive name Smoky Wall was recommended by the United Kingdom Antarctic Place-Names Committee (UK-APC) in 1954.
