= Esmark Glacier =

Glacier in Antarctica

- Location within South Georgia Island
- Location: South Georgia
- Coordinates: 54°13′S 37°13′W
- Thickness: unknown
- Terminus: Jossac Bight
- Status: unknown

Esmark Glacier is a glacier flowing into the west part of Jossac Bight on the south coast of South Georgia. It was named by the Norwegian expedition under Olaf Holtedahl, 1927–28, most likely for Jens Esmark, professor of mineralogy at the University of Kristiania (Oslo), Norway. To the northwest is Mount Cunningham.

== See also ==
- List of glaciers in the Antarctic
- Glaciology
