= Müller Point =

Coordinates: 54°41′S 35°55′W

Müller Point is a point on the east coast of South Georgia, forming the east limit of Iris Bay. Surveyed by the SGS in the period 1951–57, and named by the United Kingdom Antarctic Place-Names Committee (UK-APC) for Johannes Müller, Second Officer and navigator of the Deutschland during the German Antarctic Expedition, 1911–12. His survey and astronomical fixes included the mapping of this point and resulted in considerable improvements to the existing maps of South Georgia.
