= Jason Harbour =

Bay in South Georgia

Coordinates: 54°11′S 36°35′W

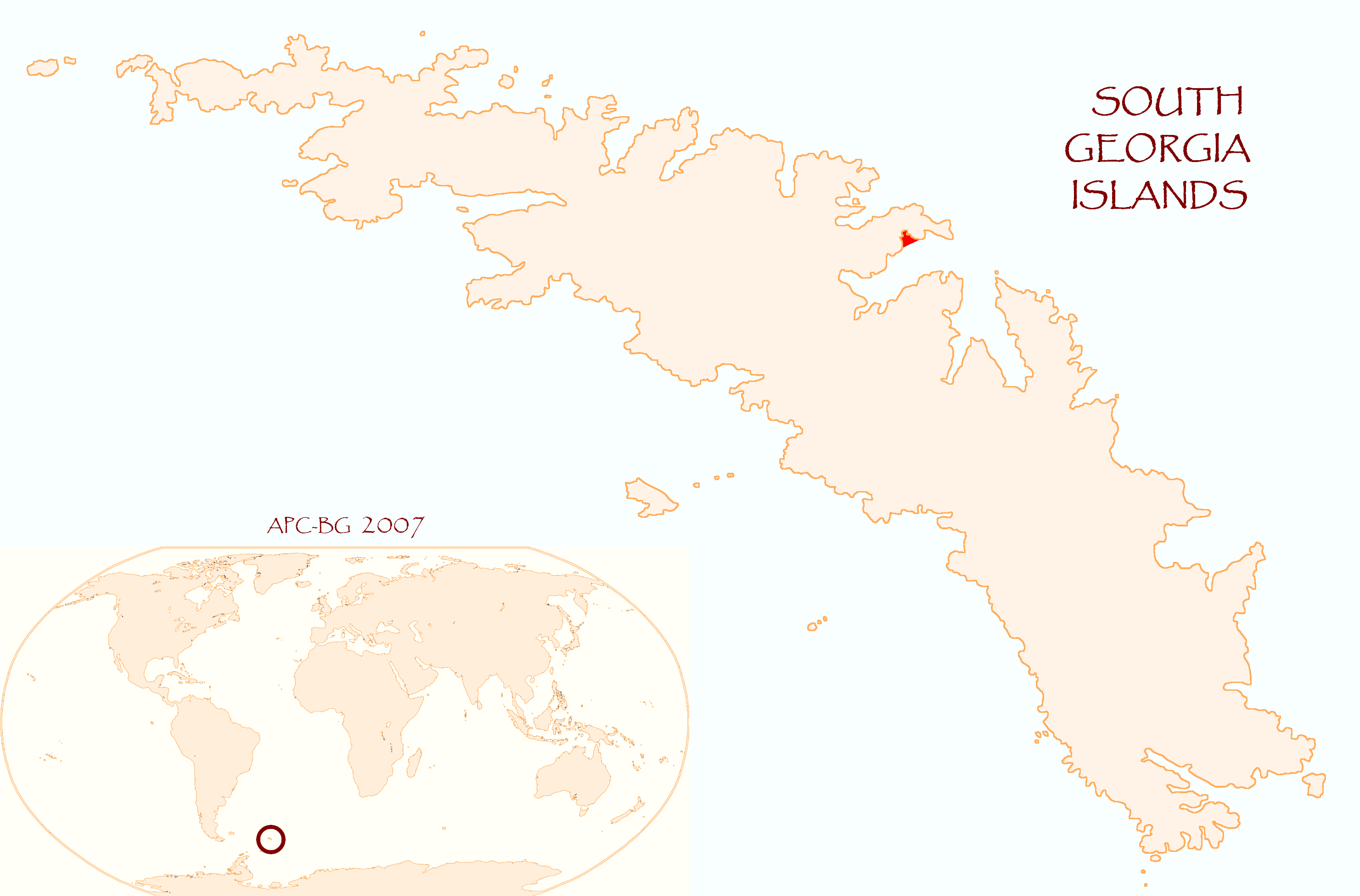

Jason Harbour is a bay 1 mile (1.6 km) wide, lying west of Allen Bay in the north side of Cumberland West Bay, South Georgia. It was charted and named by the Swedish Antarctic Expedition, 1901–04, under Otto Nordenskiöld. The bay was previously visited by the Jason, Captain C.A. Larsen, in 1894.

== Named features ==
Several features in and around Jason Harbour have been charted by various Antarctic expeditions. Unless otherwise noted, the following features were charted and named by Discovery Investigations (DI) personnel in 1929.

Boat Harbor is a small circular harbour on the east coast of Jason Harbour. The name appears to be first used on a 1930 British Admiralty chart. A group of rocks called the Breakwater Rocks extends across the south part of the entrance to Boat Harbour. The feature was initially named The Breakwater, probably by Lieutenant Commander J.M. Chaplin, Royal Navy, during his survey of Jason Harbour in 1929. The South Georgia Survey (SGS) of 1956–1957, reported that the name was misleading; the rocks are not in a continuous straight line forming a natural breakwater, but are in a group. The name was therefore altered to "Breakwater Rocks" by the UK Antarctic Place-Names Committee (UK-APC) in 1957.

Wood Point marks the entrance of Little Jason Lagoon to the north. Little Jason Lagoon, a near-circular lagoon 0.4 nautical miles (0.7 km) sits at the head of the harbour, separated from it by a narrow peninsula. So narrow is the channel into Little Jason Lagoon that it was initially named Nogood Lagoon by DI personnel. The SGS of 1951–1952, reported that the feature is known locally as Little Jason. The name Little Jason Lagoon was approved in order to indicate the nature of the feature, and at the same time to conform with local usage. The narrow peninsula separating the lagoon from the harbour ends in Lagoon Point, first called Bluff Point by DI but renamed on a 1930 British Admiralty chart. On the same narrow peninsula as Lagoon Point sits The Split Pin, a twin pinnacle rock formation 12 m (39 ft) high, also charted by DI.

Tor Point forms the east side of the entrance to Jason Harbor. The name appears to be first used on a 1930 British Admiralty chart. Diamond Peak rises to the west of the harbor.
