= Alec Trendall =

English geologist, poet, and explorer

- Born: 8 December 1928; Enfield, Middlesex
- Died: 4 April 2013 (aged 84)
- Education: PhD (University of Liverpool)
- Alma mater: Imperial College London
- Occupations: geologist, poet, and explorer
- Known for: Director of the Geological Survey of Western Australia
- Scientific career
- Thesis: The origin of albite gneisses
- Doctoral advisor: Robert Shackleton

Alec Trendall (8 December 1928 – 4 April 2013) was an English geologist, poet, and explorer. He is known for his work in mapping the island of South Georgia and for surveying the geology of Western Australia.

== Early life ==
Alec Trendall was born in 1928 at Enfield, Middlesex, and in 1949 graduated in geology at Imperial College, London. He has a PhD degree from Liverpool University.

== Exploration ==
Trendall was the geologist on the 1951–52 and 1953–54 South Georgia Survey expeditions led by Duncan Carse. Trendall Crag, 1,005 m, overlooking the north side of Drygalski Fjord at the southeast end of South Georgia, was named to commemorate Alec Trendall's contribution. In 2011 he published a full account of the survey expeditions, entitled Putting South Georgia on the Map.

The Scott Polar Research Institute's digitised archive includes 305 images of Trendall including images of a bergschrund – a hole in an ice sheet – which Trendall fell down before being carried on an improvised sled, to leave the First expedition.

== Geological Survey of Western Australia ==
Trendall was Director of the Geological Survey of Western Australia from 1969 to 1989. Trendall discovered the locality known as Trendall Reserve, Eastern Pilbara in 1984. It contains convincing evidence of some of the oldest known fossils known as stromatolites.

Awards
Preceded by Lilian Ross Fraser	Clarke Medal; 1977	Succeeded by Donald Thomas Anderson
