= Diamond Hill (disambiguation) =

Diamond Hill is a hill and its surrounding residential district in Kowloon, Hong Kong.

Diamond Hill may also refer to:

- Chief Vann House Historic Site
- Diamond Hill station in Diamond Hill, Kowloon, Hong Kong
- Diamond Hill (Antarctica), a large hill
- Diamond Hill (Cumberland, Rhode Island), a large hill
- Diamond Hill Historic District, Lynchburg, Virginia, United States
- Diamond Hill-Jarvis High School, Fort Worth, Texas, United States
- Diamond Hill in Transvaal, South Africa, where the British and the Boers fought the Battle of Diamond Hill
- Diamond Hill (Ireland) in Letterfrack, Ireland, part of the Connemara National Park

== See also ==
- Diamond Mountain (disambiguation)
- Diamond Peak (disambiguation)
- Diamond Head, Hawaii
