= Mount Mair =

Mountain in South Georgia

Mount Mair (54°49′S 36°2′W) is a mountain rising to 780 m between Brandt Cove and Larsen Harbor, Drygalski Fjord, South Georgia. Named by United Kingdom Antarctic Place-Names Committee (UK-APC) after Bruce F. Mair, British Antarctic Survey (BAS) geologist, who carried out extensive geological mapping in the area in the 1974–75 and 1976-77 field seasons.
