= Iris Bay =

Coordinates: 54°42′S 35°56′W

Iris Bay is a small bay immediately south of Muller Point at the east end of South Georgia, lying 6 miles (10 km) northwest of Cape Vahsel, along the embayment between Cape Vahsel and Cape Charlotte. The name "Sandwich Bay", for John Montagu, 4th Earl of Sandwich, was given to the whole embayment between Cape Vahsel and Cape Charlotte in 1775 by a British expedition under James Cook. The name was later restricted on maps to the small bay described, since a name for the large embayment was not considered useful. The South Georgia Survey, 1951–52, reported that the name Iris Bay for the same feature is well established in use among the whalers and sealers in South Georgia, and that the name Sandwich Bay is unknown locally, so Iris Bay was approved to conform with local usage.
