= Queen Maud Bay =

Body of water in Antarctica

Queen Maud Bay is a V-shaped bay 2.5 miles (4.0 km) wide at the entrance, lying immediately north of Nuñez Peninsula along the south coast of South Georgia. Roughly charted in 1819 by a Russian expedition under Bellingshausen, it was named prior to 1922 for Queen Maud, wife of King Haakon VII of Norway, probably by Norwegian whalers who frequented this coast.

Shallop Cove (54°14′S 37°20′W) forms the head of Queen Maud Bay. It was surveyed by the South Georgia Survey (SGS) in the period 1951–57, and named because the shipwreck of an unknown shallop was found here by the SGS in 1956.

Hammerstad Reef (54°13′S 37°25′W) is a reef 1.5 nautical miles (3 km) lying in the northern part of the entrance to the bay. Semla Reef lies on the north side.
