= Diamond Peak (Arizona) =

Landform in the Grand Canyon, Arizona

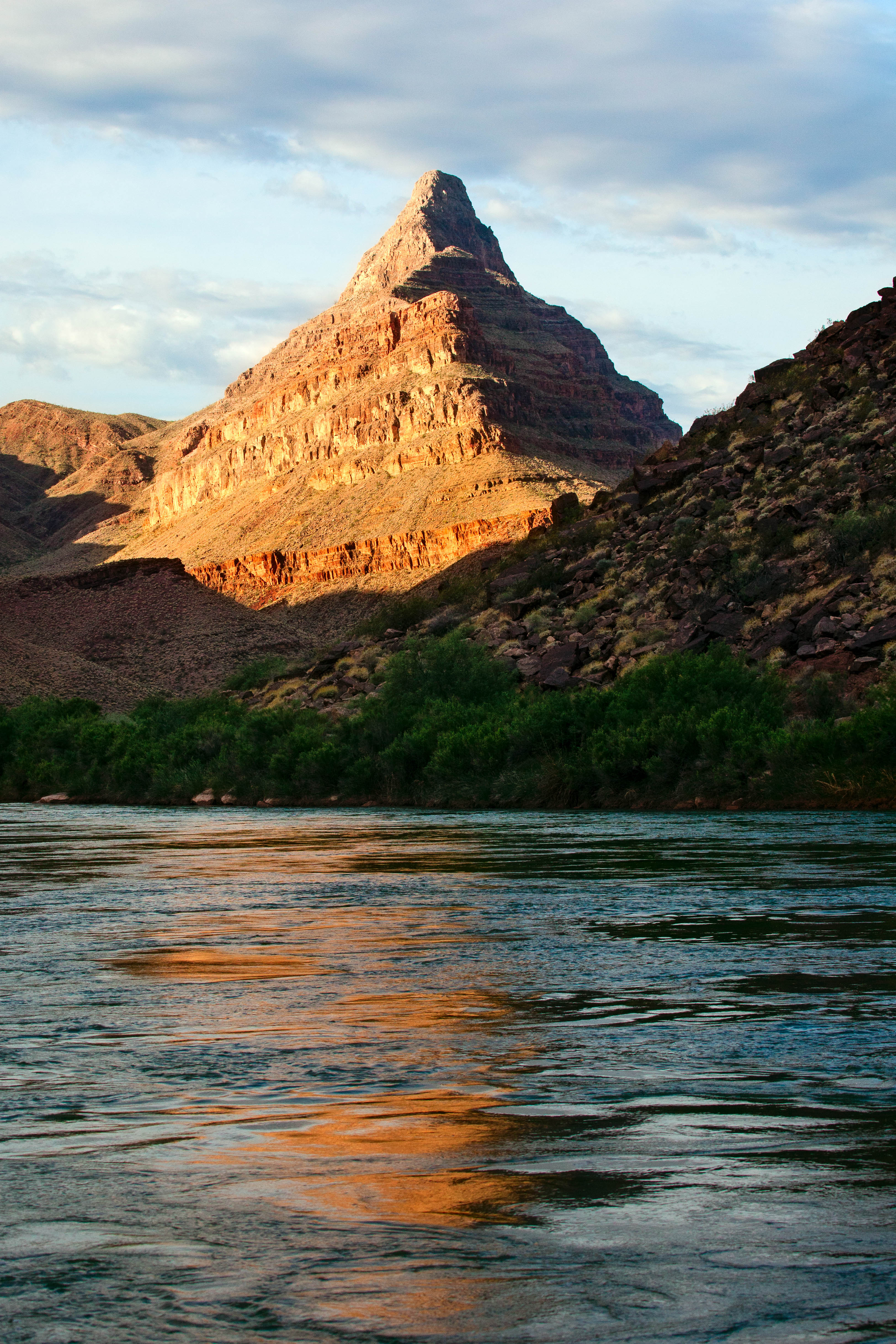
- North aspect, from the Colorado River

Highest point
- Elevation: 3,512 ft (1,070 m)
- Prominence: 852 ft (260 m)
- Isolation: 1.52 mi (2.45 km)
- Coordinates: 35°46′03″N 113°21′14″W

Geography
- Location within Arizona Location within the United States
- Location: Hualapai Indian Reservation; Mohave County, Arizona, US
- Parent range: Colorado Plateau
- Topo map: USGS Diamond Peak

Geology
- Rock type: limestone

Climbing
- First ascent: May 14, 1967 by Harvey Butchart, Reider Peterson

Diamond Peak is a 3,512-foot-elevation (1,070 meter) summit located in the western end of the Grand Canyon, on the Hualapai Indian Reservation in Mohave County of northwestern Arizona, United States. This double summit landmark is situated at the mouth of Peach Springs Canyon, where Diamond Creek meets the Colorado River. This peak is an erosional remnant composed of Cambrian Muav Limestone and Mississippian Redwall Limestone. Topographic relief is significant as Diamond Peak towers 2,200 feet above the Colorado River in one-half mile. According to the Köppen climate classification system, Diamond Peak is located in a desert climate zone.

== History ==
In 1858, Lieutenant Joseph Ives led an expedition up the Colorado River, starting at the river's mouth and making it to the lower Grand Canyon with a steamboat named Explorer. This steamboat sustained damage when it struck a large rock, now known as Explorer's Rock, in the Colorado River at the mouth of the Black Canyon between Arizona and Nevada. The exploratory party continued overland, and descended into the Grand Canyon via Peach Springs Canyon with the assistance of Hualapai guides. On April 5, 1858, this party spent two days camped near the mouth of Diamond Creek and became the first European Americans known to reach the Colorado River within Grand Canyon. John Strong Newberry was the geologist for the Ives' expedition, and the first geologist to see the Grand Canyon. For his part of the expedition report, Newberry described the first stratigraphic sections of the Grand Canyon and the first description of the fossils. Diamond Peak and Diamond Creek were named by Ives and Newberry.

In his Report upon the Colorado River of the West; Explored in 1857 and 1858, Ives wrote:

"The extent and magnitude of the system of canyons is astounding. The plateau is cut into shreds by these gigantic chasms, and resembles a vast ruin. Belts of country miles in width have been swept away, leaving only isolated mountains standing in the gap. Fissures so profound that the eye cannot penetrate their depths are separated by walls whose thickness one can almost span, and slender spires that seem to be tottering upon their bases shoot up thousands of feet from the vaults below... The region is, of course, altogether valueless. It can be approached only from the south, and after entering it there is nothing to do but leave. Ours has been the first, and will doubtless be the last, party of whites to visit this profitless locality. It seems intended by nature that the Colorado River, along the greater portion of its lonely and majestic way, shall be forever unvisited and undisturbed."

History shows that Ives failed to foresee the alluring adventure of riding the river via raft. Today, most Colorado River rafting adventures through the Grand Canyon terminate at Diamond Peak because of a beach at Diamond Creek and road which provides an easy exit from the lower Grand Canyon. Diamond Peak is the landmark that alerts rafters to this exit point. Diamond Peak is at river mile 225, that being the distance from Lees Ferry, where rafters start their journey.

== Gallery ==
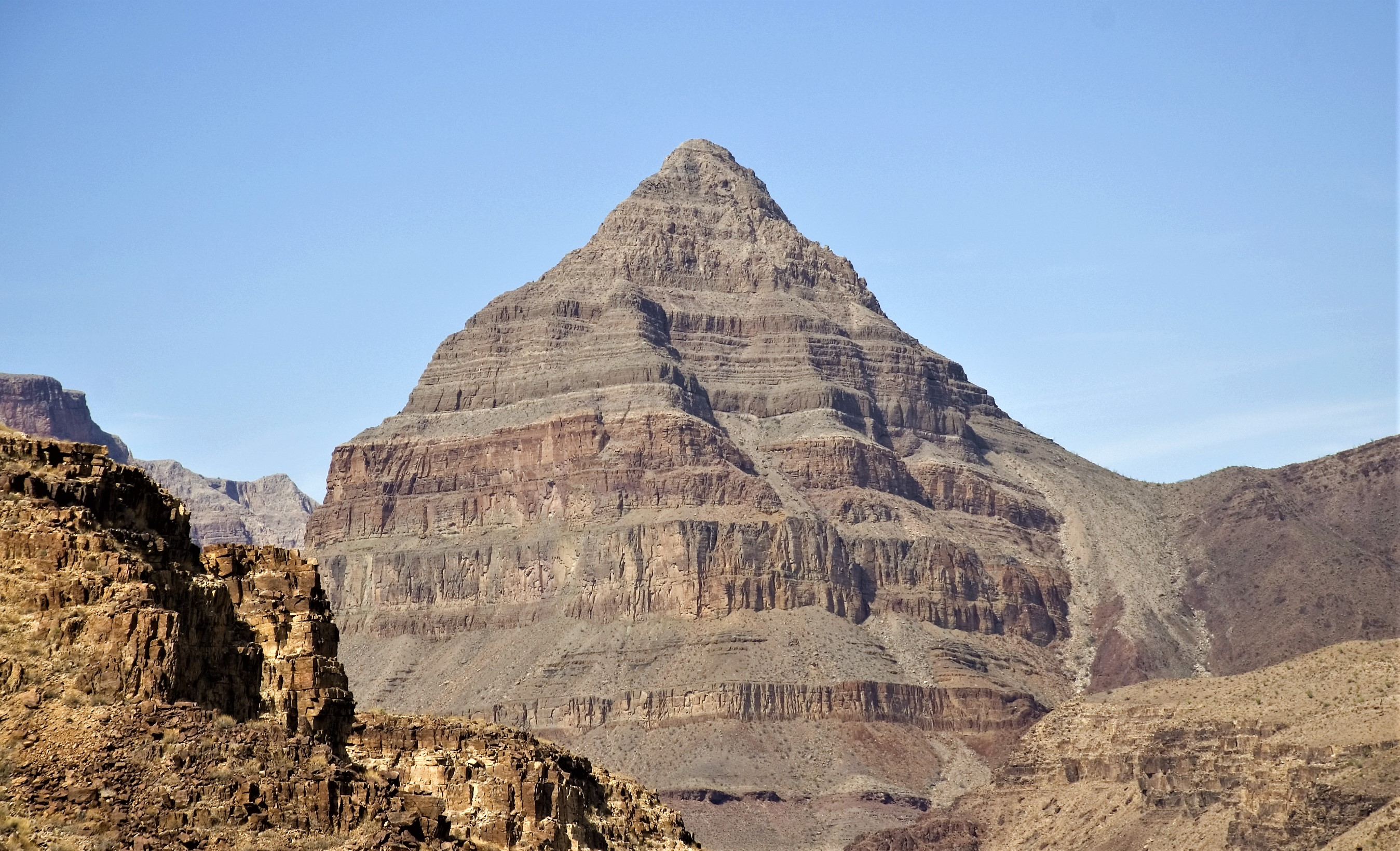
Diamond Peak, south aspect. Muav Limestone overlain by conspicuous cliff-forming Redwall Limestone.

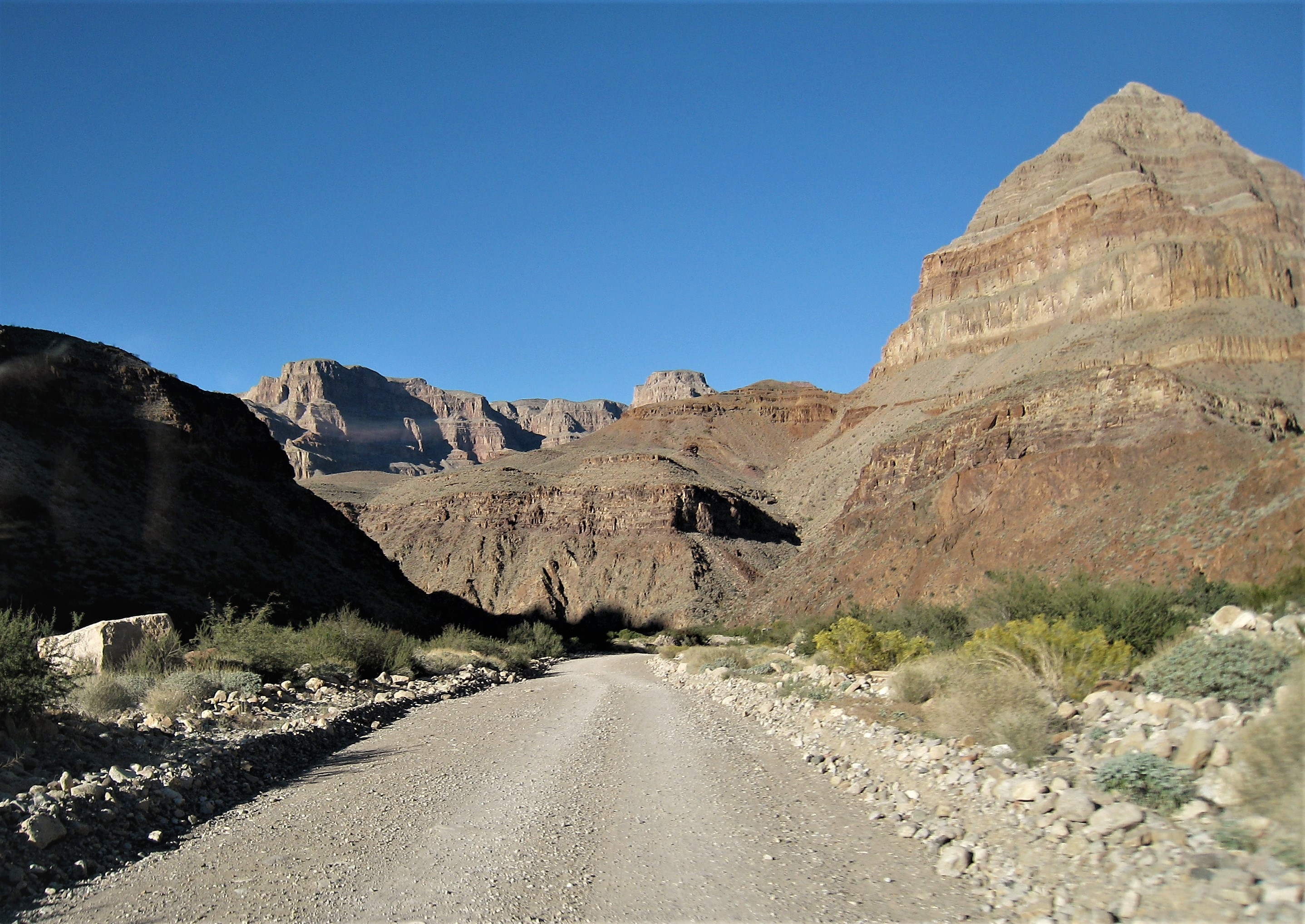
Diamond Creek Road and Diamond Peak

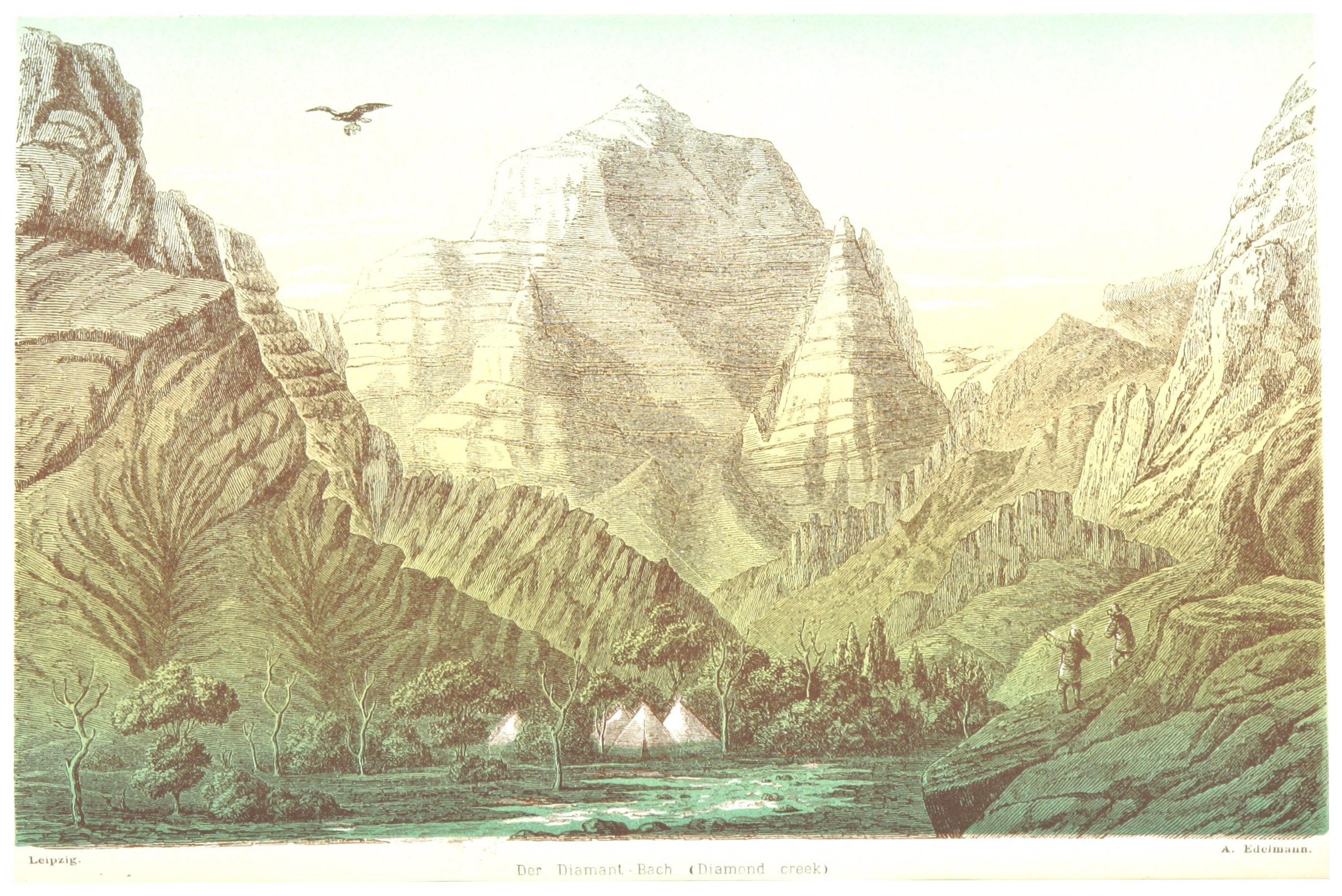
Diamond Beach by Balduin Möllhausen, artist for Ives' expedition

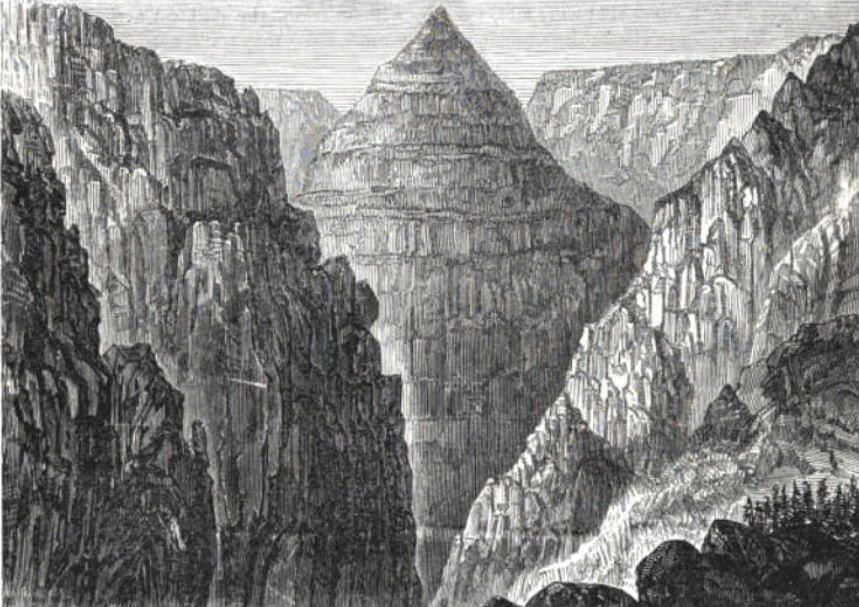
Diamond Peak by Balduin Möllhausen, the artist for Ives' expedition

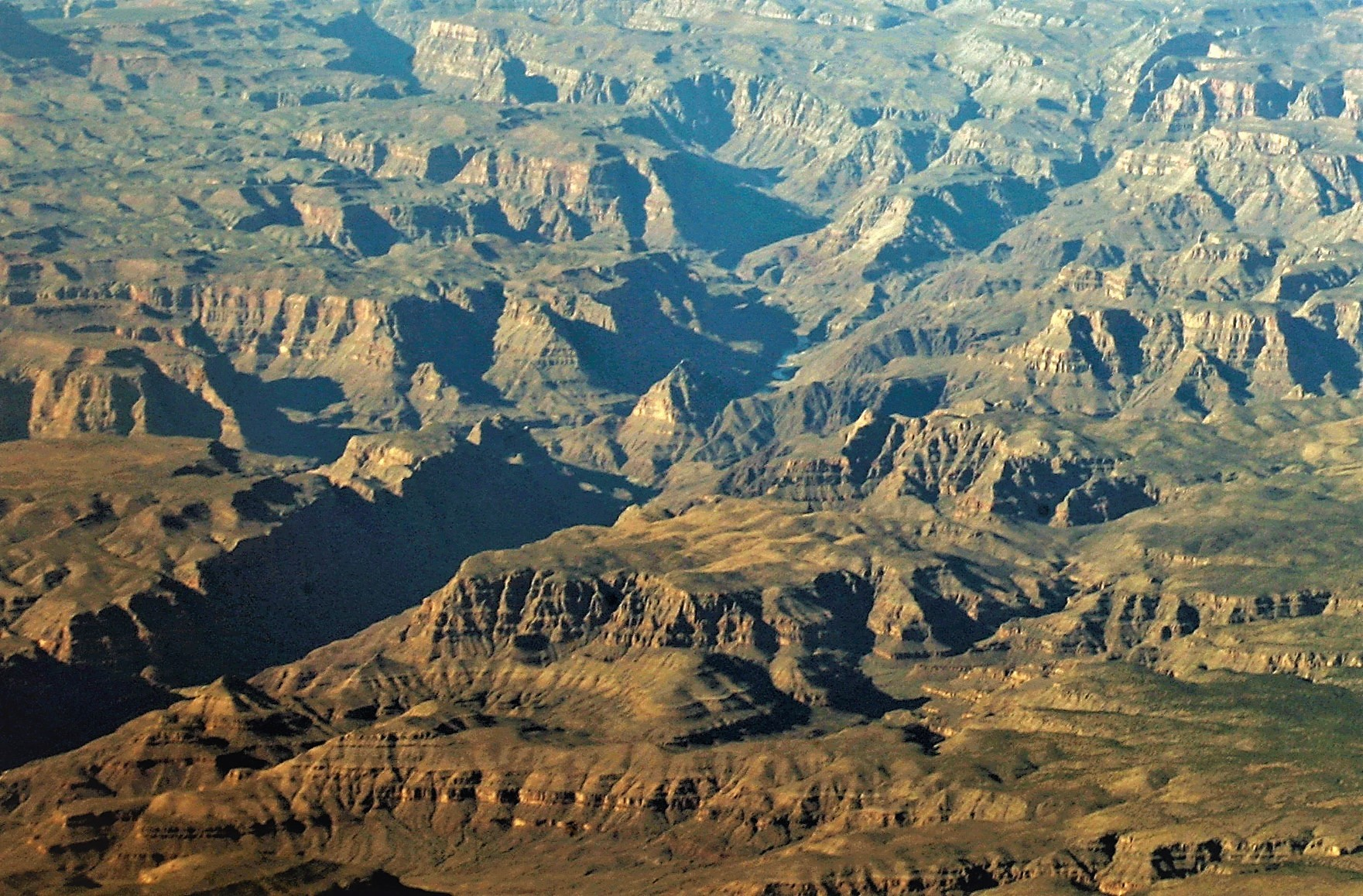
View from airliner looking north with Diamond Peak centered in bullseye

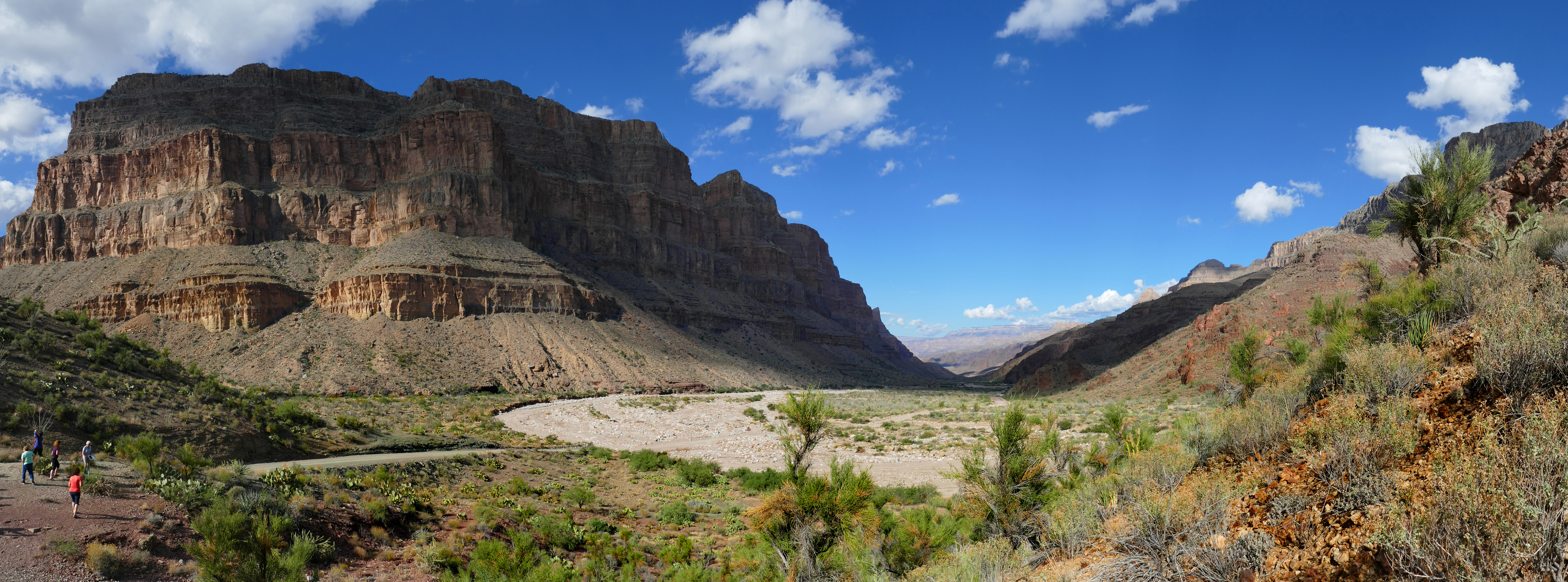
Peach Springs Canyon. Tip of Diamond Peak annotated on file.

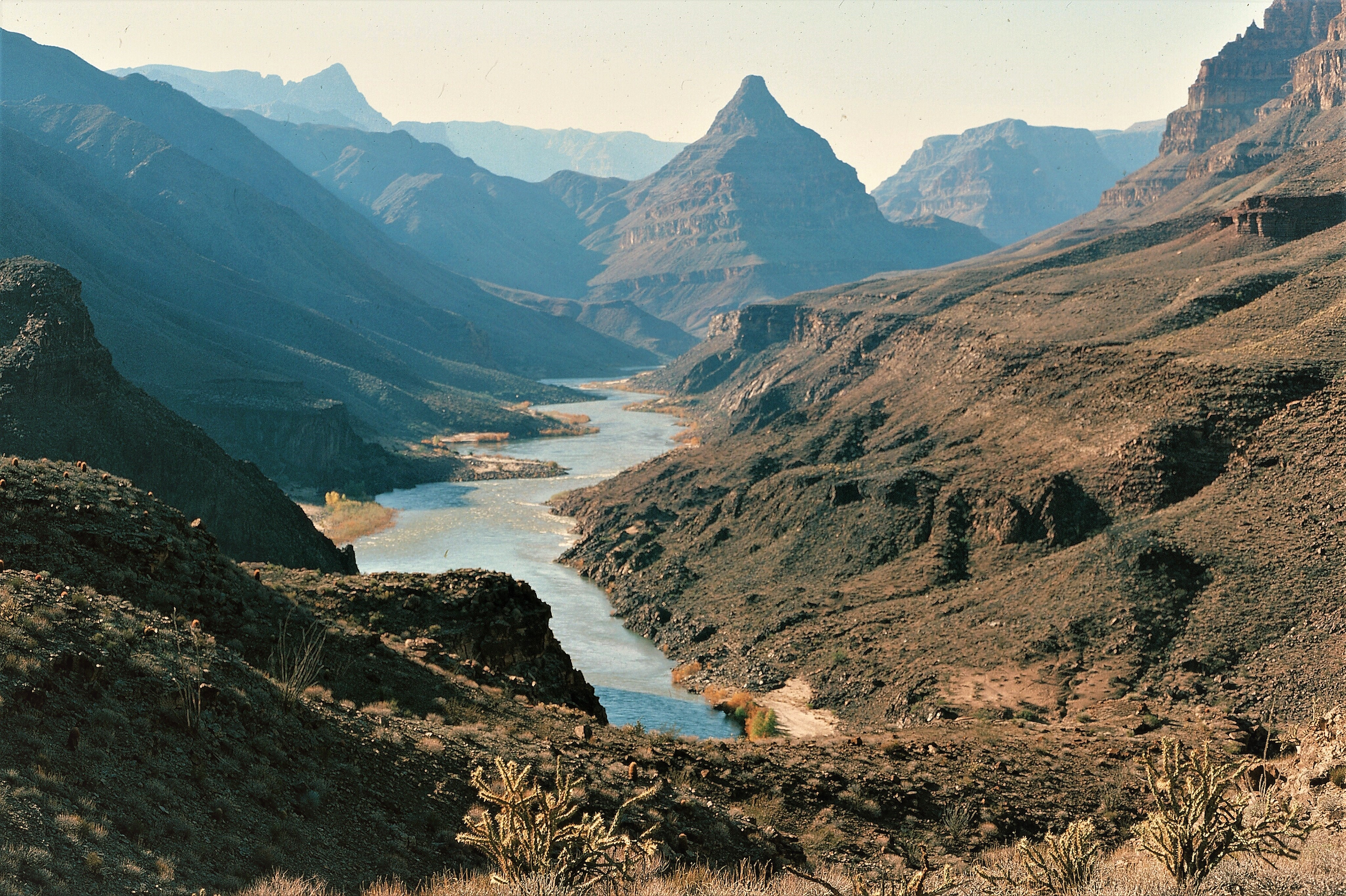
Diamond Peak with Colorado River, from the north

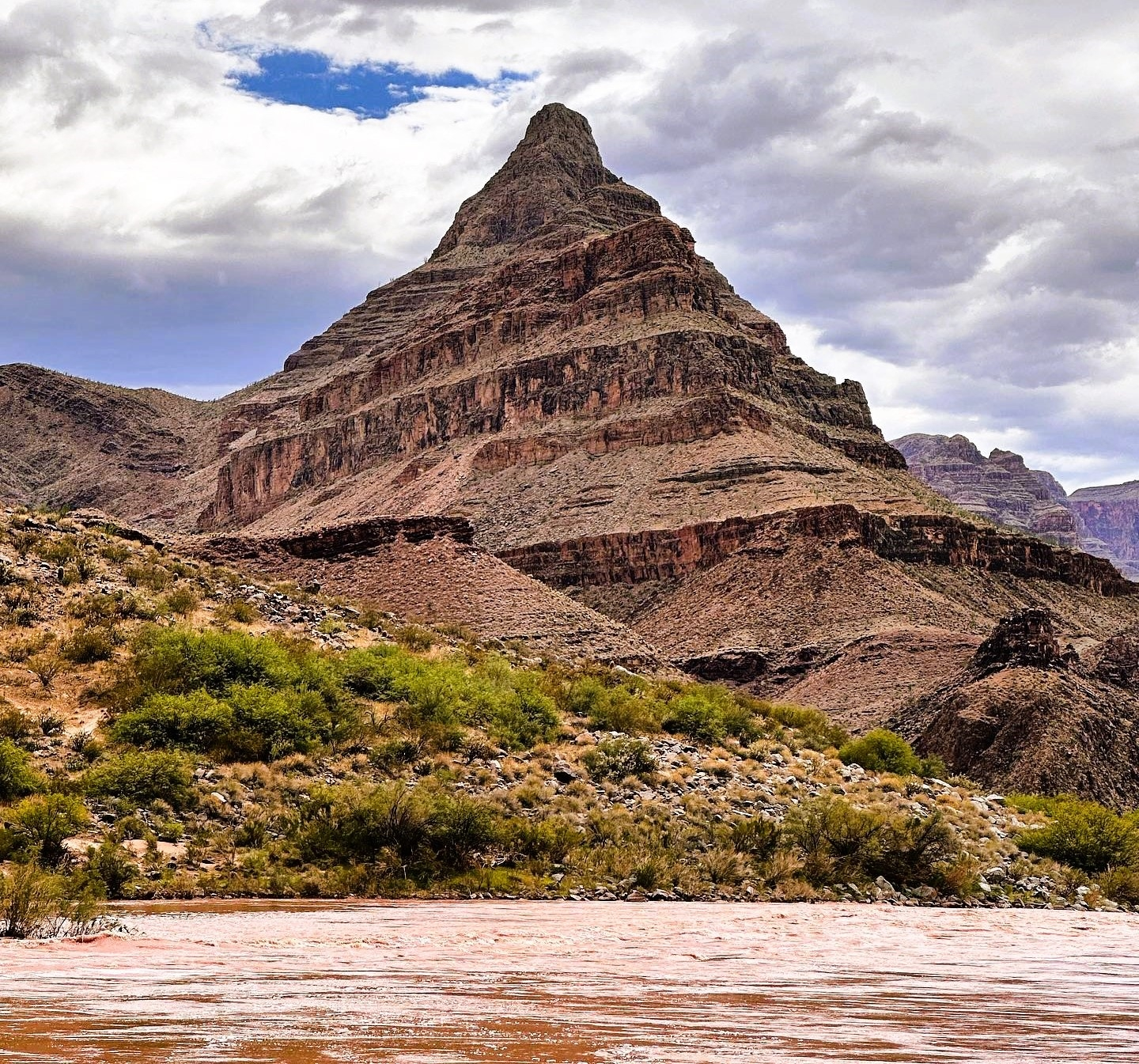

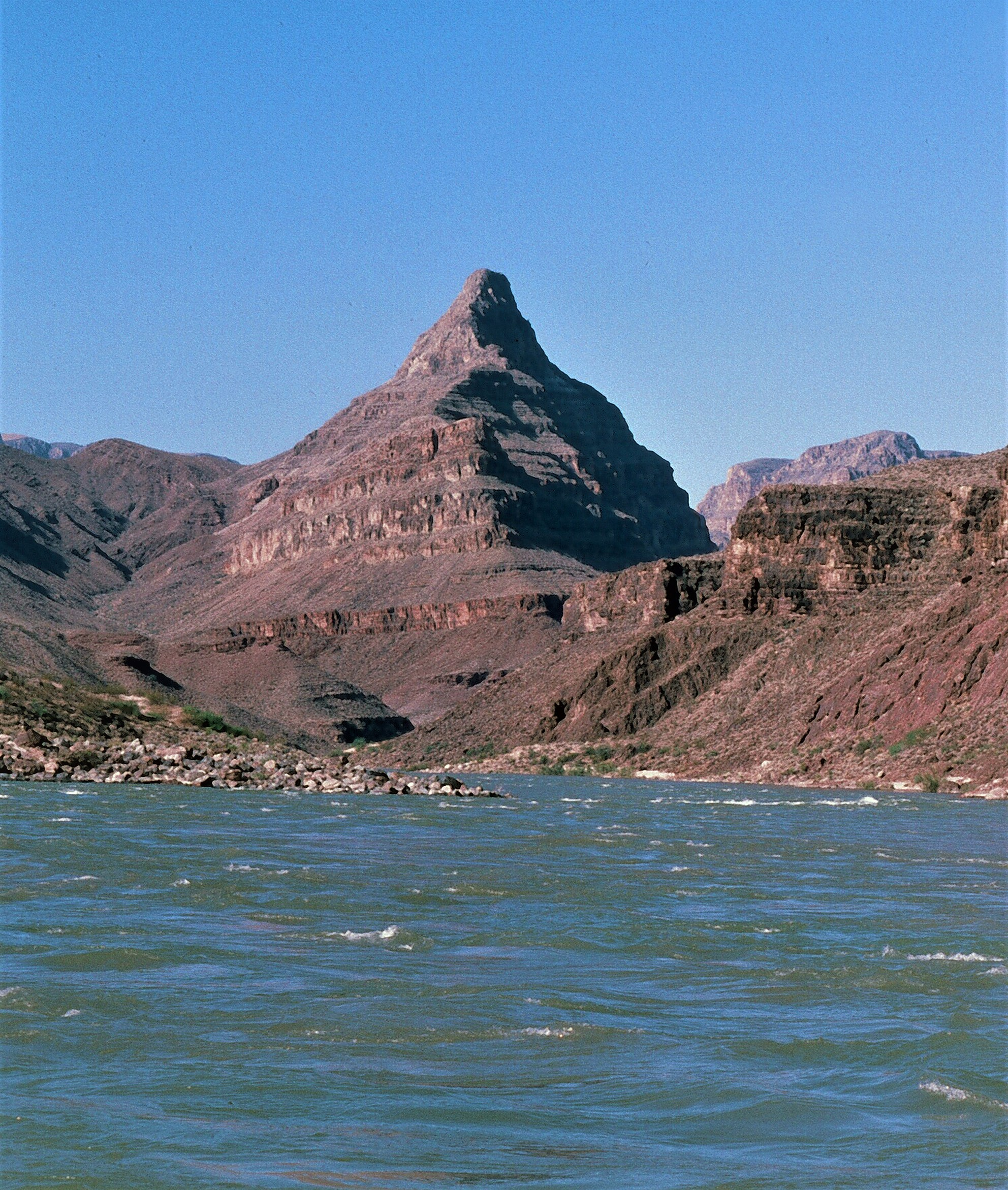

== See also ==
- Geology of the Grand Canyon area
- History of the Grand Canyon area
