= Diamond Peak (South Georgia) =

Peak on the north coast of South Georgia

Diamond Peak (54°12′S 36°39′W) is a peak rising to 610 m west of Jason Harbor, Cumberland West Bay, on the north coast of South Georgia. Charted and named by DI between 1925 and 1929.
