= Mount Carse =

Mountain in South Georgia

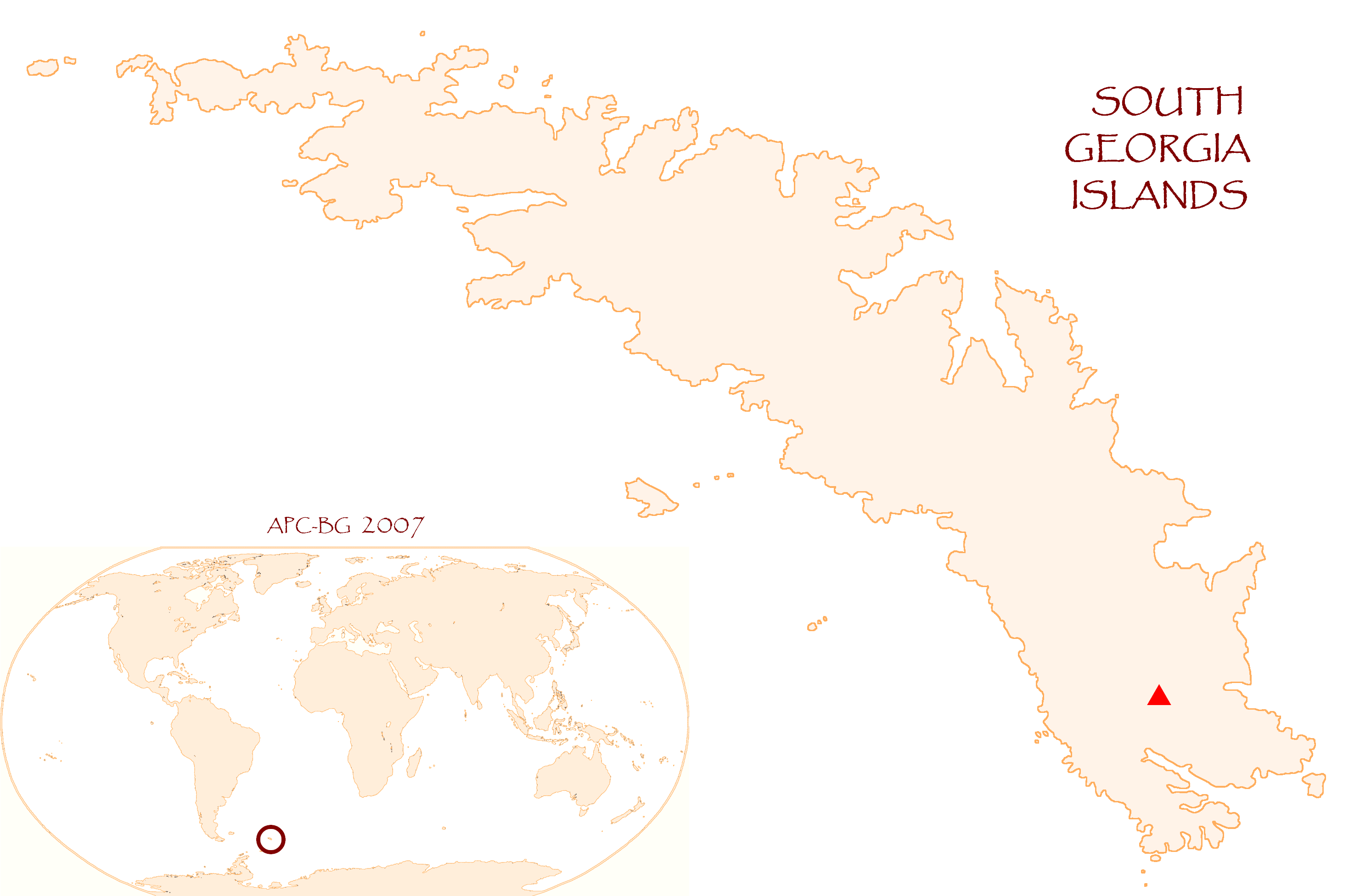
- Location of Mt. Carse

Highest point
- Elevation: 2,330 m (7,640 ft)
- Prominence: 1,720 m (5,640 ft)
- Listing: Ultra, Ribu
- Coordinates: 54°43′S 36°5′W

Geography
- Location: South Georgia
- Parent range: Salvesen Range

Mount Carse is a mountain having several peaks, the highest at 2,330 metres (7,640 ft), standing 2 nautical miles (4 km) north of the head of Drygalski Fjord in the southern part of the Salvesen Range of South Georgia. It was surveyed by the South Georgia Survey (SGS) between 1951 and 1957 and named for V. Duncan Carse, leader of the four SGS expeditions during that period.

The first ascent was made on 21 January 1990 by Brian Davison and Stephen Venables, members of the Southern Ocean Mountaineering Expedition.

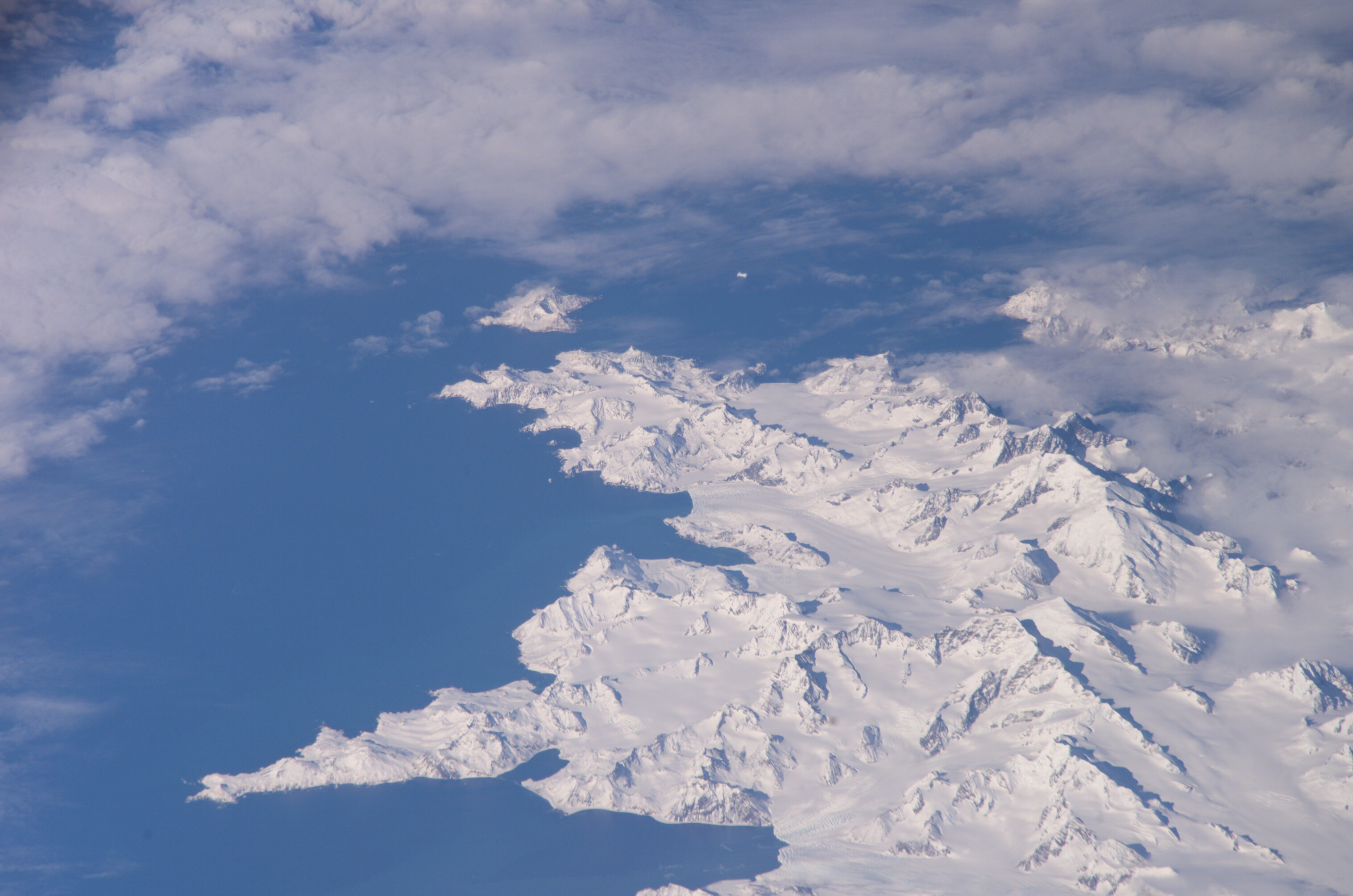
Mount Carse (right) viewed from ISS. Camera pointed south.

== See also ==
- List of ultras of Antarctica

== Literature ==
- 'Island at the Edge of the World' by Stephen Venables. Hodder & Stoughton 1991
