= Hellandfjellet =

Coordinates: 78.742°N 10.781°E

Hellandfjellet is a mountain in Prins Karls Forland, Svalbard. It has a height of 571 m.a.s.l., and is located at the northern part of the island. The mountain is named after Norwegian geologist Amund Helland.
