= Brøgger Glacier =

Glacier in Antarctica

- Location within South Georgia Island
- Location: South Georgia
- Coordinates: 54°10′S 37°8′W
- Length: 7 nmi (13 km; 8 mi)
- Thickness: unknown
- Terminus: Undine South Harbour
- Status: unknown

Brøgger Glacier (54°32′S 36°26′W) is a glacier 7 nautical miles (13 km) long, flowing west into the southern part of Undine South Harbour on the south coast of South Georgia. The name appears on a chart by Professor Olaf Holtedahl, Norwegian geologist who investigated South Georgia in 1928, and is probably for Professor Waldemar Brøgger, a Norwegian geologist and mineralogist, and member of the Norwegian Parliament, 1900–09.

== See also ==
- List of glaciers in the Antarctic
- Glaciology
