= Rocky Bay (South Georgia) =

Body of water in Antarctica

Coordinates: 54°29′S 36°40′W

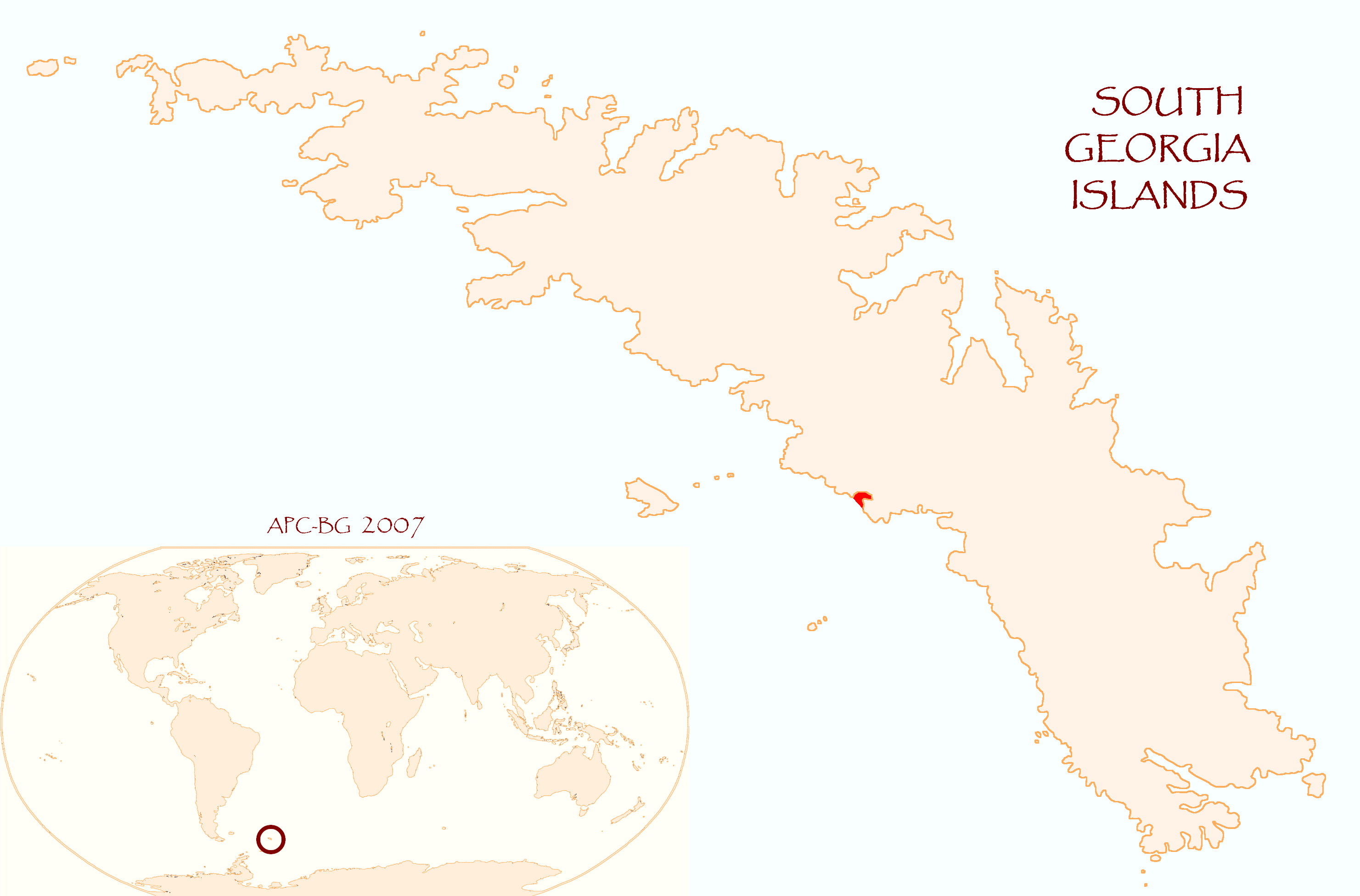
Location of Rocky Bay on South Georgia Island

Rocky Bay is a small bay situated immediately north of Ducloz Head along the south coast of South Georgia. Many rocks lie in the bay and at its entrance, such as Skontorp Rock. The presence of this bay seems to have been first noted in 1819 by Admiral Thaddeus Bellingshausen who roughly charted a small inlet in this approximate position. The name was in use prior to 1930 and was probably applied by sealers and whalers working in the area.
