= Undine South Harbour =

Coordinates: 54°31′S 36°33′W

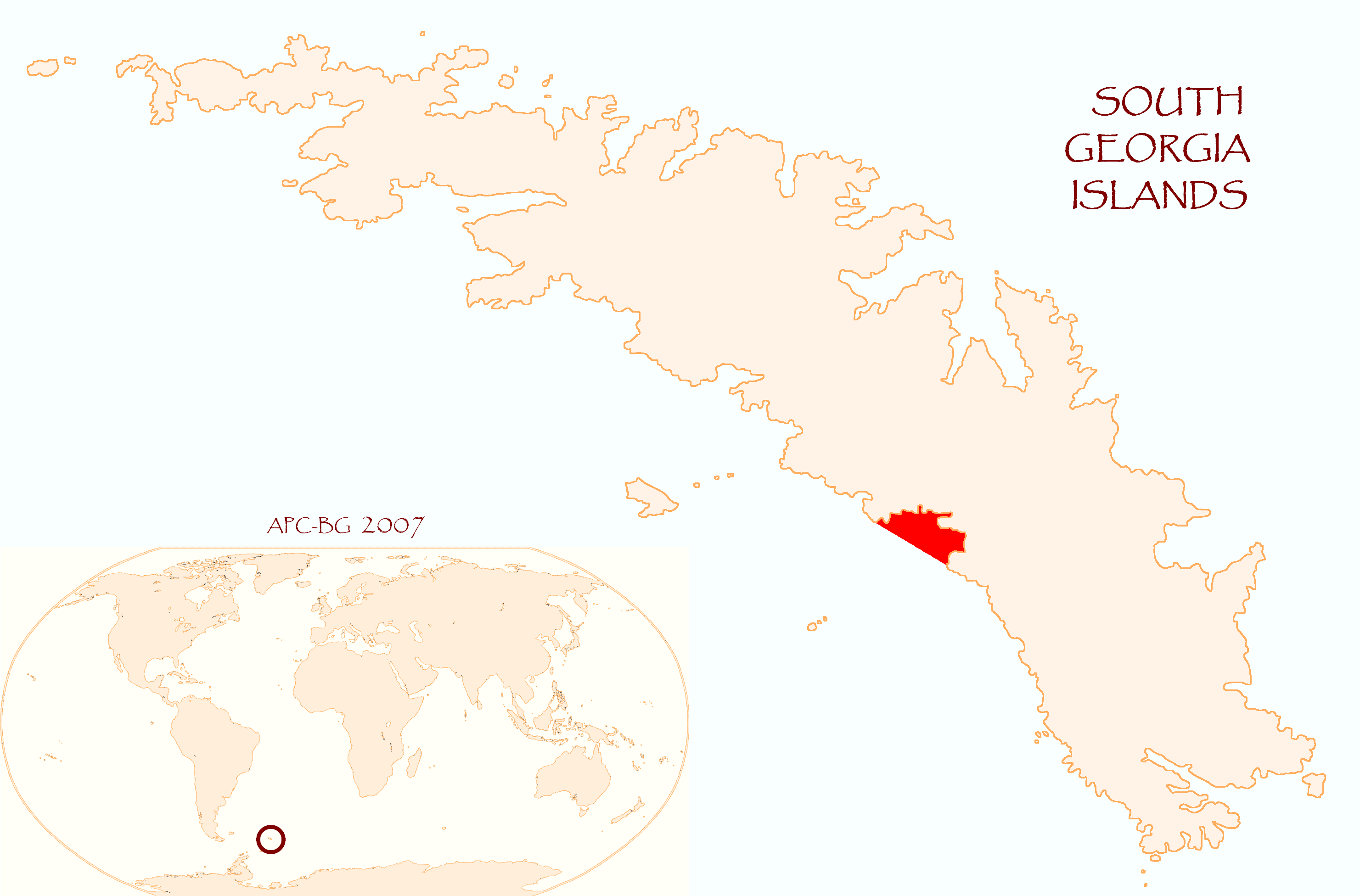
Location of Undine South Harbour

Undine South Harbour is a bay, 6 miles (10 km) wide and indenting 2 miles (3.2 km) between Ducloz Head and Leon Head along the south coast of South Georgia. The name appears to have been given by the German Antarctic Expedition under Filchner, 1911–12. The Pesca was at South Georgia in the 1911–12 season and was made available for use by the Filchner expedition. Austin Head projects into the harbour.
