= Ranvik =

Ranvik (54°48′S 36°15′W) is a cove 3.5 nautical miles (6 km) southeast of Diaz Cove along the south coast of South Georgia. Surveyed by the SGS in the period 1951–1957. The name is well established in local use.
