= Salomon Glacier =

Glacier in Antarctica

- Location within South Georgia Island
- Location: South Georgia
- Coordinates: 54°47′S 35°54′W
- Thickness: unknown
- Terminus: Hamilton Bay
- Status: unknown

Salomon Glacier (54°47′S 35°54′W) is a glacier flowing south into Hamilton Bay, at the east end of South Georgia. Named by the German Antarctic Expedition under Wilhelm Filchner, 1911–12.

== See also ==
- List of glaciers in the Antarctic
- Glaciology
