= Drygalski Fjord =

Bay in South Georgia

Coordinates: 54°49′S 36°0′W

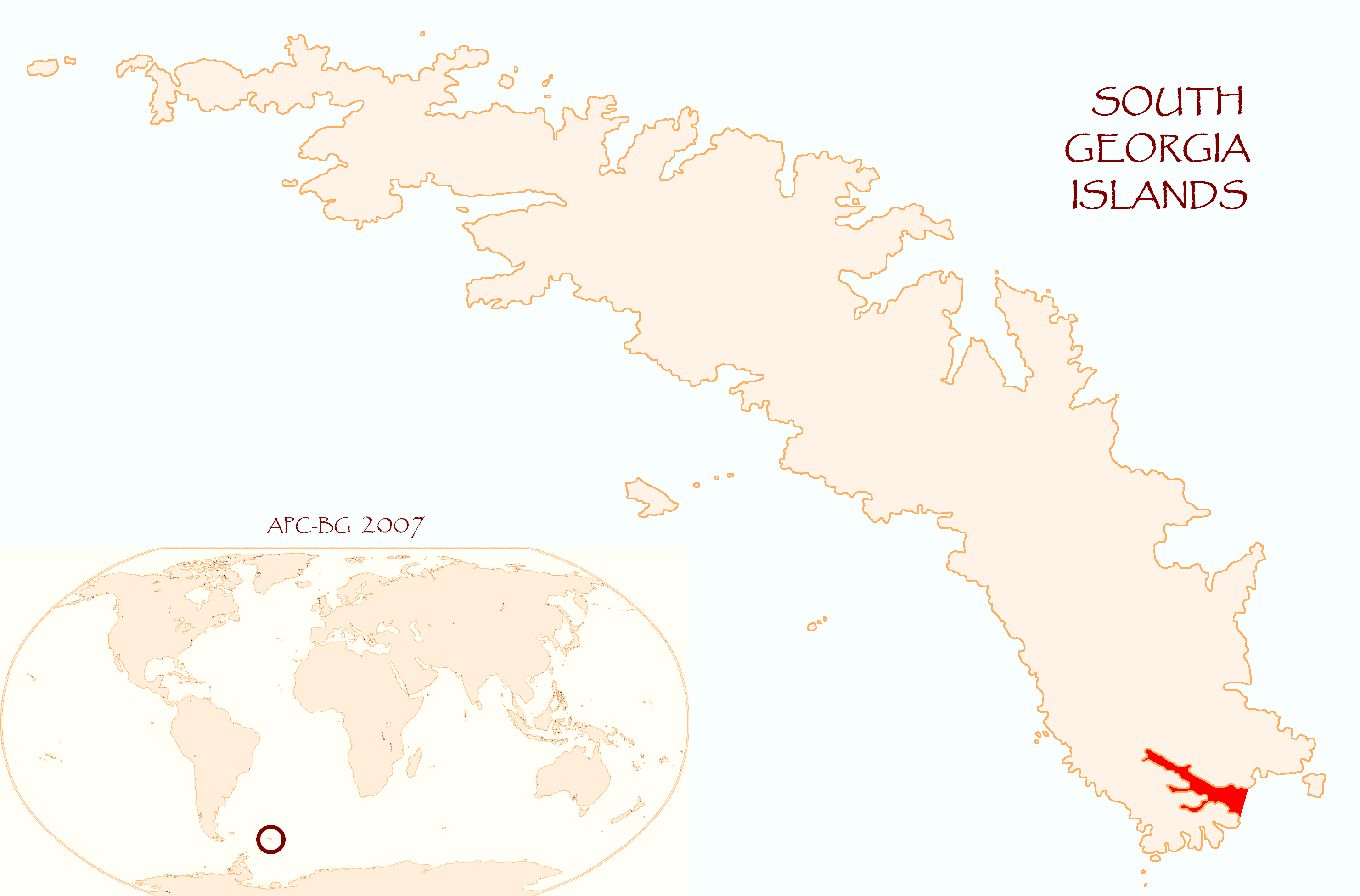
Southeast extremity of South Georgia with Drygalski Fjord

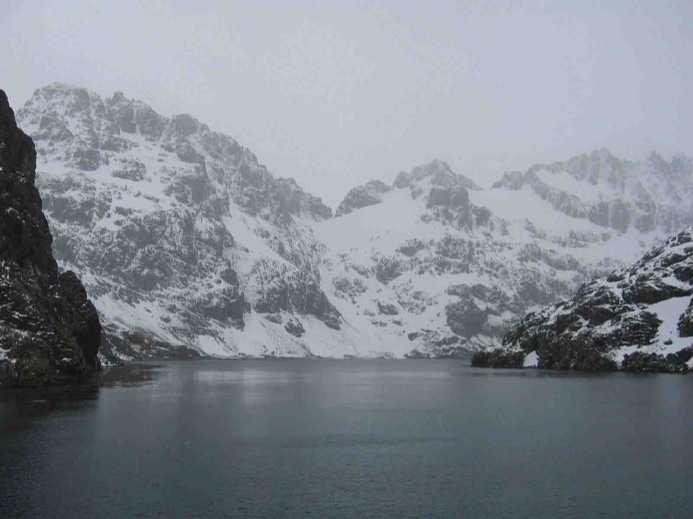
Drygalski Fjord (the entrance to Larsen Harbour)

Drygalski Fjord is a bay 1 mile (1.6 km) wide which recedes northwestwards 7 miles (11 km), entered immediately north of Nattriss Head along the southeast coast of South Georgia. It was charted by the Second German Antarctic Expedition, 1911–12, under Wilhelm Filchner, and named for Professor Erich von Drygalski, the leader of the First German Antarctica Expedition, 1901–03.

According to L. Harrison Matthews, Drygalski Fjord might have been the place where Anthony de la Roché spent two weeks during his stay in the island in April 1675.

== Named locations ==
Nattriss Head, a small but prominent rock headland, marks the south side of the entrance to Drygalski Fjord. Like the fjord, it was charted by Filchner's expedition. It was originally named Nattriss Point for E.A. Nattriss, shipping officer to the Discovery Committee, following survey by Discovery Investigations personnel in 1927. It was later renamed Nattriss Head to avoid confusion with Nattriss Point on Saunders Island in the South Sandwich Islands.

Brandt Cove is a cove on the south side of the fjord, 1 nautical mile (2 km) north of the head of Larsen Harbour. It was surveyed by the South Georgia Survey in the period 1951–57, and named by the UK Antarctic Place-Names Committee for American economist Karl Brandt. Mount Mair sits south of Brandt Cove, separating it from Larsen Harbour.

Trendall Crag is a mountain crag overlooking the north side of the fjord at the southeast end of South Georgia. Surveyed by the South Georgia Survey (SGS) from 1951 to 1957 by a research group led by English explorer Duncan Carse, it was named after Alec Trendall, an English geologist who took part in the SGS expedition. The crag has an elevation of 1,005 metres (1.005 km).
