= Salvesen Range =

Mountain range in South Georgia

Coordinates: 54°40′S 036°07′W

The Salvesen Mountains or Salvesen Range is a mountain range on the southern tip of South Georgia, rising to a maximum elevation of 2,330 metres (7,644 ft). They were created 127 million years ago and are made mainly from granite. The Cretaceous granite is embedded into the Jurassic basaltic lavas and dolerite dykes, both of which are black, so they create a striking colour contrast in exposures. Both the granite and the basalt were formed from rising magma formed on the divergent plate boundary where the southern Atlantic Ocean opened. The main ranges of South Georgia, famously crossed by Ernest Shackleton in 1916, are less rugged and precipitous than the Salvesen Mountains, as they are formed from folded sandstone. These were formed from sand deposition, the sediment for which was derived from erosion of the igneous rocks and rifting continental blocks.

The range was surveyed by the South Georgia Survey, 1951–52, and named for Sir Harold Salvesen, a director of Messrs. Chr. Salvesen and Co., Leith, who gave great assistance to the SGS, 1951–52 and 1953–54.

== Landmarks ==
Mountains in the range include:

- Mount Carse
- Mount Paterson
- Smoky Wall
