= Duncan Carse =

English explorer and actor (1913–2004)

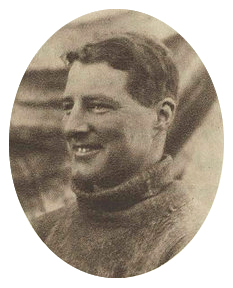

Verner Duncan Carse (28 July 1913 – 2 May 2004) was an English explorer and actor known for surveying South Georgia and for the portrayal of Special Agent Dick Barton on BBC Radio.

== Early life ==
Carse was born on 28 July 1913 in Fulham, London, the son of the artist A. Duncan Carse. He attended school at Sherborne School in Dorset, England and in Lausanne, Switzerland.

Carse married Bertha Sylvia Hadfield in 1938, with whom he had two daughters. He had a son with his second wife Elizabeth Wilen - Peter Carse. Carse married Venetia Kempe, his third wife, in December 1962. They lived in Fittleworth, West Sussex, and the marriage lasted until Carse's death on 2 May 2004, aged 90.

== Exploration ==
Carse joined the Merchant Navy and sailed for the Southern Ocean aboard the RRS Discovery II in 1933. While in Port Stanley, Falkland Islands, Carse encountered the British Graham Land Expedition, which was on its way to Antarctica on the yacht Penola. Carse secured permission to transfer to the expedition, serving as a seaman and wireless operator and helping to lay depots on the Antarctic Peninsula. Carse returned to England in 1937, and in 1939 he was awarded the silver Polar Medal and Clasp for his part in the Graham Land expedition.

After the Second World War, Carse was determined to resume exploration of the far south. At the suggestion of the Royal Geographical Society and the Scott Polar Institute, he decided to focus his attention on the subantarctic island of South Georgia. His efforts over the next several decades won him a preeminent place in South Georgia's history. He organised and led the South Georgia Survey of 1951–57, surveying much of the interior of the island. Mount Carse and Carse Point are named after him. The comprehensive survey of the island resulted in the classic 1:200000 topographic map of South Georgia, occasionally updated but never superseded since its first publication by the British Directorate of Overseas Surveys in 1958. A full account of the four South Georgia Survey expeditions led by Duncan Carse was written by the geologist on 1951–52 and 1953–54 Surveys, Alec Trendall.

In 1961, he decided to become a modern day Robinson Crusoe, and lived as a hermit in a remote part of South Georgia. Carse built a house at Ducloz Head on the southern coast of the island, intending to live there through the winter. However, in May, three months into the experiment, surge waves destroyed his camp. He managed to salvage enough gear to survive the winter until making contact with a ship 116 days later.

Carse maintained a long interest in the expeditions of Sir Ernest Henry Shackleton and wrote the Introduction and Notes to the 1974 Folio Society Edition of Shackleton's Boat Journey by Frank Worsley

A second Polar Medal clasp was awarded in 1982 for his leadership of the later Survey work – this mapping being of particular value in the period of conflict in the Falklands.

== Radio ==
After his return from the Antarctic, Carse began working in radio for the BBC. He was a presenter and announcer from 1939 to 1942, when he joined the Royal Navy for service in the Second World War. After the end of the war, he returned to radio, and in 1949 secured his best-known role: he was the voice of Special Agent Dick Barton for 265 of the 711 episodes of the very popular BBC Radio serial. He continued in this role until leaving for the South Georgia Survey in 1951. Carse worked as a presenter through the mid-1980s, and participated in producing BBC documentaries about South Georgia and the Antarctic.

== Film and television ==
Proud Canvas (BBC, 1947) Narrator: Duncan Carse
The Goshawk (David Cobham/BBC, 1968) Lead role (Falconer): Duncan Carse
Survival in Limbo (David Cobham/BBC, 1976)

The BFI Filmography record for Carse lists over 140 roles from Presenter/Commentator/Narrator to scriptwriting, music and acting through his near-50-year career. The listing suggests an alternative name J.York Scarlett or Yorke Scarlett was used for Sound Recording work.

Between 1981 and 1983 Carse presented three series of the programme Travellers in Time on BBC2. These presented archive films from the early 20th century, including those from Antarctic expeditions and early attempts to climb Mount Everest.

== Portraits of Carse ==
A number of expedition images of Carse from 1934 to 1937 are now in the Scott Polar Research Institute online archive, Freeze Frame.

The Falkland Islands Philatelic bureau issued postage stamps to commemorate Carse's life.

One photographic portrait exists in the National Portrait Gallery by Howard Coster.

Duncan Carse died shortly after finally agreeing to a portrait sitting but in discussion with his wife Venetia, it was agreed that it would be fitting to work on the sculpture with reference to visual memories, a photographic archive of 60 years of images and with her help. Bronze portrait busts of Carse by sculptor Jon Edgar are now held in public collections at South Georgia Museum, South Atlantic and the Scott Polar Research Institute, Cambridge University, UK. The terracotta original is held in the collection of the artist.
