= Jossac Bight =

Bight in South Georgia

Coordinates: 54°16′S 37°11′W

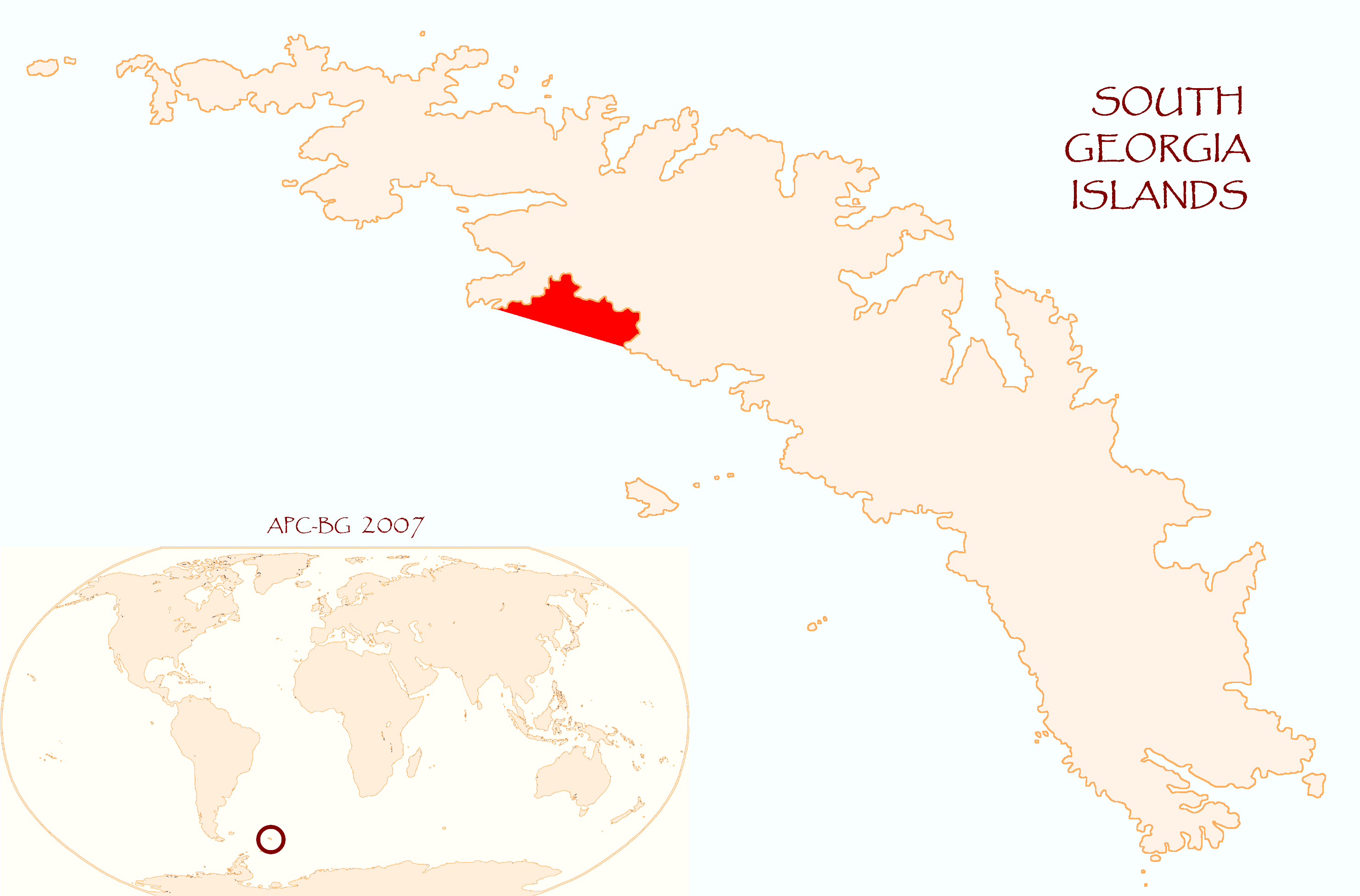
Location of Jossac Bight

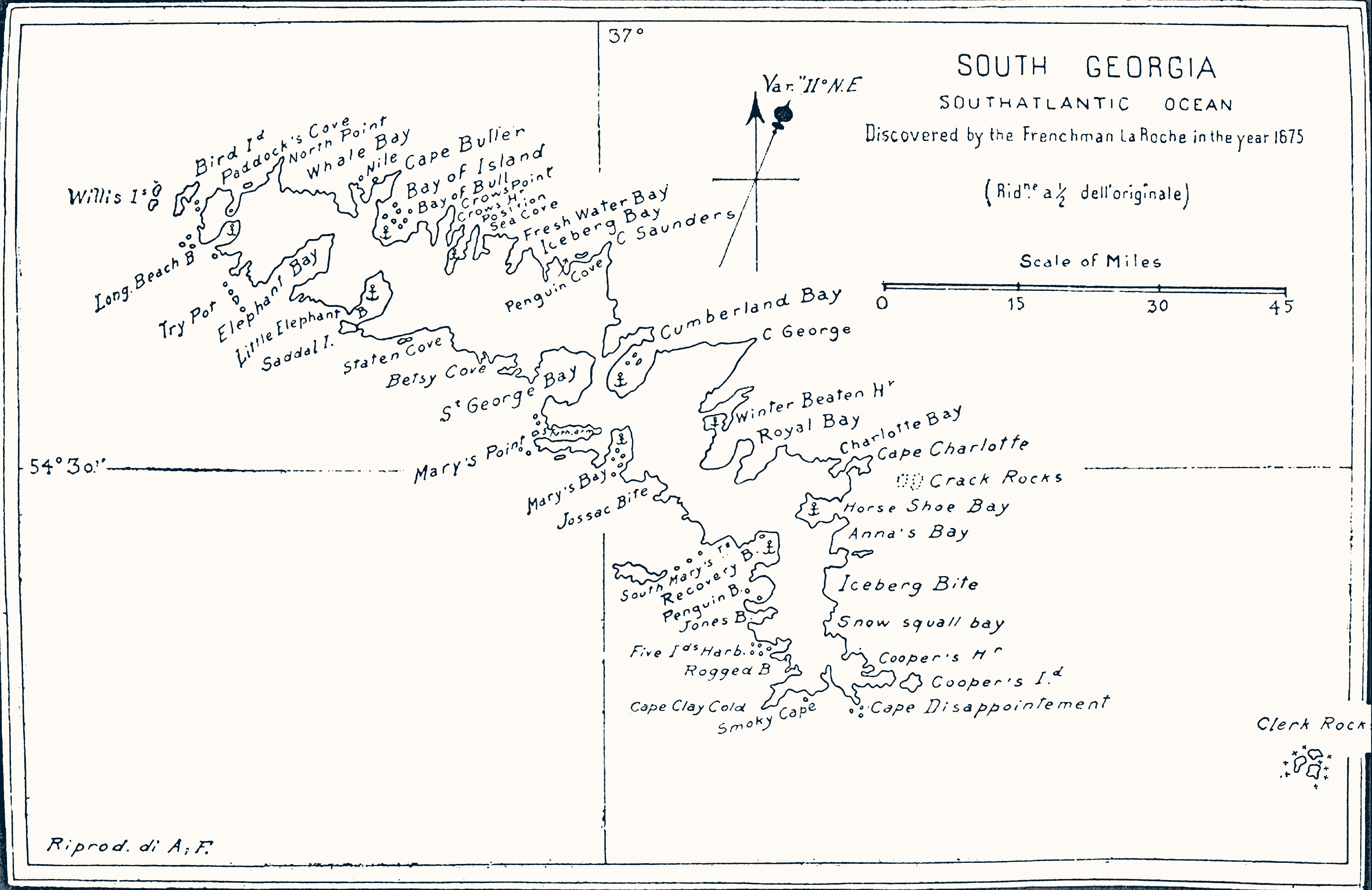
Pendleton's 1802 map showing "Jossac Bite" [sic]

Jossac Bight is a bight extending for 7 nautical miles (13 km) along the south coast of South Georgia between Holmestrand and Aspasia Point. The name "Jossac Bite" was used by the early sealers for a bight to the southeast of King Haakon Bay, and probably referred to this feature. The compound name "Holmestrand-Hortenbucht" (presumably derived from the two existing names Holmestrand and Horten) was later used by a German expedition under Ludwig Kohl-Larsen in 1928–29. A form of the earlier name has been approved.

Bore is a small cove indenting the mid part of the bight.
