= South Georgia Survey =

Series of research expeditions

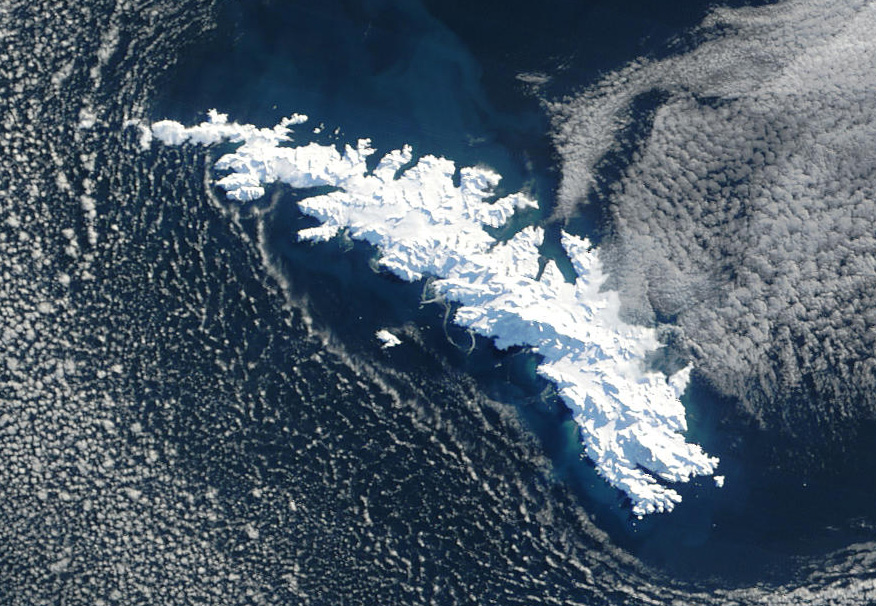
Satellite image of South Georgia Island

The South Georgia Survey was a series of expeditions to survey and map the island of South Georgia, led by Duncan Carse between 1951 and 1957. Although South Georgia had been commercially exploited as a whaling station during the first half of the 20th century, its interior was generally unknown, and maps were largely based on the original survey by James Cook, who first landed on the island in 1775. The South Georgia Survey was intended to make high-quality modern maps covering the entire island, and took place in four austral summer seasons: 1951–52, 1953–54, 1955–56, and 1956–57.

The survey was funded by the Royal Geographical Society, the Falkland Islands Dependencies, Odhams Press, and other private supporters. The War Office and Ministry of Supply provided 250 man-days of cold-weather rations, along with a loan of clothing and sledging equipment. Transportation to and from South Georgia was provided on the ships used to supply the whaling stations and ferry whale oil back to market. The survey members also often rode along on the whaling vessels to survey the coasts of the island and to be dropped off or picked up for inland work. The survey used the whaling settlement of Grytviken as its base of operations in South Georgia, with lodging provided in the Grytviken jail, which had space for 3–4 men and was generally unoccupied.

== 1951–52 season ==
The first expedition consisted of six men: Carse, deputy leader Kevin Walton, the surveyors Gordon Smillie and John Heaney, the geologist Alec Trendall, and the mountaineer Walter Roots. The expedition departed from Glasgow on the whaling tanker Southern Opal on September 16, 1951, and arrived in South Georgia on November 1. The goals for this campaign were to map the southwest coast of the island between Cape Disappointment and King Haakon Bay, and to survey the interior of the island to the south and west of the Allardyce Range (the side away from the whaling stations). The surveying was hampered in early January when the geologist Trendall fell into a crevasse and severely injured his left leg. The party spent a week transporting the injured man back to Grytviken, where he was cared for in the whaling station's hospital and sent home on the vessel Orwell. The remaining members of the expedition resumed the survey in late January and continued through late March, and by the end of the season, about 35–40% of the interior of the island had been mapped. The survey showed that South Georgia was somewhat thinner overall than indicated by previous maps, and this realization suggested that complete coverage could be attained with three seasons' work. The party left South Georgia on 18 April, again on the Southern Opal.

== 1953–54 season ==
The second campaign consisted of four men: the medical officer K. Warburton, in addition to Carse, Smillie, and Trendall from the earlier campaign. They left Glasgow aboard the Polar Maid on August 29, 1953 and arrived in Leith Harbour on October 10. From the beginning of the expedition Warburton was ill, with a probable duodenal ulcer. He was left behind in Grytviken, and sent home on the Orwell early in 1954. The three other members carried on the work of the survey, but were troubled by bad weather and the early departure of Smillie. Carse and Trendall left South Georgia aboard the Southern Opal on April 17.

Carse's South Georgia Survey did not make a campaign during the 1954–55 year. However, there was a British South Georgia Expedition led by George Sutton. This expedition was primarily aimed at mountaineering, although they did perform some surveying, and these results were incorporated into the South Georgia Survey's final maps.

== 1955–56 season ==
The third campaign was more ambitious and consisted of a larger group of eight men. Carse remained as leader, and Warburton was the doctor and deputy leader. The two surveyors were Tony Bomford and Stan Paterson. George Spenceley was the photographer, and there were three mountaineers: Tom Price, Louis Baume, and John Cunningham. Planning before the expedition focused on four areas that had not been adequately covered so far. A secondary goal was to determine the route used by Ernest Shackleton in his famous 1916 winter traverse during the Imperial Trans-Antarctic Expedition. The party arrived in Leith Harbour on September 24, 1955, on the Southern Opal. The surveying in this third season succeeded in filling the four major blank spaces in the map of the island, and identifying the uncertain segments of Shackleton's traverse. The party departed for home on the Southern Garden on April 3, 1956.

== 1956–57 season ==
Carse returned alone to complete the survey of a few remaining unmapped areas. He remained at South Georgia from September 25 through mid-November.
