= Camana =

Camaná is the district capital of Camaná Province in Arequipa, Peru.

Camana may also refer to:

== Peru ==
- Camaná province
- Camaná District
- Camaná River or Colca River
- Camana language, an unclassified language

== Other uses ==
- Cămana River, a river in Romania
- Camana Rock, in Stromness Bay, South Georgia

== See also ==
- Camañas, municipality in Teruel, Aragon, Spain
- Camanaú River, a river in Amazonas, Brazil
- Raquel Camaña, Argentine teacher
