= 2019 Pan American Games =

18th edition of the Pan American Games

XVIII Pan American Games
- Logo of the 2019 Pan American Games
- Host city: Lima
- Country: Peru
- Motto: Let's All Play; Spanish: Jugamos Todos; Quechua: Llapanchismi pukllanchis; Aymara: Taqinipuniw anatt'apxtanxa
- Nations: 41
- Athletes: 6,680
- Events: 419 in 38 sports
- Opening: July 26
- Closing: August 11
- Opened by: President Martín Vizcarra
- Cauldron lighter: Cecilia Tait
- Main venue: National Stadium of Peru
- Website: www.lima2019.pe/en

The 2019 Pan American Games (Spanish: Juegos Panamericanos de 2019), officially the XVIII Pan American Games (Spanish: XVIII Juegos Panamericanos) and commonly known as Lima 2019, were a multi-sport event governed by the Panam Sports Organization held in Lima, Peru from July 26 to August 11, 2019, with preliminary rounds in certain events having begun on July 24, 2019. These were the first Pan American Games to be held in Peru, and the seventh to be held in South America.

The opening ceremony took place on July 26 at the National Stadium of Peru, and the Games were declared open by former Peruvian President Martín Vizcarra. Events for this edition of Pan American Games were held at venues in and around Lima. This is the largest sporting event ever hosted by the country.

== Bidding process ==
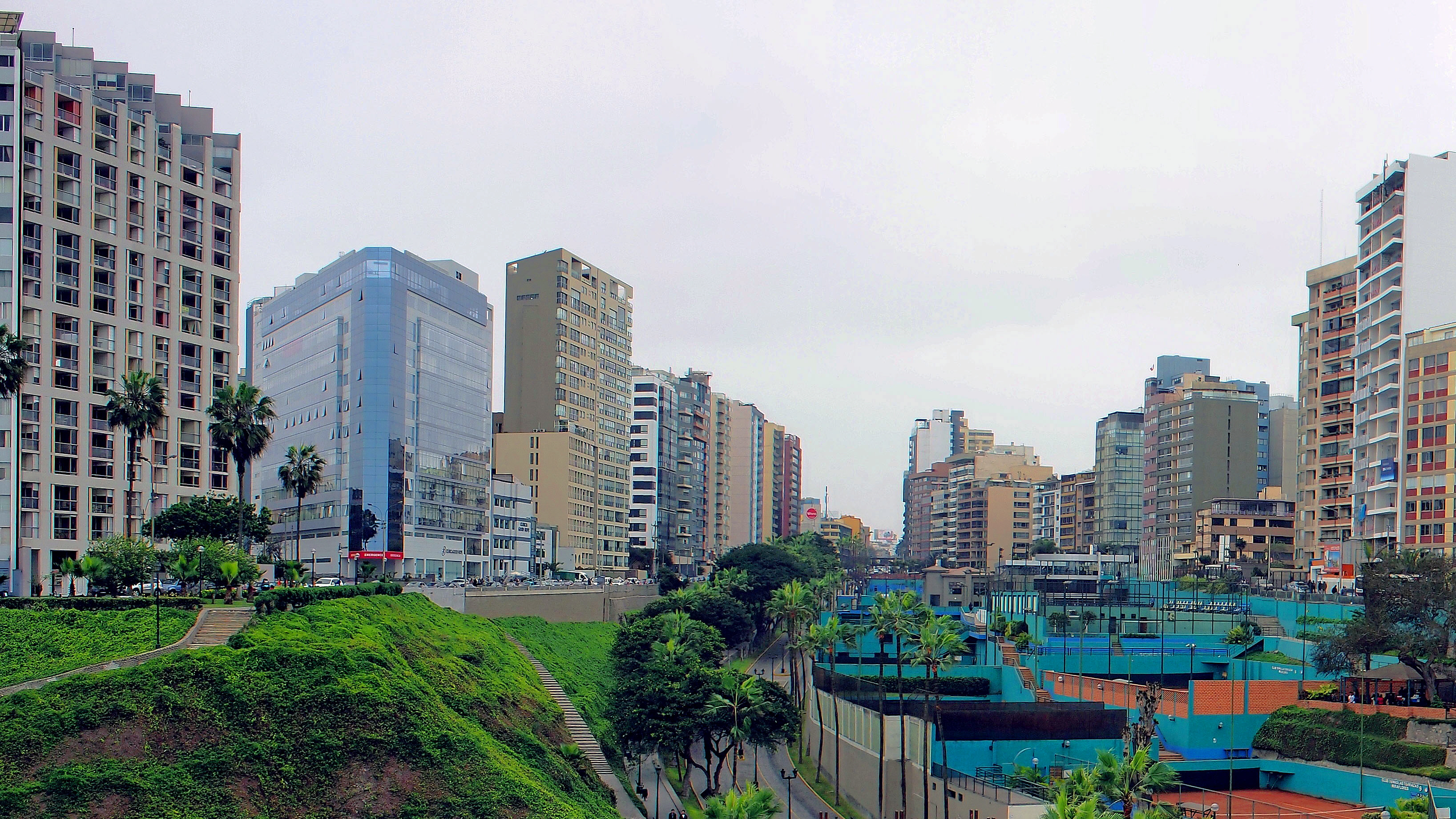
Lima was selected as the host city of the 2019 Pan American Games

A total of four bids were submitted for the 2019 Pan American Games, and they were officially announced on February 1, 2013. These were Lima in Peru, Santiago in Chile, Ciudad Bolívar in Venezuela and La Punta in Argentina. Lima submitted its bid for the games for the second consecutive time after losing to Toronto for the 2015 edition of the games. Santiago had won the rights to stage the 1975 and 1987 Pan American Games but withdrew both times before hosting. The other two cities bid for the games for the first time. Lima was elected as the host city on October 11, 2013, where PASO members gathered in Toronto, Ontario, Canada to elect the host city. The city had been considered the favourite to win the rights to host throughout the contest.

2019 Pan American Games bidding results
City	NOC	Round 1
Lima	Peru	31
La Punta	Argentina	9
Santiago	Chile	9
Ciudad Bolívar	Venezuela	8

== Development and preparation ==
=== Venues ===
The events were held in various Lima districts and neighboring cities, with most of them concentrated in the clusters of VIDENA (a complex in the San Luis District), Pan American Park (Villa María del Triunfo), the Sports Village of Callao, and a sports complex in Costa Verde.

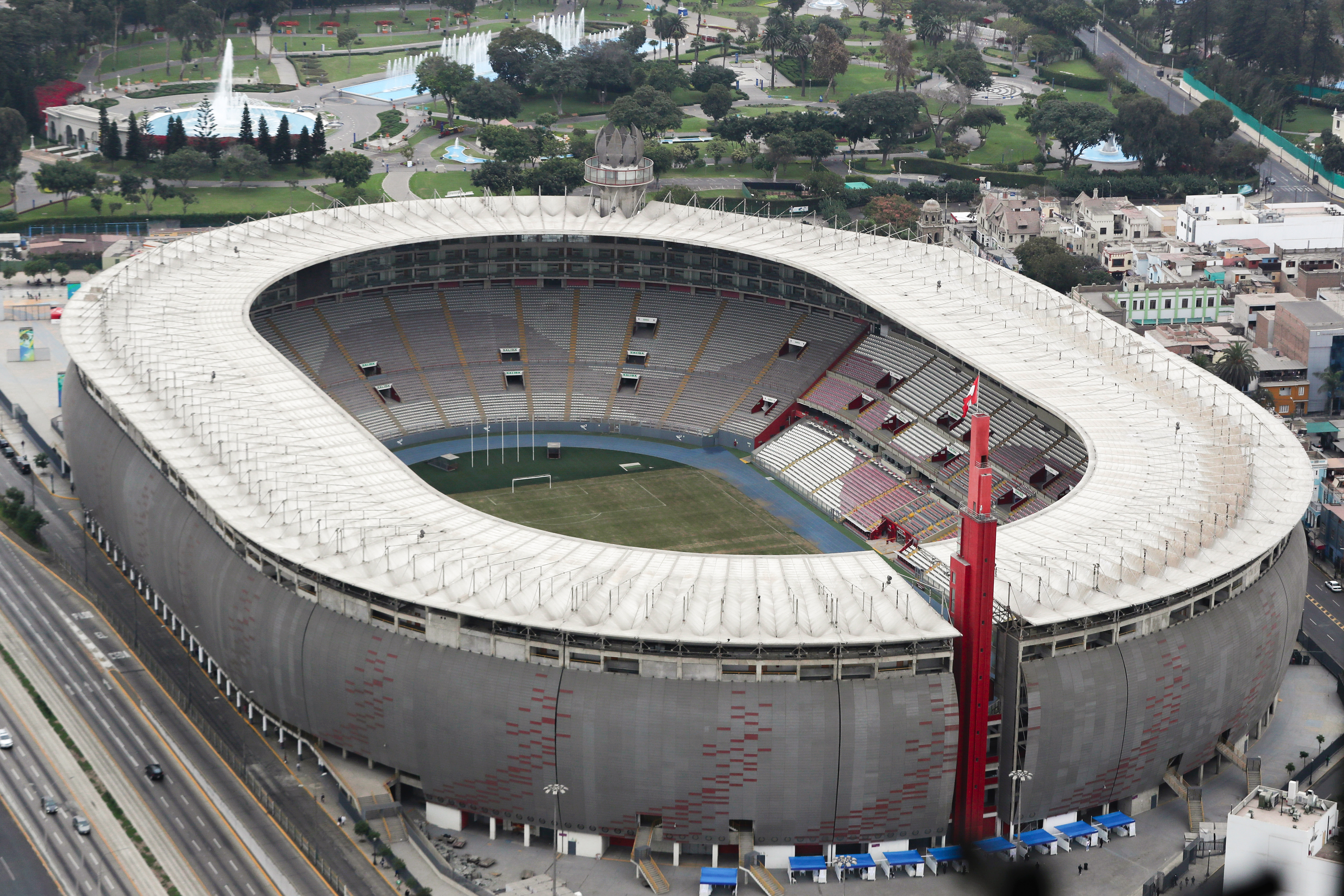
The Estadio Nacional hosted the opening and closing ceremonies

=== Financing ===
The total budget was estimated at US$1.2 billion, including $470 million spent on sports infrastructure, $180 million building the Pan American Village, $430 million spent in organization, and $106 million for other expenses.

=== Athletes' Village ===
9,500 athletes and team officials were accommodated in a complex with 1,700 units in Villa El Salvador.

=== Torch relay ===
The torch was sent from Mexico to Lima by sailboat, and the torch relay started in Machu Picchu. The torch had toured through 23 cities over 23 days and covered 5,500 kilometers en route to the Peru National Stadium in Lima, where it arrived on July 26, 2019, for the opening ceremony. The cities include Machu Picchu, Ollantaytambo, Cusco, Puno, Lake Titicaca, Arequipa, Camaná, Nazca, Ica, Ayacucho, Huancavelica, Cerro de Pasco, Huánuco, Tocache, Tarapoto, Bagua Grande, Piura, Cajamarca, Trujillo and Huaraz.

== The Games ==
=== Ceremonies ===
The opening ceremony of the games took place on July 26, 2019, and the closing ceremony took place on August 11, 2019.

=== Participating National Olympic Committees ===
All 41 nations who are members of the Pan American Sports Organization competed at the event. The numbers in parentheses represent the number of competitors that qualified from a country.

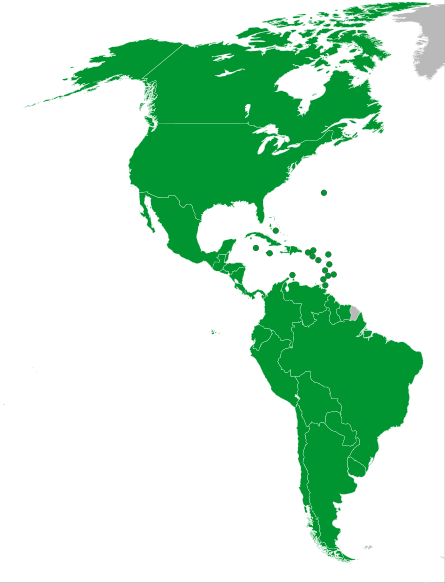
Participating countries

Participating National Olympic Committees
- Antigua and Barbuda (9)
- Argentina (529)
- Aruba (21)
- Bahamas (33)
- Barbados (31)
- Belize (6)
- Bermuda (17)
- Bolivia (49)
- Brazil (487)
- British Virgin Islands (5)
- Canada (477)
- Cayman Islands (6)
- Chile (317)
- Colombia (349)
- Costa Rica (84)
- Cuba (420)
- Dominica (2)
- Dominican Republic (209)
- Ecuador (201)
- El Salvador (59)
- Grenada (11)
- Guatemala (147)
- Guyana (26)
- Haiti (7)
- Honduras (44)
- Jamaica (124)
- Mexico (543)
- Nicaragua (61)
- Panama (84)
- Paraguay (71)
- Peru (592) (host)
- Puerto Rico (244)
- Saint Lucia (7)
- Saint Kitts and Nevis (4)
- Saint Vincent and the Grenadines (4)
- Suriname (6)
- Trinidad and Tobago (98)
- United States (643)
- Uruguay (147)
- Venezuela (282)
- Virgin Islands (29)

==== Number of athletes by National Olympic Committee ====
IOC	Country	Athletes
USA	United States	643
PER	Peru	592
MEX	Mexico	543
ARG	Argentina	529
BRA	Brazil	487
CAN	Canada	477
CUB	Cuba	420
COL	Colombia	349
CHI	Chile	317
VEN	Venezuela	282
PUR	Puerto Rico	244
DOM	Dominican Republic	209
ECU	Ecuador	201
GUA	Guatemala	147
URU	Uruguay	145
JAM	Jamaica	124
TRI	Trinidad and Tobago	98
CRC	Costa Rica	84
PAN	Panama	83
PAR	Paraguay	71
NCA	Nicaragua	61
ESA	El Salvador	56
BOL	Bolivia	49
HON	Honduras	44
BAH	Bahamas	33
BAR	Barbados	31
ISV	Virgin Islands	30
GUY	Guyana	26
ARU	Aruba	21
BER	Bermuda	17
GRN	Grenada	11
ANT	Antigua and Barbuda	9
HAI	Haiti	8
LCA	Saint Lucia	7
BIZ	Belize	6
CAY	Cayman Islands	6
SUR	Suriname	6
IVB	British Virgin Islands	5
SKN	Saint Kitts and Nevis	4
VIN	Saint Vincent and the Grenadines	4
DMA	Dominica	2

=== Sports ===
419 events in 38 sports were contested in Lima, the largest number of medal events ever held at a single edition of the Pan American Games until that date. Bodybuilding and surfing were contested at the Pan-Am Games for the first time in 2019, basque pelota was reinstated after being absent from the 2015 Games, and women's baseball was dropped after debuting in 2015.

Almost all of the new events being contested at the 2020 Summer Olympics were already on the Pan-Am Games' program. Sport climbing was excluded because it did not have the required number of national federations in the Americas to be eligible for inclusion. Skateboarding was pulled from the program in May 2019; Panam Sports cited that World Skate had diminished the quality of the event by having not made the Games be a qualifier for the Olympics, and its partner Street League Skateboarding (SLS) having scheduled a World Tour event in Los Angeles that conflicted with the Games.

The new disciplines that were scheduled to be introduced for the 2020 Summer Olympics were also added, including the 4 × 100m mixed medley relay, men's 800m and women's 1,500m in swimming, 3-on-3 basketball, BMX freestyle park, two new women's boxing events, Madison track cycling, the transfer of three men's events to mixed team events in shooting, table tennis mixed doubles, archery mixed team, and triathlon mixed relay. There was a reduction of one men's weightlifting event, and all canoe events being gender-neutral (removing a men's event from each discipline). 19 extra events were also added, including the 1m springboard in diving, as well three events in compound archery, modern pentathlon relays (with mixed, men's, and women's events), 49er, Nacra 17 and kiteboarding (the latter two replacing the Hobie 16 and J/24) events in sailing, extreme canoe slalom, mixed doubles squash, women's wakeboard, poomsae events in taekwondo, women's 50 km race walking, and men's and woman's doubles events in table tennis.

Numbers in parentheses indicate the number of medal events to be contested in each sport/discipline.

- Aquatics
  - Artistic swimming (2)
  - Diving (10)
  - Open water swimming (2)
  - Swimming (36)
  - Water polo (2)
- Archery (8)
- Athletics (48)
- Badminton (5)
- Baseball
  - Baseball (1)
  - Softball (2)
- Basketball (4)
- Basque pelota (10)
- Bodybuilding (2)
- Bowling (4)
- Boxing (15)
- Canoeing
  - Canoe sprint (12)
  - Canoe slalom (6)
- Cycling
  - BMX (4)
  - Mountain biking (2)
  - Road (4)
  - Track (12)
- Equestrian
  - Dressage (2)
  - Eventing (2)
  - Jumping (2)
- Fencing (12)
- Field hockey (2)
- Football (2)
- Golf (3)
- Gymnastics
  - Artistic gymnastics (14)
  - Rhythmic gymnastics (8)
  - Trampoline (2)
- Handball (2)
- Judo (14)
- Karate (14)
- Modern pentathlon (5)
- Racquetball (6)
- Roller sports
  - Figure Skating (2)
  - Speed Skating (6)
- Rowing (14)
- Rugby sevens (2)
- Sailing (11)
- Shooting (15)
- Squash (7)
- Surfing (8)
- Table tennis (7)
- Taekwondo (12)
- Tennis (5)
- Triathlon (3)
- Volleyball
  - Beach volleyball (2)
  - Volleyball (2)
- Water skiing (10)
- Weightlifting (14)
- Wrestling
  - Freestyle (12)
  - Greco-Roman (6)

=== Calendar ===
The calendar was unveiled on April 18, 2019, 100 days ahead to the start of the competition.

OC	Opening ceremony	●	Event competitions	1	Event finals	CC	Closing ceremony

July/August		24 Wed	25 Thu	26 Fri	27 Sat	28 Sun	29 Mon	30 Tue	31 Wed	1 Thu	2 Fri	3 Sat	4 Sun	5 Mon	6 Tue	7 Wed	8 Thu	9 Fri	10 Sat	11 Sun	Events
Ceremonies (opening / closing)				OC																CC	—N/a
Aquatics	Artistic swimming						●		2												2
Aquatics	Diving									2	2	2	2	2							10
Aquatics	Open water swimming												2								2
Aquatics	Swimming														8	7	9	6	6		36
Aquatics	Water polo												●	●	●		●	●	2		2
Archery																●	●	●	3	5	8
Athletics					2								2		5	6	10	11	10	2	48
Badminton							●	●	●	●	5										5
Baseball							●	●	●	●	●	●	1								1
Basketball					●	●	2		●	●	●	●	1		●	●	●	●	1		4
Basque pelota													●	●	●	●	●	●	10		10
Bodybuilding																			2		2
Boxing					●	●	●	●		7	8										15
Bowling			●		2	●	●	2													4
Canoeing	Slalom										●	●	6								6
Canoeing	Sprint				1	2	5	4													12
Cycling	BMX																●	2		2	4
Cycling	Mountain biking					2															2
Cycling	Road															2			2		4
Cycling	Track									3	2	3	4								12
Equestrian	Dressage					●	1		1												2
Equestrian	Eventing										●	●	2								2
Equestrian	Jumping														●	1		1			2
Fencing														2	2	2	2	2	2		12
Field hockey							●	●	●	●	●	●	●	●		●	●	1	1		2
Football						●	●		●	●		●	●		●	●		1	1		2
Golf																	●	●	●	3	3
Gymnastics	Artistic				1	1	2	5	5												14
Gymnastics	Rhythmic										●	2	3	3							8
Gymnastics	Trampoline												●	2							2
Handball		●	●		●		●	1	●	●	●		●	1							2
Judo																	3	3	4	4	14
Karate																		4	5	5	14
Modern pentathlon				●	1	1	2	1													5
Racquetball											●	●	●	●	●	4	●	●	2		6
Roller sports	Figure			●	2																2
Roller sports	Speed																	2	4		6
Rowing															●	●	4	5	5		14
Rugby sevens				●	●	2															2
Sailing												●	●	●	●	●	●	6	5		11
Shooting					1	2	2	2	1	2	2	3									15
Softball			●		●	●	●	●	●	1			●	●	●	●	●	●	1		2
Squash			●	●	2	3	●	●	2												7
Surfing							●	●	●	●	2	●	6								8
Table tennis													●	1	2	2	●	●	2		7
Taekwondo					4	4	4														12
Tennis							●	●	●	●	●	3	2								5
Triathlon					2		1														3
Volleyball	Beach	●	●	●	●	●	●	2													2
Volleyball	Indoor								●	●	●	●	1			●	●	●	●	1	2
Water skiing					●	●	7	3													10
Weightlifting					3	4	4	3													14
Wrestling																5	4	5	4		18
Total events					21	21	30	23	11	15	21	13	32	11	17	29	32	49	72	22	419
Cumulative total					21	42	72	95	106	121	142	155	187	198	215	244	276	325	397	419	—N/a
		24 Wed	25 Thu	26 Fri	27 Sat	28 Sun	29 Mon	30 Tue	31 Wed	1 Thu	2 Fri	3 Sat	4 Sun	5 Mon	6 Tue	7 Wed	8 Thu	9 Fri	10 Sat	11 Sun	Events

== Medal table ==
Key

* Host nation (Peru)

Rank	Nation	Gold	Silver	Bronze	Total
1	United States	122	87	84	293
2	Brazil	54	45	70	169
3	Mexico	37	39	62	138
4	Canada	35	65	52	152
5	Argentina	33	33	34	100
6	Cuba	33	28	39	100
7	Colombia	27	24	31	82
8	Chile	13	19	18	50
9	Dominican Republic	11	12	17	40
10	Peru*	11	7	23	41
11–31	Remaining NOCs	43	60	92	195
Totals (31 entries)		419	419	522	1,360

Medals used in the games

Bronze medal	Silver medal	Gold medal

== Media ==
=== Broadcasting ===
Mediapro served as host broadcaster. The Lima Convention Centre hosted the International Broadcast Centre (IBC). Panam Sports also launched the Panam Sports Channel on its website, which featured supplemental video content from the Games hosted by local personality Alexandra Hörler.

== Marketing ==
Milco, the mascot of the 2019 Pan American Games

=== Logo ===
The official logo of the 2019 Pan American Games is inspired by the amancay, an indigenous flower that flourishes from June 24 through September 30. The flower and its pistils represent three athletes with open arms and the three Americas, with the identity of Lima. It was designed by Peruvian graphic designers Juan Diego Sanz and Jorge Luis Zárate.

=== Mascot ===
In June 2017, after over a thousand submissions, the organising committee revealed the final three in the running to be the mascot of the games. The final three designs were: Milco, which was influenced by Cuchimilco sculptures (pre-Hispanic figures of Chancay culture developed in Lima around 1200–1470 A.D.); a flower named Amantis; and Wayqi, a leaf-toed gecko. In July 2017, it was announced Milco was the winner of the contest, receiving 45% of the vote. There was approximately 44,154 votes cast in the contest, the most ever for a mascot competition for the Pan American Games. The winning designer of the competition was awarded 15,000 Peruvian soles (or approximately US$4,600). Milco's body is orange and the colour of his shorts is red, while his T-shirt is white, representing the colors of the Peruvian flag. Milco was designed by 24-year-old Andrea Norka Medrano Moy.

=== Music ===
The theme of the 2019 Pan American Games, titled "Jugamos Todos" (English: "We all play") was composed by Pedro Suárez-Vértiz.

== See also ==
- 2019 Parapan American Games
- 2027 Pan American Games - also scheduled for Lima

Preceded by Toronto	XVIII Pan American Games; Lima (2019)	Succeeded by Santiago
