= Nicolás de Piérola District =

Coordinates: 16.5712°S 72.7151°W

Nicolás de Piérola
- District
- Interactive map of Nicolás de Piérola
- Country: Peru
- Region: Arequipa
- Province: Camaná
- Founded: November 3, 1944
- Capital: San Gregorio

Government
  - Mayor: Limber Fredy Ortiz García (2019-2022)

Area
  - Total: 391.84 km^{2} (151.29 sq mi)
- Elevation: 15 m (49 ft)

Population (2017)
  - Total: 7,106
  - Density: 18.13/km^{2} (46.97/sq mi)
- Time zone: UTC-5 (PET)
- UBIGEO: 040205

Nicolás de Piérola District is one of eight districts of the province Camaná.

== See also ==
- Wamp'uy
