= José María Quimper District =

Coordinates: 16°36′11″S 72°43′34″W

José María Quimper
- District
- Interactive map of José María Quimper
- Country: Peru
- Region: Arequipa
- Province: Camaná
- Founded: November 3, 1944
- Capital: El Cardo

Government
  - Mayor: Julio Cesar Montoya

Area
  - Total: 16.72 km^{2} (6.46 sq mi)
- Elevation: 22 m (72 ft)

Population (2017)
  - Total: 4,641
  - Density: 277.6/km^{2} (718.9/sq mi)
- Time zone: UTC-5 (PET)
- UBIGEO: 040202

José María Quimper District is one of eight districts of the province Camaná in Peru.
