= Mariscal Cáceres District, Camaná =

Coordinates: 16.6188°S 72.7350°W

Mariscal Cáceres
- District
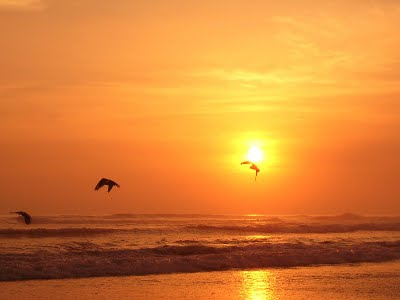
- Turismo camana
- Interactive map of Mariscal Cáceres
- Country: Peru
- Region: Arequipa
- Province: Camaná
- Founded: November 3, 1944
- Capital: San José

Government
  - Mayor: Jaime Isaías Mamani Álvarez (2019-2022)

Area
  - Total: 579.31 km^{2} (223.67 sq mi)
- Elevation: 11 m (36 ft)

Population (2017)
  - Total: 6,195
  - Density: 10.69/km^{2} (27.70/sq mi)
- Time zone: UTC-5 (PET)
- UBIGEO: 040204

Mariscal Cáceres District (Spanish mariscal marshal) is one of eight districts of the province Camaná in Peru.

The district was named after the Peruvian president Andrés Avelino Cáceres.
