= Samuel Pastor District =

Coordinates: 16.6296°S 72.6816°W

Samuel Pastor
- District
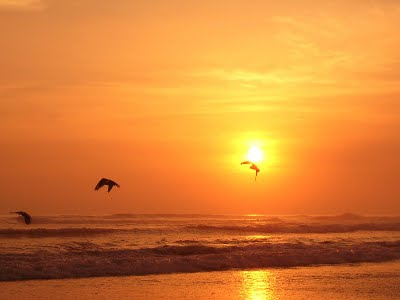
- Turismo camana
- Interactive map of Samuel Pastor
- Country: Peru
- Region: Arequipa
- Province: Camaná
- Founded: November 3, 1944
- Capital: La Pampa

Government
  - Mayor: Wilber Sergio Jahuira Apaza (2019-2022)

Area
  - Total: 113.4 km^{2} (43.8 sq mi)
- Elevation: 26 m (85 ft)

Population (2017)
  - Total: 15,950
  - Density: 140.7/km^{2} (364.3/sq mi)
- Time zone: UTC-5 (PET)
- UBIGEO: 040208

Samuel Pastor District is one of eight districts of Camaná Province in Peru.
