= La Pampa, Peru =

Coordinates: 16.6296°S 72.6816°W

La Pampa
- Location within Peru
- Country: Peru
- Region: Arequipa
- Province: Camaná
- District: Samuel Pastor

Government
  - Mayor: Wilber Sergio Jahuira Apaza (2019-2022)
- Elevation: 22 m (72 ft)

La Pampa is the capital of Samuel Pastor District in Camaná Province in Peru. As of 2019, the town had a population of around 25,000. During this period, the town faced massive amounts of illegal mining operations for gold.
