= Mariano Nicolás Valcárcel District =

Coordinates: 16.0247°S 73.4510°W

Mariano Nicolás Valcárcel Uraski
- District
- Interactive map of Mariano Nicolás Valcárcel
- Country: Peru
- Region: Arequipa
- Province: Camaná
- Founded: November 3, 1944
- Capital: Urasqui

Government
  - Mayor: Helarf Portocarrero Carnero

Area
  - Total: 557.74 km^{2} (215.34 sq mi)
- Elevation: 338 m (1,109 ft)

Population (2017)
  - Total: 6,997
  - Density: 12.55/km^{2} (32.49/sq mi)
- Time zone: UTC-5 (PET)
- UBIGEO: 040203

Mariano Nicolás Valcárcel District is one of eight districts of the province Camaná in Peru.
