= Huamboy =

Archaeological site in Peru

- Interactive map of Huamboy
- Location: Peru; Arequipa Region, Camaná Province

Huamboy (possibly from Quechua wamp'uy, meaning "to navigate, to sail, to travel by boat") is an archaeological site featuring cemeteries and a village located on a hill of the same name in Peru. It is situated in the Arequipa Region, Camaná Province, Nicolás de Piérola District. The complex was declared a National Cultural Heritage site by Resolución Directoral Nacional No. 1106/INC on August 4, 2009.
