= Cuchimilco =

Chancay culture terracotta figurines

The cuchimilco figures are unglazed terracotta figurines, created between 1200 and 1450 AD by the Chancay culture, which developed in the latter part of the Inca Empire. Ceramic guardian figures were important in Chancay culture. They normally come in pairs of male and female figures, with stocky, almost triangular shaped bodies and upraised arms. The figures are similar but have different painted decoration to indicate gender differences in dress. The exact function of these figures is unknown, but it is thought that they may have acted as guardians to the tombs of the Chancay people, or as companions in the afterlife.

== Description of form ==
The cuchimilco sculptures model after humans with stocky bodies, a flat head, long raised arms and short legs. These figures are made with two-part molds of unglazed white-slipped terracotta with black lines of ornamentation. The details are stamped on using black paint or ink. Most figures lack proper clothing besides bracelets, headdresses or hats, and masks around their eyes. The faces on these figures are very small with the features close together. Also, there is a surprised expression on most of the figures, which is shown by wide eyes and oftentimes a gaped open mouth. When clothing is present, such as a poncho, the black lines create geometric patterns that often display various types of animals important to the culture. It is common for these figures to have a wide flattened, triangular-shaped hat or head with a mask around the eyes, which are traditional of the Chancay culture. The heads or hats, as well as the patterns of the clothing on two genders of the figures, are different, which could show the different roles or importance of each gender.

The cuchimilco figure are often created or found in pairs, male and female, which indicates the importance of divine duality. Also, the figures are frontal facing and symmetrical with both arms extended out or up, which indicate a welcoming posture. Archeologists commonly find cuchimilco in burial sites of graves of the deceased, specifically those of nobility, which has led to the belief that the importance of meaning behind these figures is that they ward off bad spirits or energies. The cuchimilcos have acquired the nickname of guardian figures because the welcoming posture with outstretched arms keep bad energies away from the body or spirit that is buried with. It is also believed by archeologists that the figures represent family members of the departed to help aid in absorbing the evil energy around them.

The cuchimilco figures are often compared or confused with the funerary dolls of the Chancay culture. While both are connected to the burial sites or tombs, they provide two different purposes for the Chancay. The burial doll created from woven fabric may have the purpose of a child's play toy that was then buried with the departed, which in turn may act as a companion in the afterlife.

However, the two items do not have exact functions, meaning the particular purpose behind these objects are unknown; historians and archeologists are just creating ideas to assume their meanings. The hypotheses that have been formed about the purposes of the cuchimilco and the funerary doll comes from where is items are located at when found. Also, each gender of the two figures have geometric patterns that differ from the other. The two items are often found with dramatic facial features, such as wide eyed in a surprised fashion, which could have a meaning in the funerary realm.

== Iconography ==
The Chancay culture lived primarily in the valleys of what today is Peru. Establishing themselves in 1200 AD, they flourished until 1450 AD when they fell to the Inca Empire. Little is known about this culture because they kept no written record; however, they had assortment of ceramics, textiles and woodworks that left a glimpse into their culture. The ceramic works are the most common artifacts left behind. The most common ceramic pieces were vessels that modeled human faces or animals and the cuchimilco.

The funerary process was very important to the Chancay culture. Large cemeteries and tombs were created to house the dead members of the community. The hierarchy are the community was shown by the different tomb sizes. The political leaders or high ranked people were in large, deep tombs that were ten feet in depth or more were entered by a ladders. The ceramic artifacts, along with woodworks, precious metals and textiles have mainly been found the tombs of the deceased, which may be a symbol of offerings for the dead in the afterlife. Some archeologists suspect that the Chancay culture believe in life after death because of the various objects that are left in the tombs of the deceased. However, because there are no written records or other ways to get information about this culture besides the ceramics, woodworks and textiles, the true meaning behind the reason for this is unknown and only hypotheses can be made.

== Historiography ==
These figurines are ethnographic and can be found in museums, as well as personal collections. They are found around the world from Arizona to Chile to the UK back to Peru. Many people find these objects enticing because of their purpose of warding off evil energies or spirits. However, most of the cuchimilco that are for sale or auctioned are replicates of originals created by expert artists. The figures made by the actual Chancay culture are far more valuable than the replicates. Certain replicates are sold from less than a hundred dollars and up, while the real artifacts are sold for over two thousand dollars depending on the condition and details on the figure. Some figures sell for over three thousand dollars, but this is probably for original pieces. With little information on the Chancay culture due to a lack of written records, the cuchimilco helps gain some insight on this cryptic culture.
