= Camaná province =

Camaná
- Province
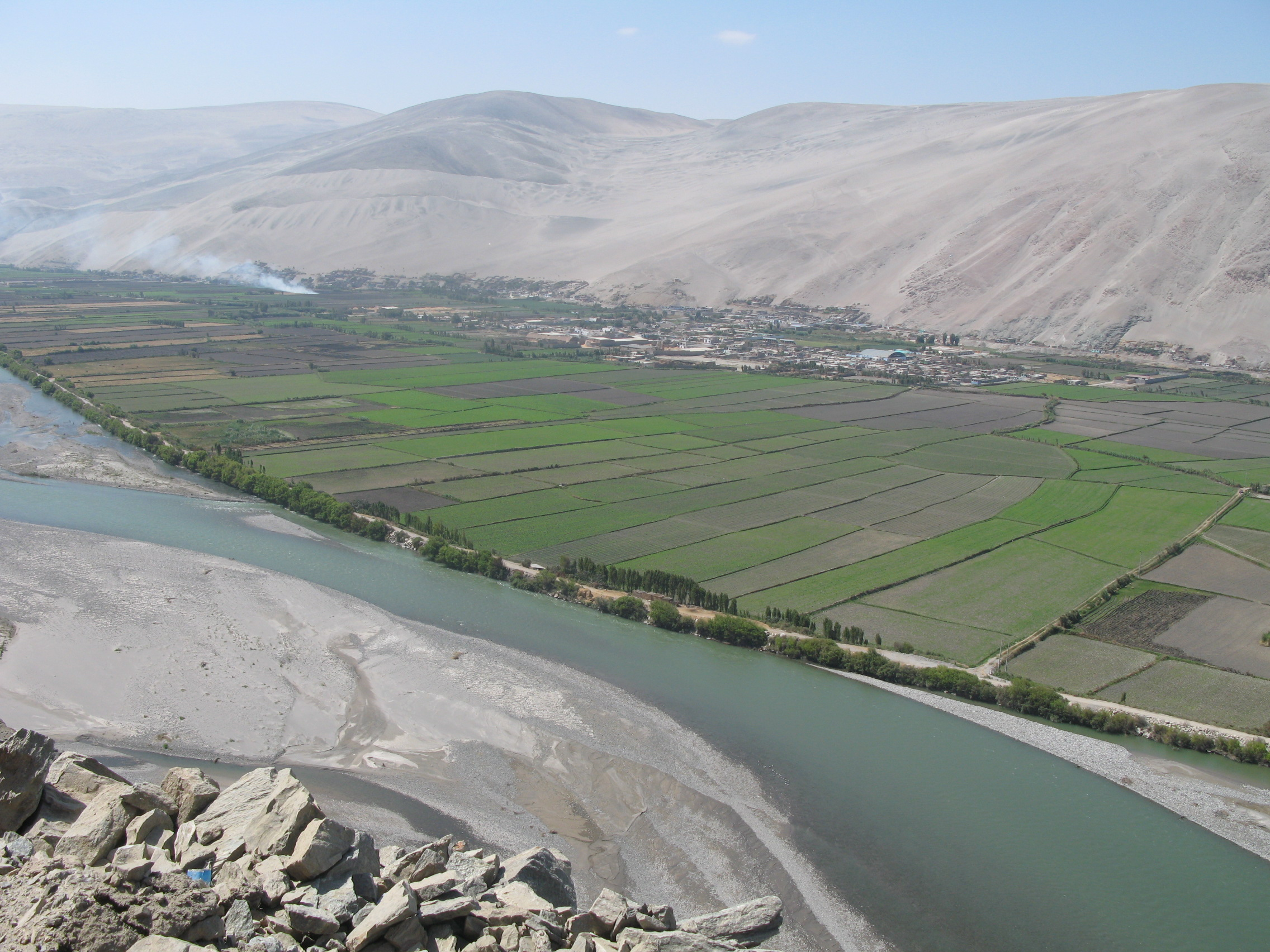
- The Ocoña River with the town Ocoña in the background

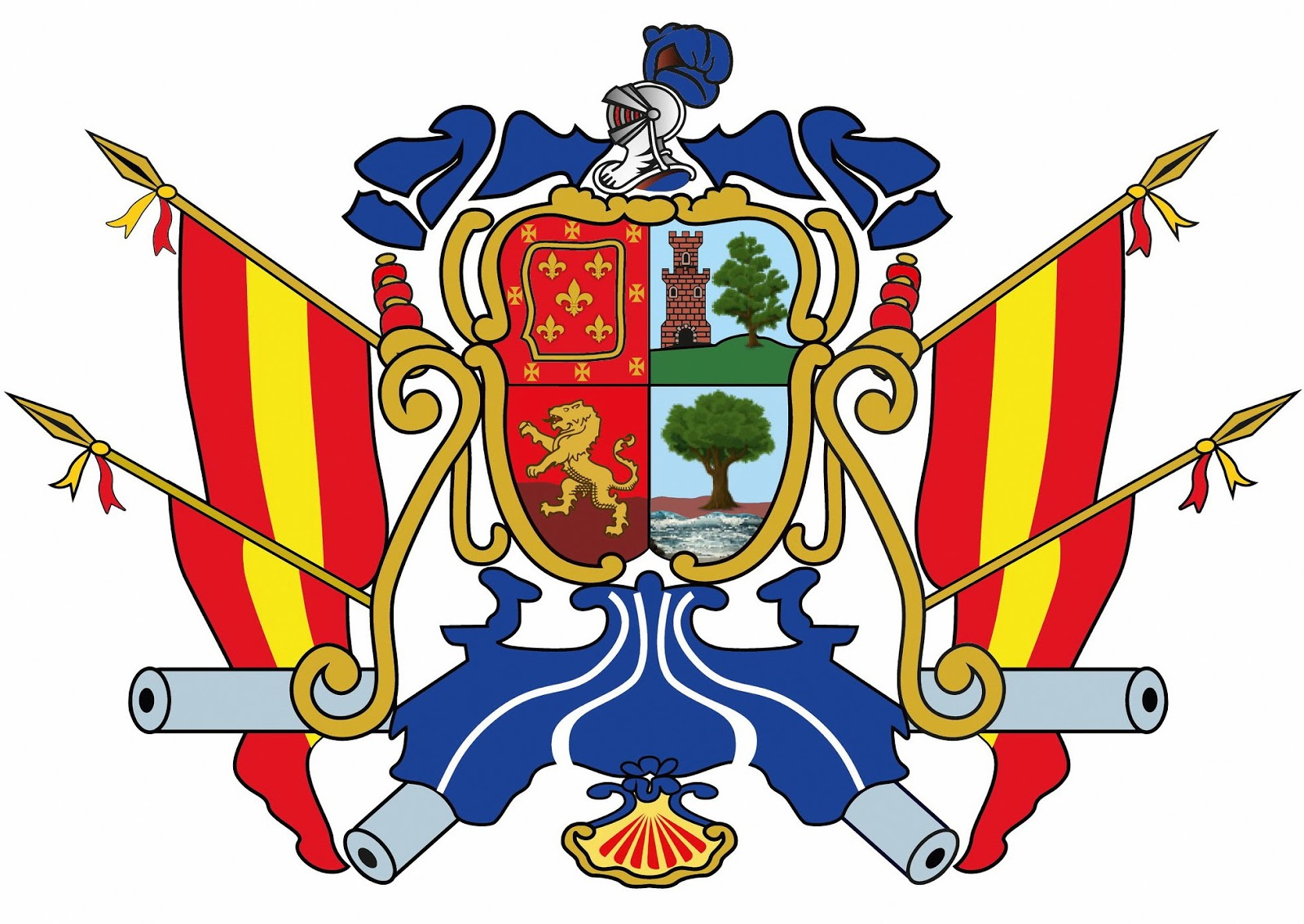
- Coat of arms

- Location of Camaná in Arequipa Region
- Coordinates: 16.623561°S 72.709183°W
- Country: Peru
- Region: Arequipa Region
- Capital: Camaná

Government
  - Mayor: Marcelo Alejandro Valdivia Bravo (2019-2022)

Area
  - Total: 3,998.28 km^{2} (1,543.74 sq mi)

Population
  - Total: 59,370
  - Density: 14.85/km^{2} (38.46/sq mi)
- UBIGEO: 0402

Camaná is a province in the Arequipa Region, Peru. It borders the provinces of Caravelí, Condesuyos, Castilla, Caylloma, Arequipa and Islay.

The province was struck by the 2001 southern Peru earthquake, which occurred on June 23, 2001.

== Political division ==
The province is divided into eight districts (Spanish: distritos, singular: distrito):

- Camaná (Camaná)
- José María Quimper (El Cardo)
- Mariano Nicolás Valcárcel (Urasqui)
- Mariscal Cáceres (San José)
- Nicolás de Piérola (San Gregorio)
- Ocoña (Ocoña)
- Quilca (Quilca)
- Samuel Pastor (La Pampa)

== Ethnic groups ==
The province is inhabited by indigenous citizens of Quechua descent. Spanish is the language which the majority of the population (84.02%) learnt to speak in childhood, 13.30% of the residents started speaking using the Quechua language and 2.57% using Aymara (2007 Peru Census).

== See also ==
- Wamp'uy
