= Camaná District =

Coordinates: 16°37′S 72°43′W

Camaná
- District
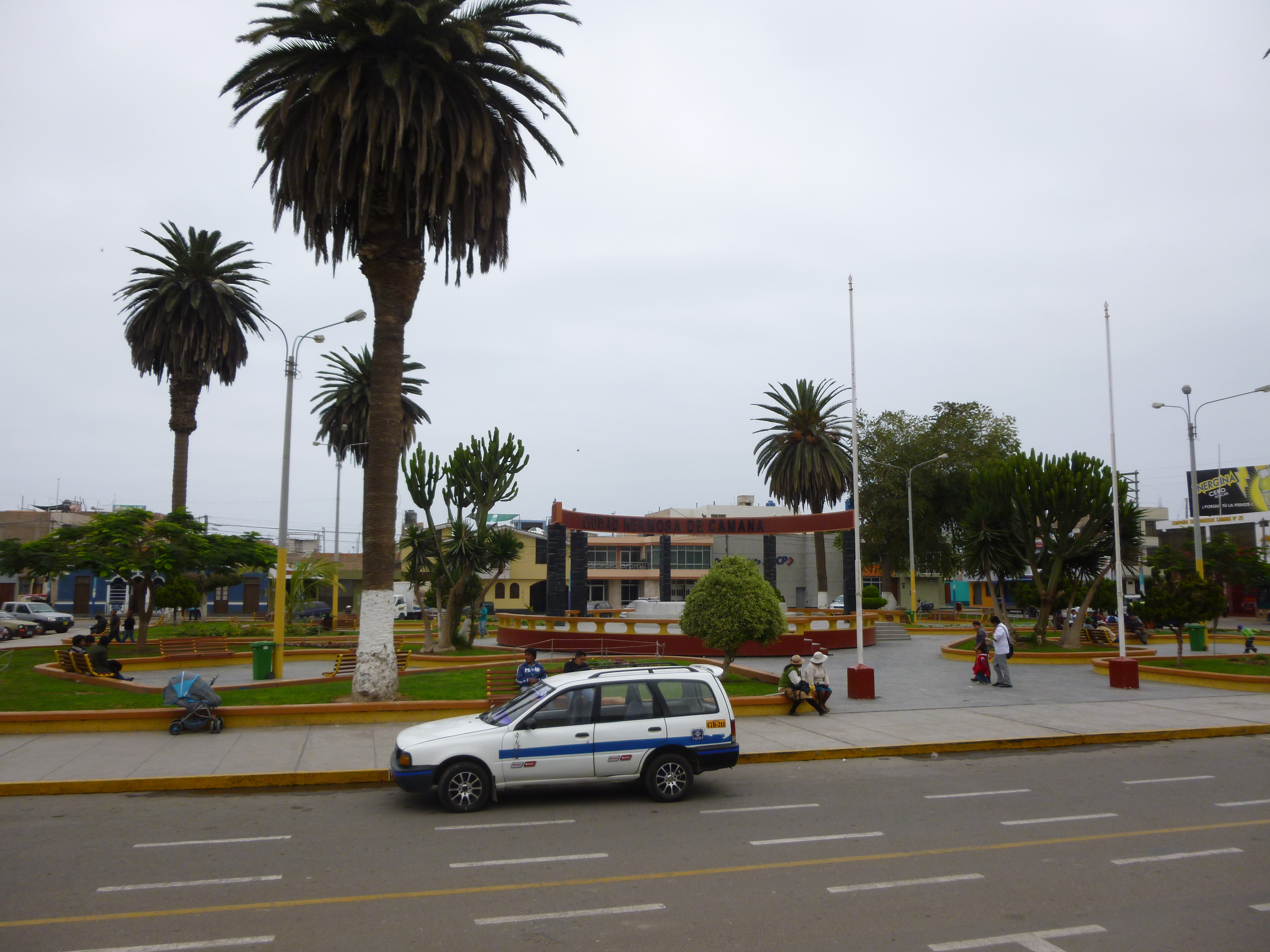
- Main square of Camaná

- Coat of arms
- Interactive map of Camaná
- Country: Peru
- Region: Arequipa
- Province: Camaná
- Capital: Camaná

Government
  - Mayor: Marcelo Alejandro Valdivia Bravo (2019-2022)

Area
  - Total: 11.67 km^{2} (4.51 sq mi)
- Elevation: 12 m (39 ft)

Population (2017)
  - Total: 13,367
  - Density: 1,145/km^{2} (2,967/sq mi)
- Time zone: UTC-5 (PET)
- UBIGEO: 040201

Camaná District is one of eight districts of the province Camaná in Peru.
