= Chancay culture =

1000–1470 pre-Hispanic civilization in Peru

Chancay
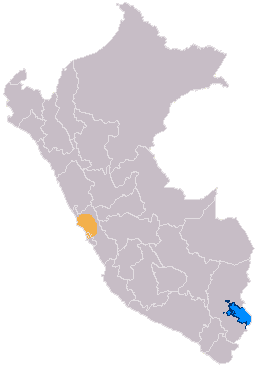
- Map of the Chancay culture's location in Peru
- Geographical range: Department of Lima: Fortaleza valley Pativilca Valley; Supe valley Huaura valley Chancay valley Chillón valley Rimac valley Lurin valley
- Period: Late Intermediate
- Dates: c. 1000 - 1470
- Preceded by: Wari
- Followed by: Inca Empire

The Chancay were a pre-Hispanic archeological civilization that developed between the valleys of Fortaleza, Pativilca, Supe, Huaura, Chancay, Chillón, Rimac and Lurín, on the central coast of Peru, from about 1000 to 1470 CE.

== History ==
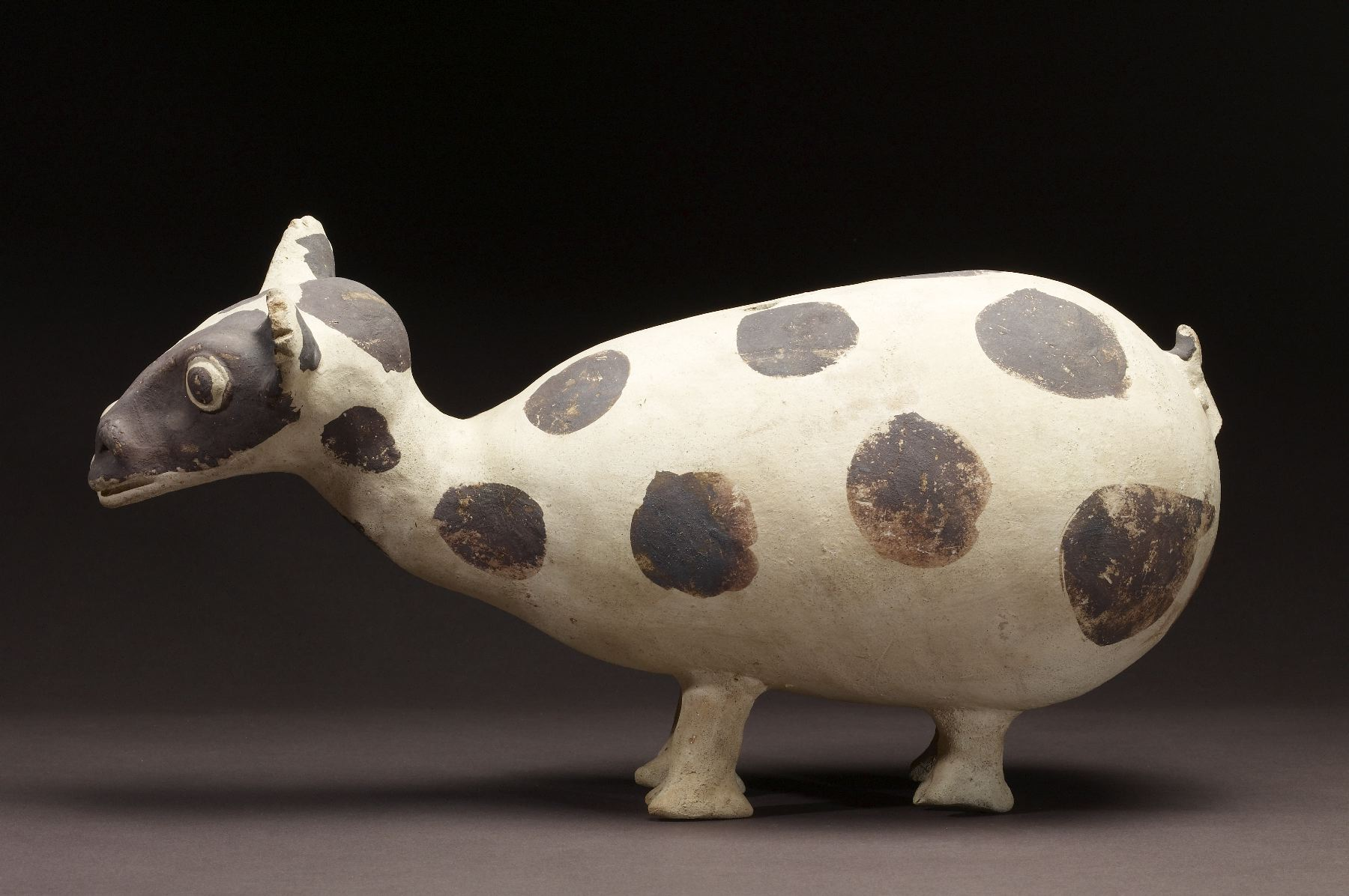
Llama effigy (earthenware, slip paint)

Not much is known about the Chancay civilization, which developed in the later part of the Inca Empire. This culture emerged after the fall of the Wari civilization. Parts of the southern Chancay area were conquered by the Chimú in the early 1400s, and by about 1450 CE the Incas were occupying both areas. The Chancay likely had a centralized political structure and formed a small regional state. Thus the Chancay culture declined in the later 15th century, as the Inca Empire expanded into their lands.

Occupying the central coast coastal region of Peru, the Chancay were centered mostly in the Chancay and Chillón valleys, although they also occupied other areas such as the Rimac and Lurin valley areas. The center of the Chancay culture was located 80 kilometers north of Lima. It is a desert region but has fertile valleys bathed by rivers and is rich in resources that allowed for, among other things, extensive agricultural development.

The Chancay developed intense trade relations with other regions, allowing them to interact with other cultures and settlements in a wide area.

== Economy ==
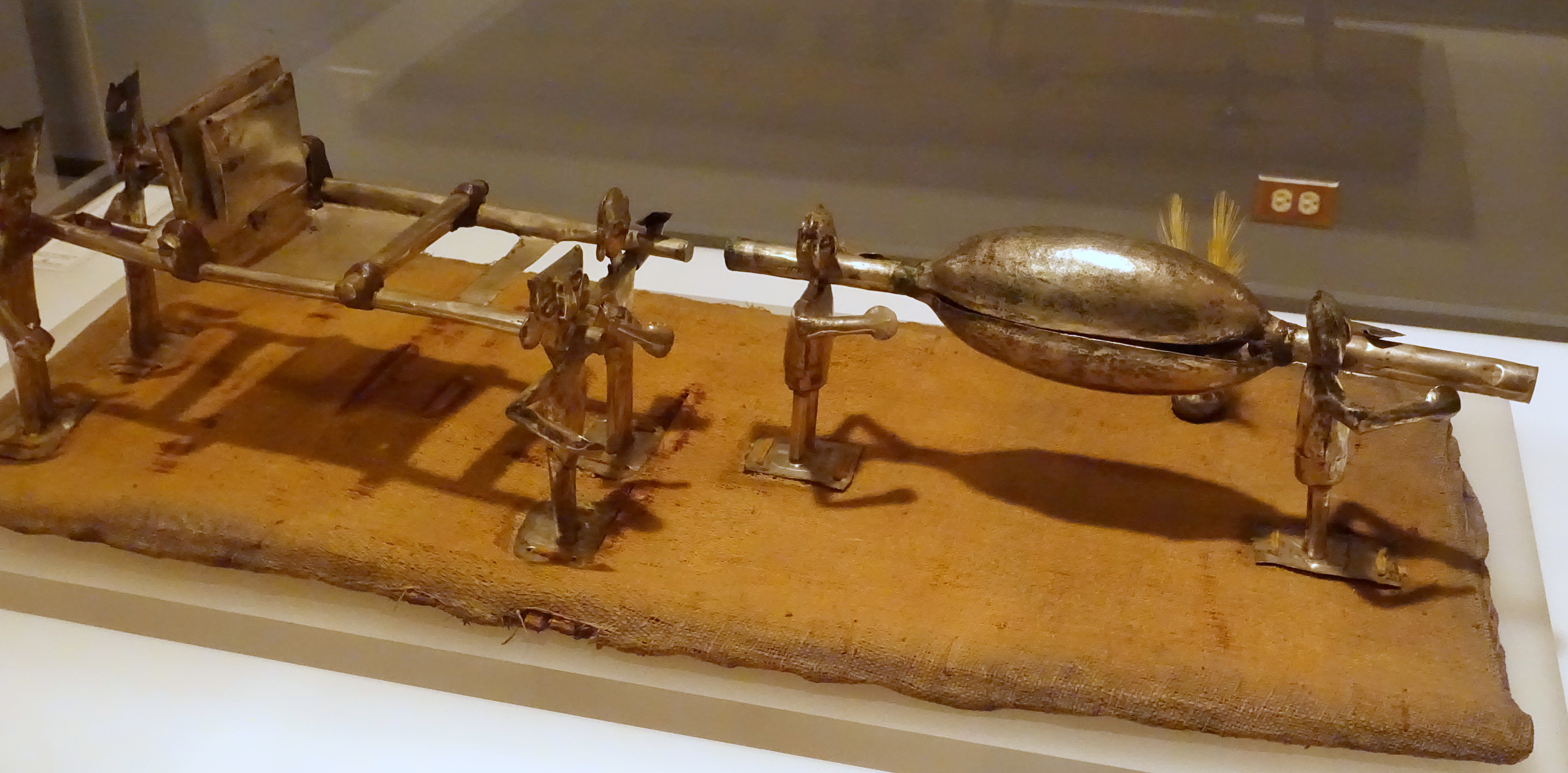
Model funeral cortege (silvered copper, cotton, reeds, feathers)

The Chancay culture based its economy on agriculture, fishing and trade. Water reservoirs and irrigation canals were built by engineers in order to develop agriculture. As the culture was geographically located on the oceanfront, they were involved in traditional fishing both from the shore as well as further out to sea from their caballitos de totora, an ancient type of watercraft unique to Peru. The Chancay also traded with other regions either by land towards the Peruvian highlands and jungle or by sea to the north and south of their borders.

The settlements in Lauri, Lumbra, Tambo Blanco, Handrail, Pisquillo Chico and Tronconal focused mainly on artisans producing large-scale ceramics and textiles.

The Chancay culture is the first of the Peruvian cultures that had mass production of ceramics, textiles and metals such as gold and silver which were ritualistic and domestic goods. They were also noted for their wood carved items.

The curacas, political leaders, regulated the production of artisans, farmers and ranchers in addition to overseeing festive activities.

== Textiles ==
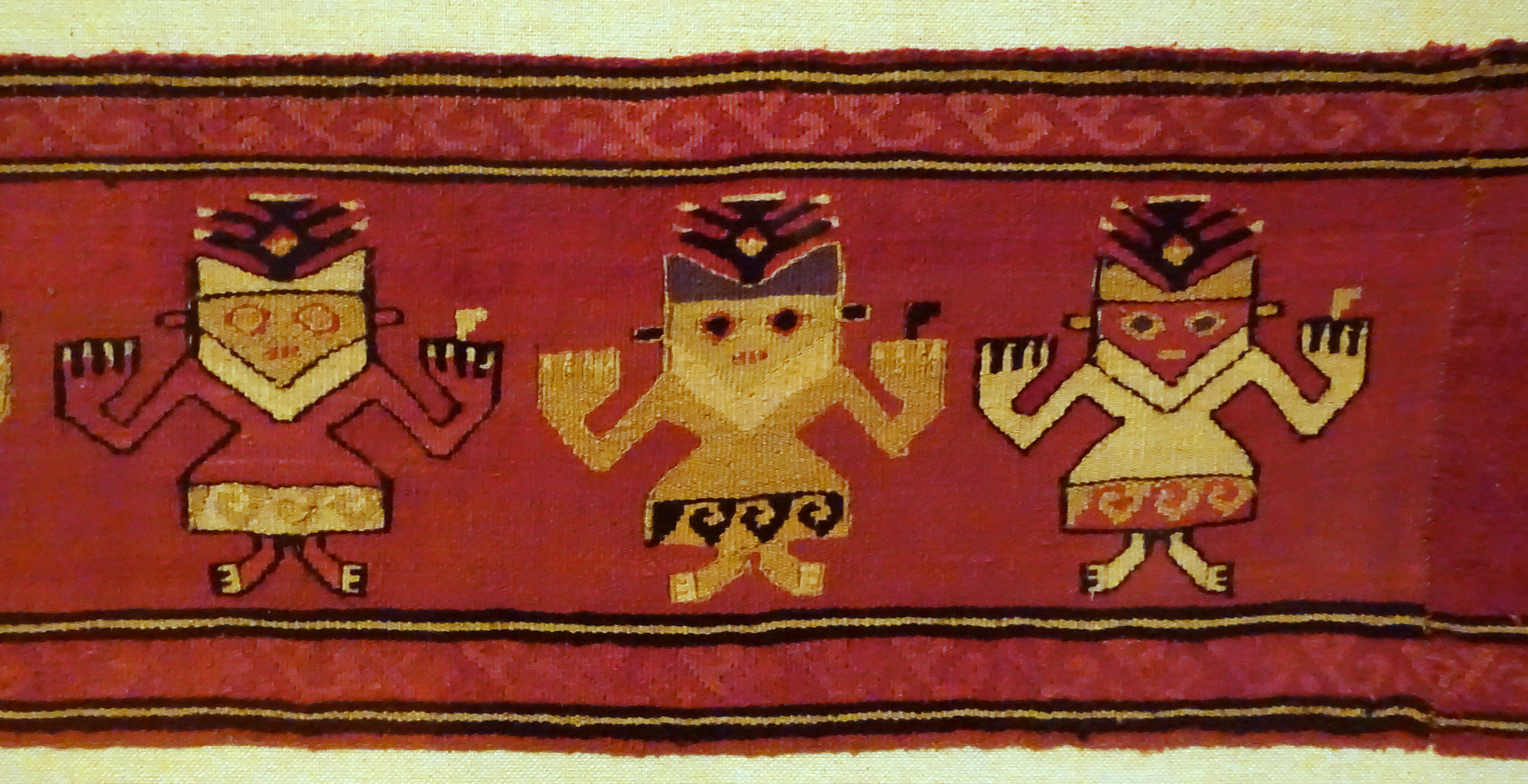
Mantle border fragment of funerary cloth with anthropomorphic feline figures

The most well-known Chancay artefacts are the textiles which ranged from embroidered pieces, different types of fabrics decorated with paint. A variety of techniques, colours and themes were used in the making of textiles. They used an array of colours including yellows, browns, scarlet, white, blues and greens.

In type of fabric used include llama wool, cotton, chiffon, and feathers. Their technique involved were decorated open weave, brocade, embroidery, and painting. Brushes were used to paint anthropomorphic, zoomorphic, geometric and other creative designs directly on the canvases. The Chancay are known for the quality of their painted tapestries. The typically geometric designs also included drawings of plants, animals such as fish, cats, birds, monkeys and dogs (most notably the hairless Peruvian dog) as well as human figures. Some of the human fiber sculptures are elaborate and include such scenes as a mother teaching her daughter to weave on a backstrap loom. Birds and deities wearing crescent-like headdresses were one of the more common decorative features. They produced a variety of goods such as clothing, bags, and funeral masks.

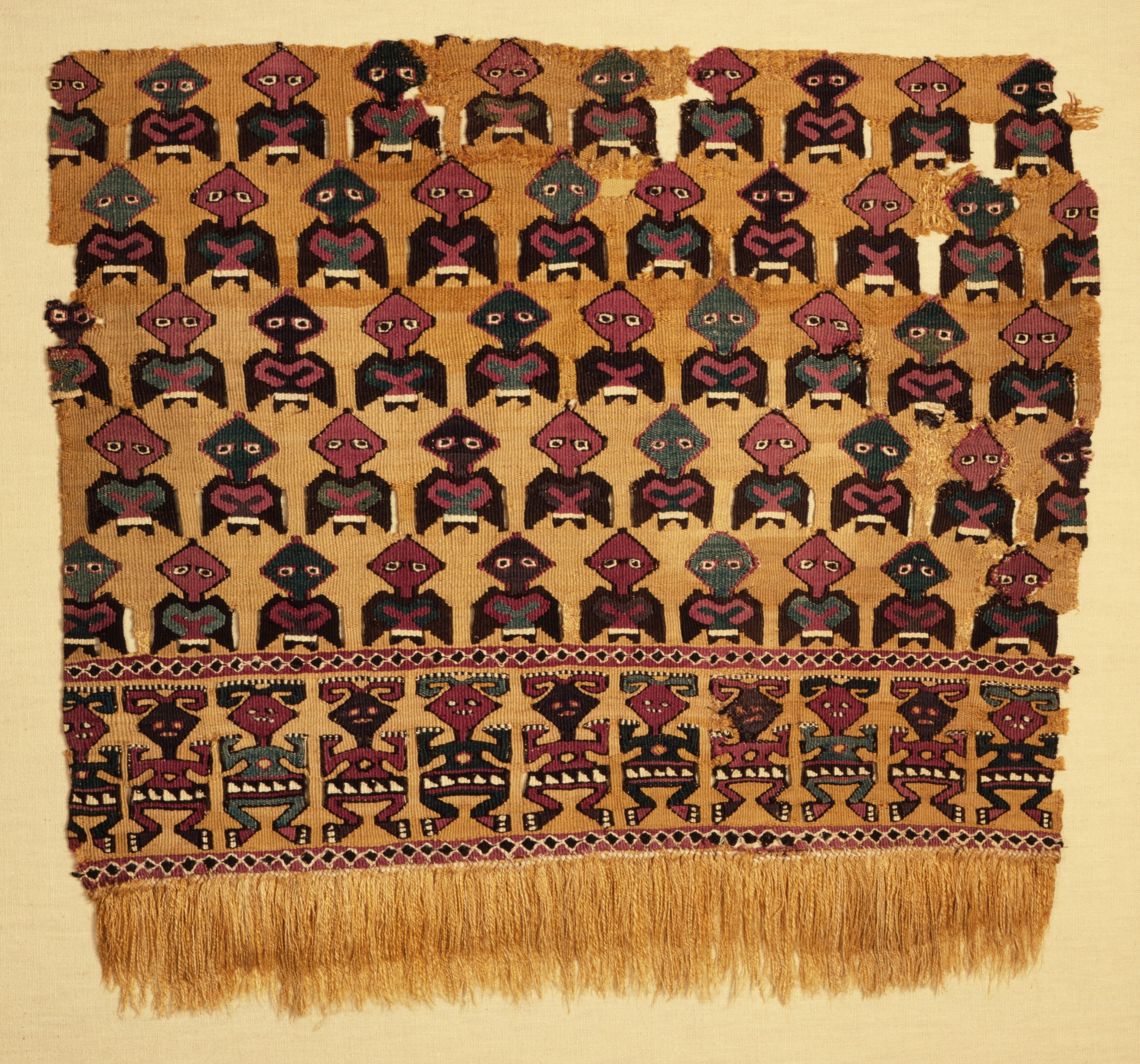
Textile fragment with design of stylized birds and humans

Many Chancay textiles survive to date. It is believed that their production was quite extensive, due to the quantities that have been preserved. The quality of the textile material appears to be good as they were carefully made.

Canvases or gauzes were used primarily for religious and magical purposes. They were made for covering the head of the dead in the form of a headdresses. According to the beliefs of the time, the threads on these fabrics had to be spun in the form of an "S" in an anticlockwise direction. This thread, which had a magical character, was called lloque and, according to legend, the garments were infused with supernatural powers and served as protection in the afterlife. Feathers were inserted into a main thread which was then sewn onto the fabric.

The Chancay also manufactured dolls and other objects covered with pieces of woven fabric and various threads.

== Ceramics ==
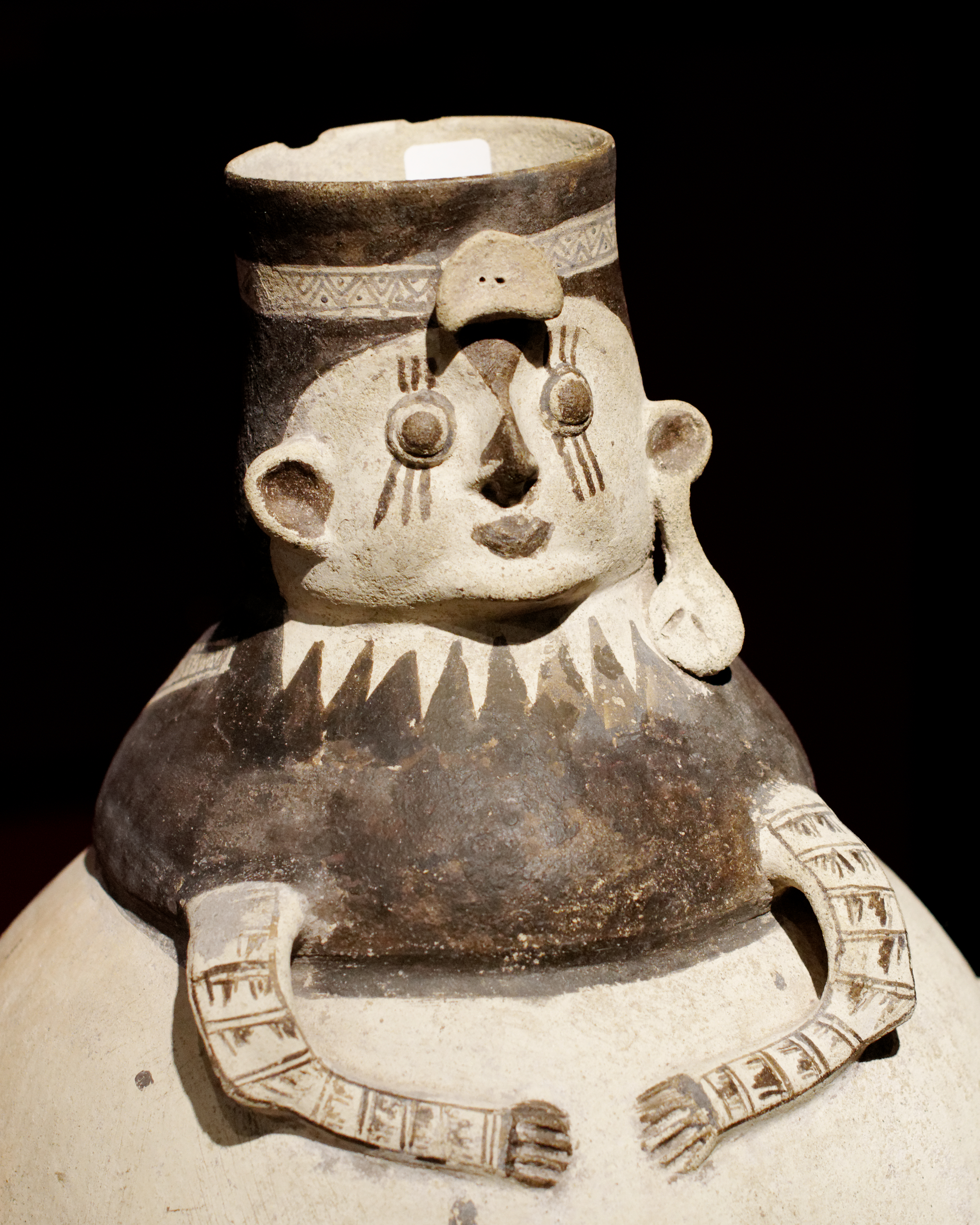
Anthropomorphic urn

Ceramics are also a very common feature of the Chancay culture. This pottery has been found mainly in the cemeteries of the Ancon and Chancay valleys, for example at Ancon (archaeological site). The Chancay civilization produced ceramics on a large scale using moulds. However, open vessels with more than 400 different types of drawings that have yet to be decrypted, uniquely created by artisans, have been found.

The technique used in creating ceramics was with a rough matt surface that was later painted with a dark colour, usually black or brown, on top of a lighter cream or white background. this dark on light characteristic is known as black on white.

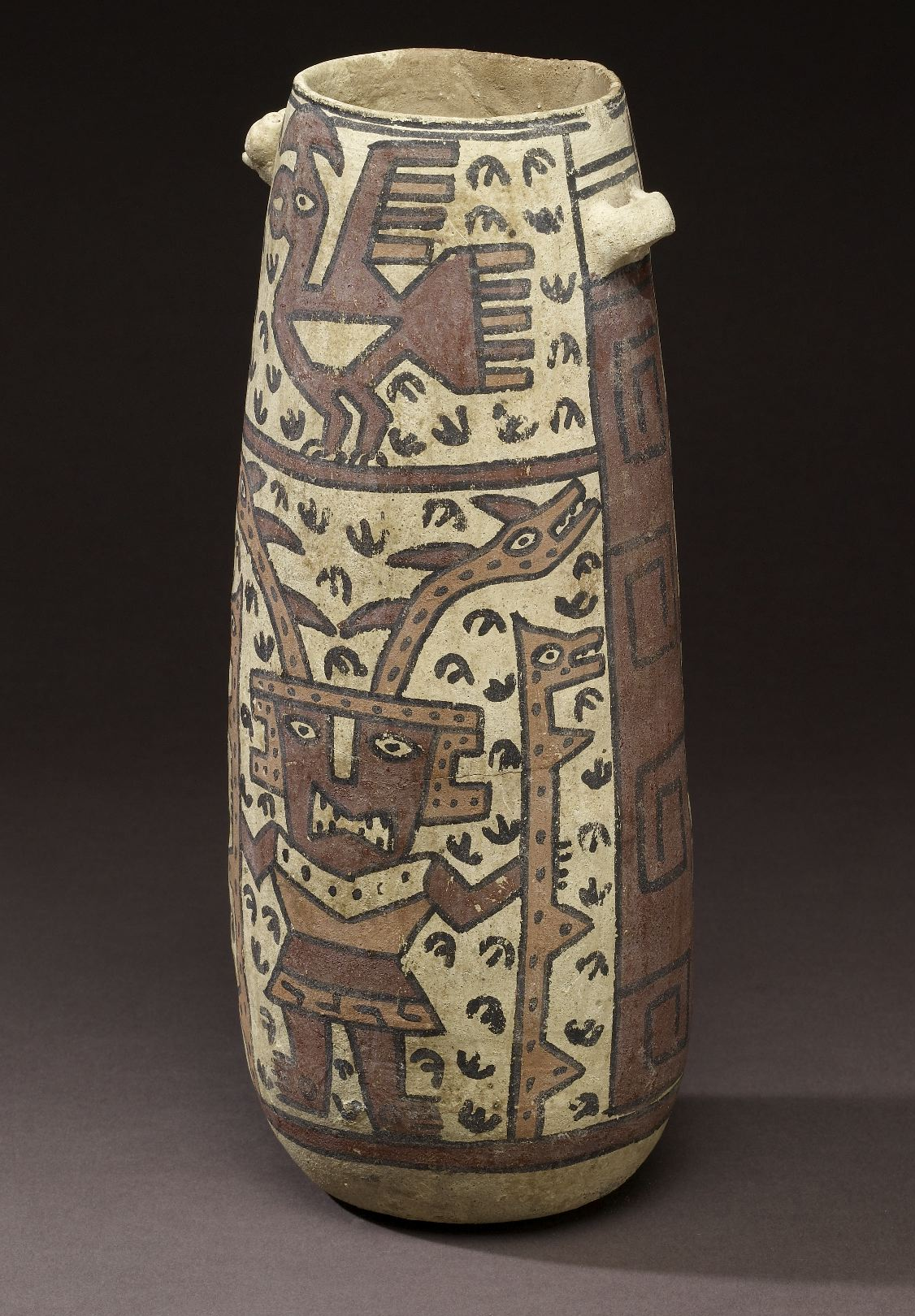
Ceramic vessel (earthenware, slip paint)

Vessels are often large and quaintly shaped. Egg-shaped jars are some of the more common. Ceramic dolls or female figurines were also created. These were usually large, female-looking dolls made from clay. The faces and sometimes the upper sections of the body are covered with ornaments of different geometric shapes. Imprints of textiles on some ceramic human effigies demonstrate that human figures, often painted nude with body art, were dressed in real clothing, granting them reality and vital energy. The eyes were accentuated with a line on each side and the arms were usually short. These geometric ornamentations are very common on Chancay ceramics.

Other common ceramic vessels were oblong jars with narrow necks and wide mouths, with designs in the form of human faces and geometric shapes painted in the black on cream technique. Other common animal shapes are birds or llamas. Another common class of items were cuchimilcos, small standing human-shaped idols with prominent jaws, wide black painted eyes, and prominent modeled genitalia. These figures are particularly notable for their unusual bodily position, which is characterized by upwardly extended arms with palms that face the viewer. The palms are often blackened. These figures have been found in the tombs of Chancay nobility.

== Woodwork ==
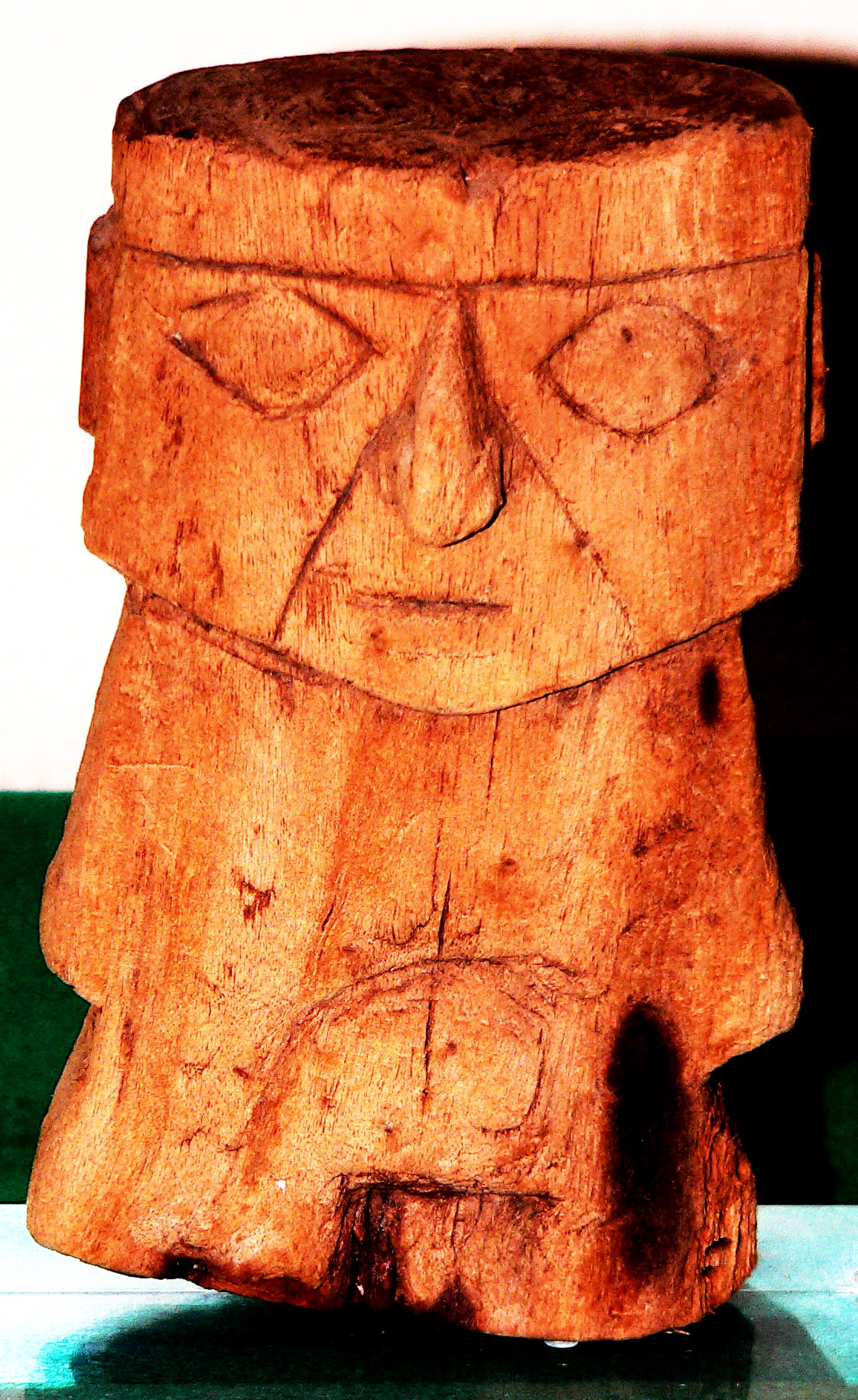
Wooden idol.

The wood carvings done by the Chancay are characterized by their simplicity, sobriety and use of shapes from nature, quite opposed to the sophistication of their textile art. From wood they produced implements of daily use, statues and items for decoration, some of which they painted. Using the wood from their coastal desert the Chancay carved large and small objects, finely engraved with motifs reflecting the marine environment, such as seabirds and boats.

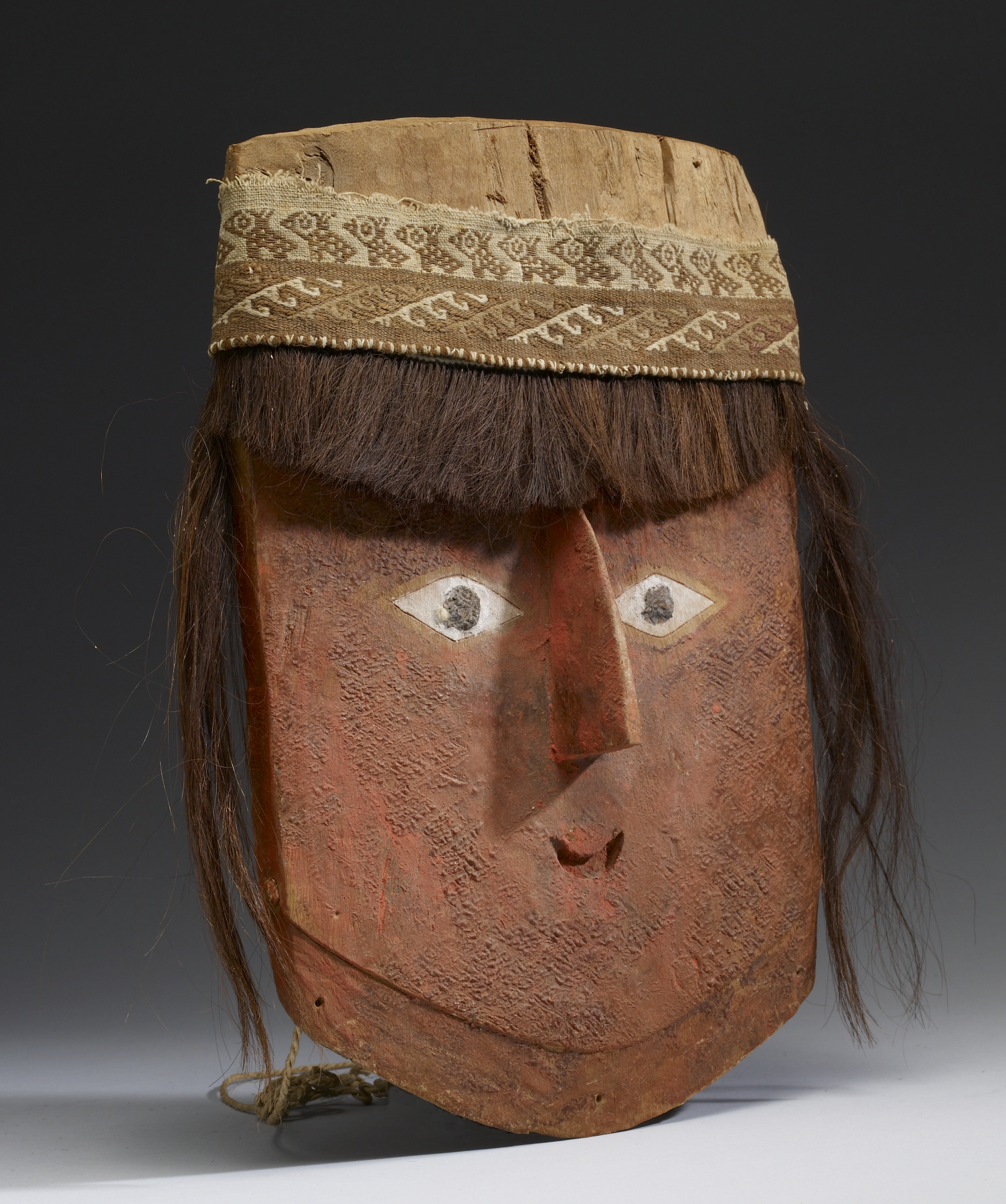
Mummy mask with wig

They also manufactured tools for use in the textile work, in farming and fishing operations, as well as a variety of objects for worship and to distinguish the social status of the populace.

Human heads carved in wood were common. They were used to crown the mummies of important dignitaries, as a mark of their status as deity or mythical ancestor, which they acquired after death. The human images in wood could also be indicators of political power, especially when they were carved into sticks or batons of command.

== Architecture and social organization ==
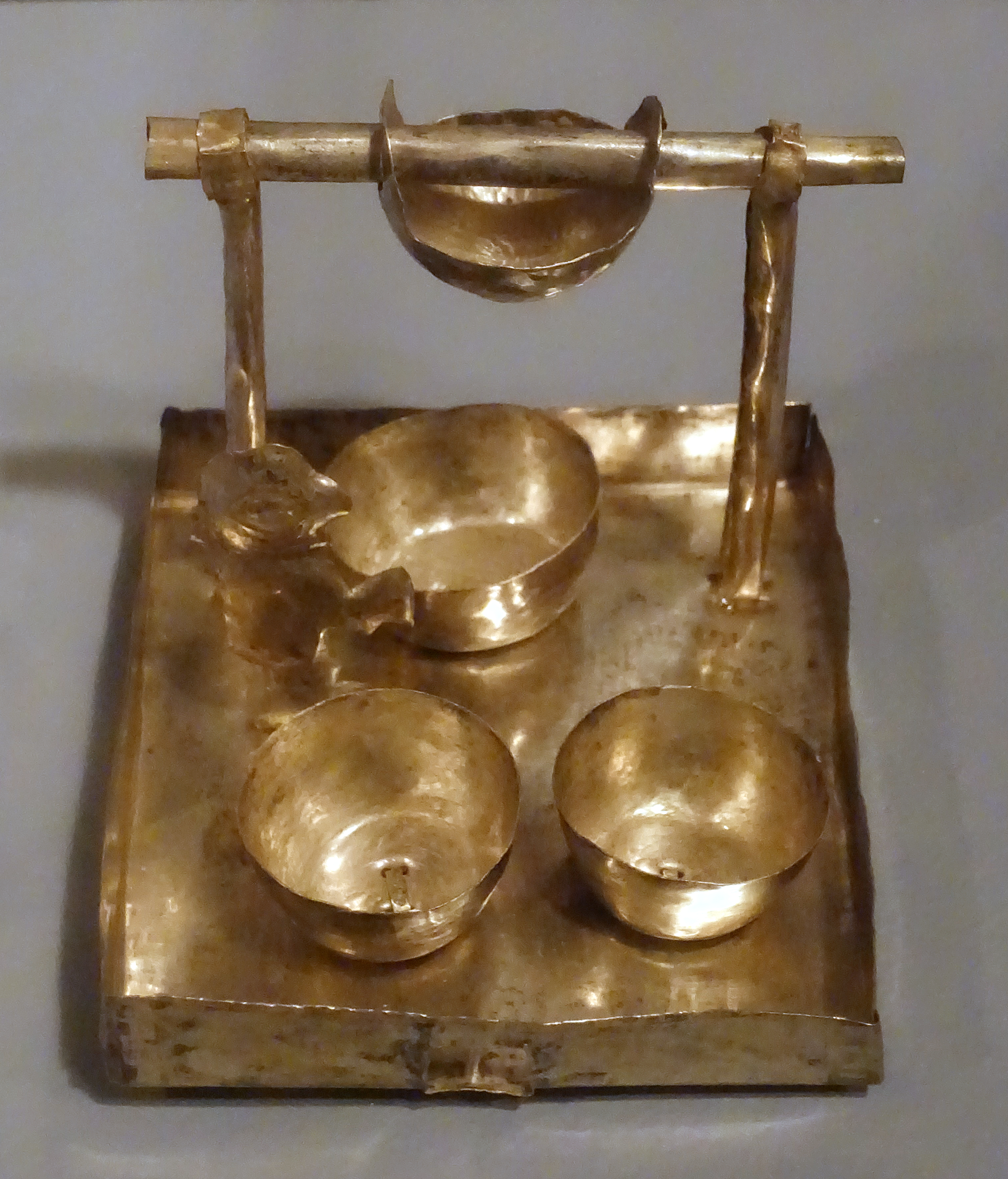
Model tray for making chicha (silvered copper)

With respect to architecture, this civilization is noted for creating large urban centres with pyramid-shaped mounds and complex buildings. It was organized by different types of settlements or ayllus and controlled by leaders or curacas. The urban centres had typical constructions for civic-religious purposes which also included residential palaces. These urban centers were quite large, perhaps due to the mass production of goods.

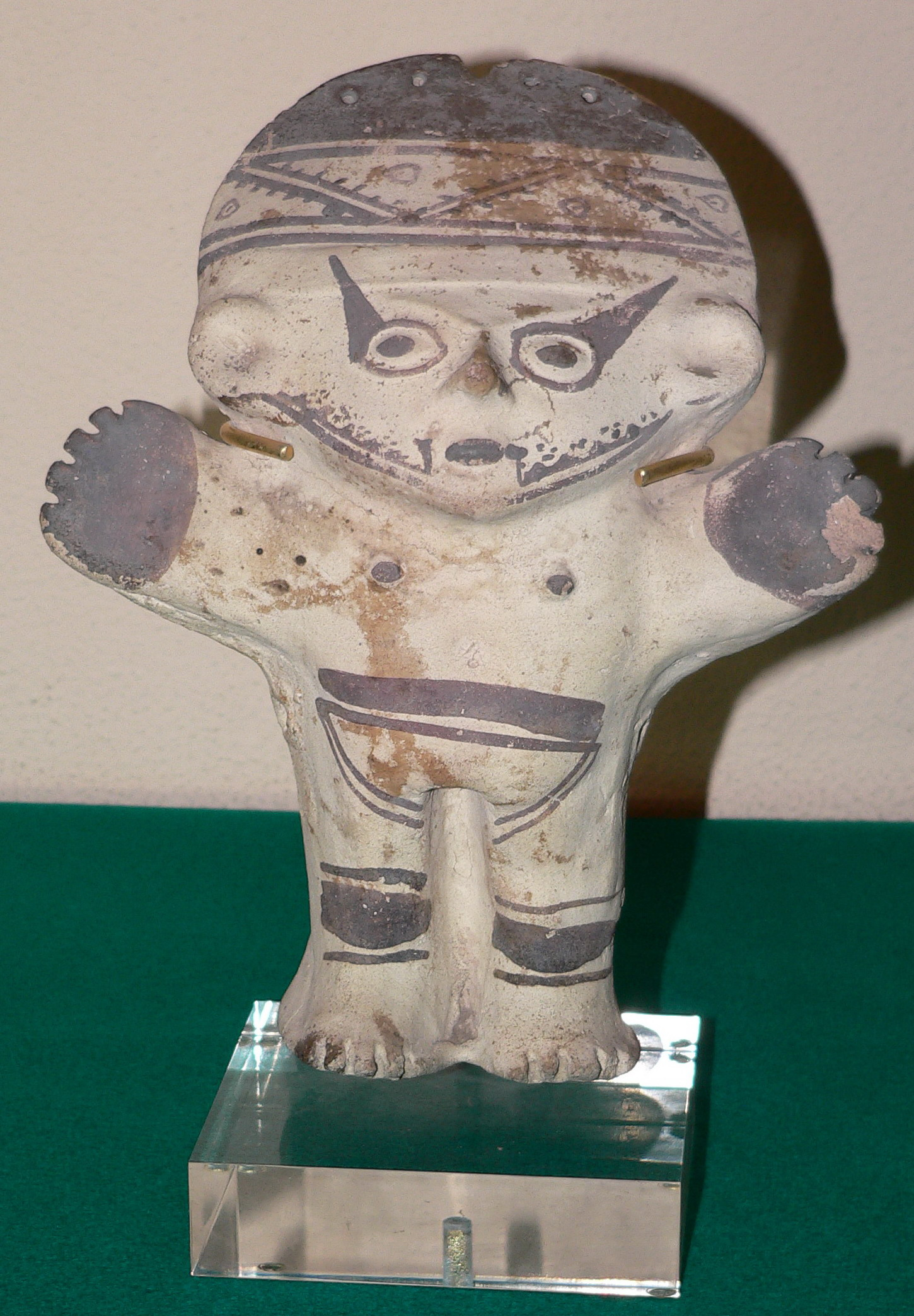
Solid clay idol called cuchimilco from the Chancay culture.

Their culture was marked by social stratification, which was also present in the small towns.

The constructions were mostly made of adobe bricks, were organized in clusters and were also similarly designed according to a specific pattern. Sometimes the most prominent constructions were mixed or combined with stones. Its inhabitants were settled based on their trade so that they could massify the production of goods.

Access to the pyramids was through ramps, i.e. from top to bottom. Their hydraulic engineering works such as reservoirs and irrigation canals were also of great notoriety.

== See also ==
- Chancay, namesake & contemporary town
