= Camana Rock =

Camana Rock (54°10′S 36°37′W) is a rock midway between Kelp Point and Harrison Point in the southern part of Stromness Bay, South Georgia. It was mapped by DI personnel under Lieutenant Commander J.M. Chaplin in 1927 and 1929, and named in 1957 by the UK Antarctic Place-Names Committee for the sailing vessel Camana, owned by Tonsberg Hvalfangeri of Husvik, located at the head of Husvik Harbor in Stromness Bay.
