= Camaná =

Camaná Villa Hermosa de Camaná
- Town
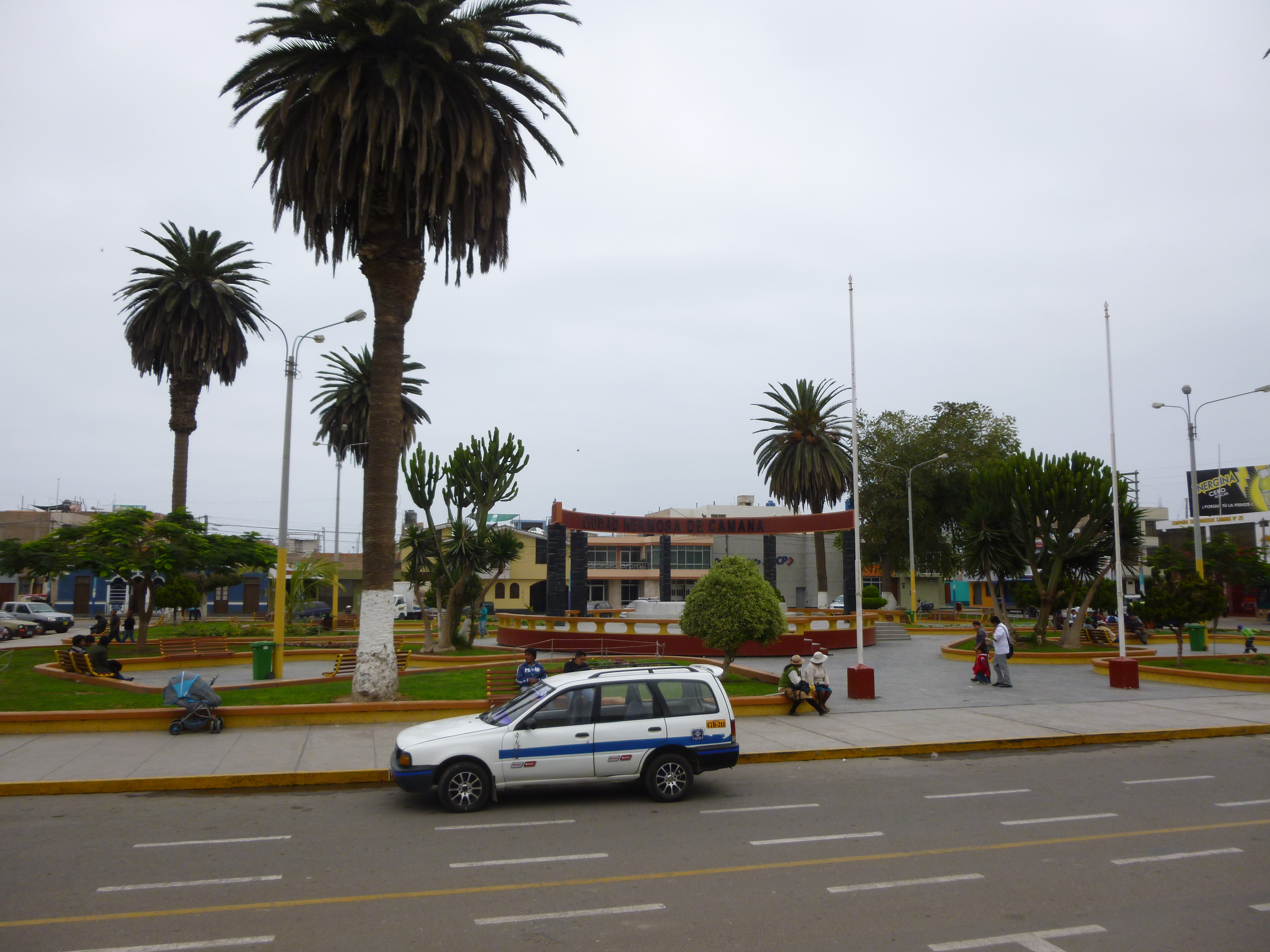
- Main plaza of Camaná

- Location within Peru
- Coordinates: 16°37′24″S 72°42′33″W
- Country: Peru
- Region: Arequipa
- Province: Camaná
- District: Camaná
- Founded: 9 November 1539

Government
  - Mayor: Marcelo Alejandro Valdivia Bravo (2019-2022)
- Elevation: 15 m (49 ft)

Population (2005)
  - Total: 13,304
  - Estimate (2015): 39,026
- Demonym: Camanejo(a)
- Time zone: UTC-5 (PET)
  - Summer (DST): UTC-5 (UTC)
- Website: www.municamana.gob.pe

Camaná is the district capital of the homonymous province, located in the Department of Arequipa, Peru. In 2015, it had an estimate of 39,026 inhabitants.

It lies 180 km from Arequipa, on the Panamerican Highway, which can be traveled in three hours.

== History ==
It is where the Spanish founded "Villa Hermosa" in 1539, moving into the valley of Arequipa in 1540. The city of Arequipa had his first crib in this rich and extensive valley of Camaná.

== Notable persons ==
=== Miss World ===
Madeleine Hartog-Bel, Miss World 1967.
