= Subantarctic =

Term describing the parts of the three largest oceans nearest the Southern Ocean

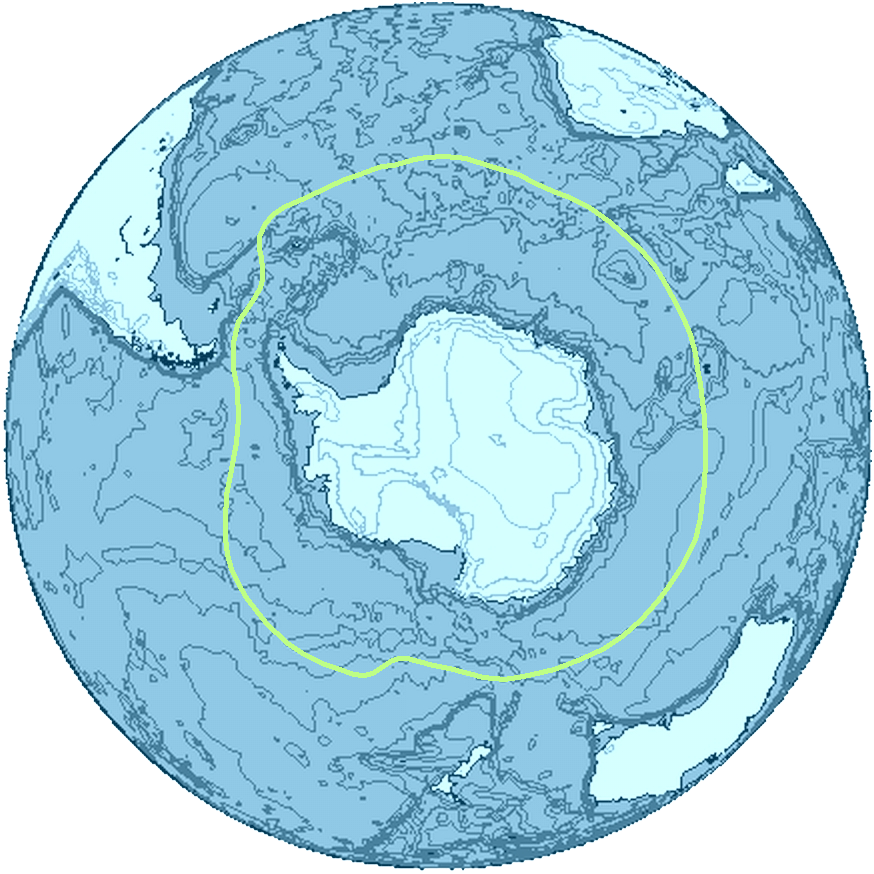
The Antarctic region and its boundary, the Antarctic Convergence

The sub-Antarctic zone is a physiographic region in the Southern Hemisphere, located immediately north of the Antarctic region. This translates roughly to a latitude of between 46° and 60° south of the Equator. The subantarctic region includes many islands in the southern parts of the Atlantic, Indian, and Pacific oceans, especially those situated north of the Antarctic Convergence. Subantarctic glaciers are, by definition, located on islands within the subantarctic region. All glaciers located on the continent of Antarctica are by definition considered to be Antarctic glaciers.

== Geography ==
The subantarctic region comprises two geographic zones and three distinct fronts. The northernmost boundary of the subantarctic region is the rather ill-defined Subtropical Front (STF), also referred to as the Subtropical Convergence. To the south of the STF is a geographic zone, the Subantarctic Zone (SAZ). South of the SAZ is the Subantarctic Front (SAF). South of the SAF is another marine zone, called the Polar Frontal Zone (PFZ). The SAZ and the PFZ together form the subantarctic region. The southernmost boundary of the PFZ (and hence, the southern border of the subantarctic region) is the Antarctic Convergence, located approximately 200 kilometers south of the Antarctic Polar Front (APF).

=== Influence of the Antarctic Circumpolar Current and thermohaline circulation ===
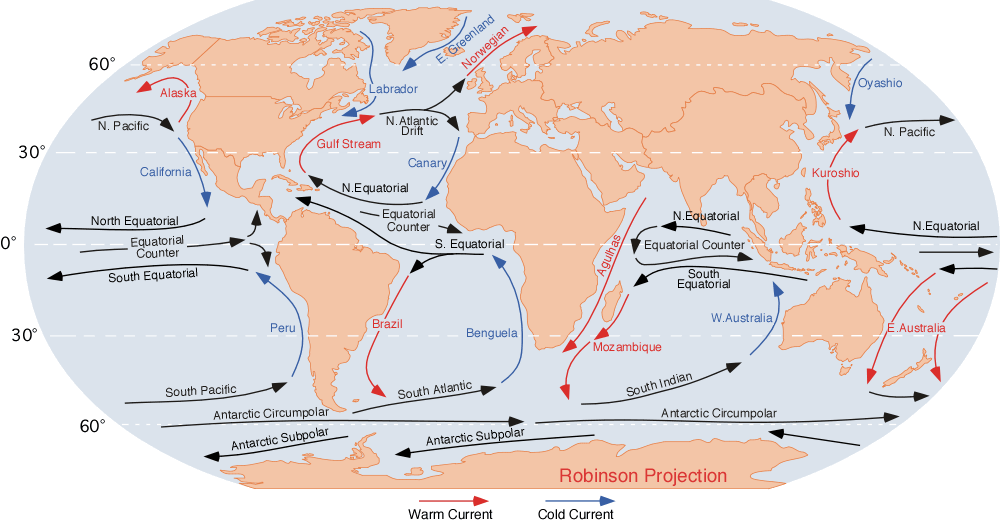
Diagram of the major ocean currents, showing the Antarctic Circumpolar Current (ACC). In addition to the global thermohaline circulation, the ACC strongly influences regional and global climate.

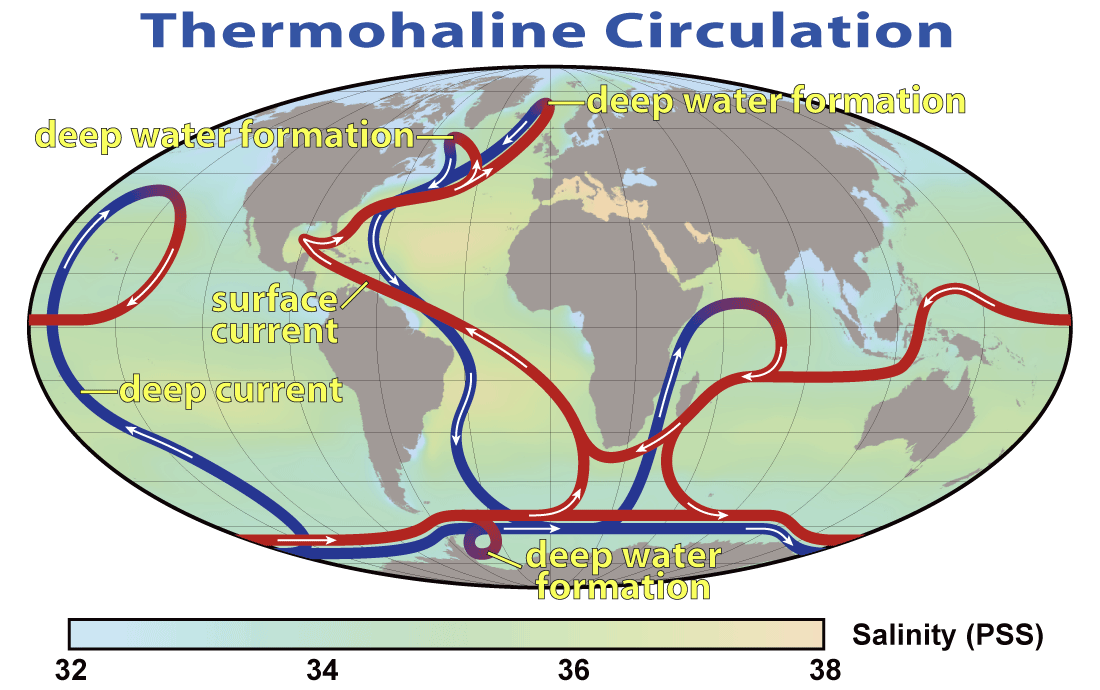
Global thermohaline circulation strongly influences regional and global climate. Blue paths represent deep-water currents, while red paths represent surface currents.

The subantarctic Front, found between 48°S and 58°S in the Indian and Pacific Ocean and between 42°S and 48°S in the Atlantic Ocean, defines the northern boundary of the Antarctic Circumpolar Current (or ACC). The ACC is the most important ocean current in the Southern Ocean, and the only current that flows completely around the Earth. Flowing eastward through the southern portions of the Atlantic, Indian, and Pacific Oceans, the ACC links these three otherwise separate oceanic basins. Extending from the sea surface to depths of 2000–4000 meters, and with a width of as great as 2000 kilometers, the ACC transports more water than any other ocean current. The ACC carries up to 150 Sverdrups (150 million cubic meters per second), equivalent to 150 times the volume of water flowing in all the world's rivers. The ACC and the global thermohaline circulation strongly influence regional and global climate as well as underwater biodiversity.

Another factor that contributes to the climate of the subantarctic region, though to a much lesser extent than the thermohaline circulation, is the formation of Antarctic Bottom Water (ABW) by halothermal dynamics. The halothermal circulation is that portion of the global ocean circulation that is driven by global density gradients created by surface heat and evaporation.

=== Definition of subantarctic: political versus scientific ===
Diagram showing different water masses in the Southern Ocean.

Several distinct water masses converge in the immediate vicinity of the APF or Antarctic Convergence (in particular the Subantarctic Surface Water (Subantarctic Mode Water or SAMW), Antarctic Surface Water, and the Antarctic Intermediate Water). This convergence creates a unique environment, noted for its very high marine productivity, especially for antarctic krill. Because of this, all lands and waters situated south of the Antarctic Convergence are considered to belong to the Antarctic from a climatological, biological and hydrological standpoint. However, the text of the Antarctic Treaty, article VI ("Area covered by Treaty") states: "The provisions of the present Treaty shall apply to the area south of 60° South latitude". Therefore, Antarctica is defined from a political standpoint as all land and ice shelves south of 60°S latitude.

=== Subantarctic islands ===
Antarctica and surrounding islands in relation to the Antarctic Convergence and the 60th parallel south

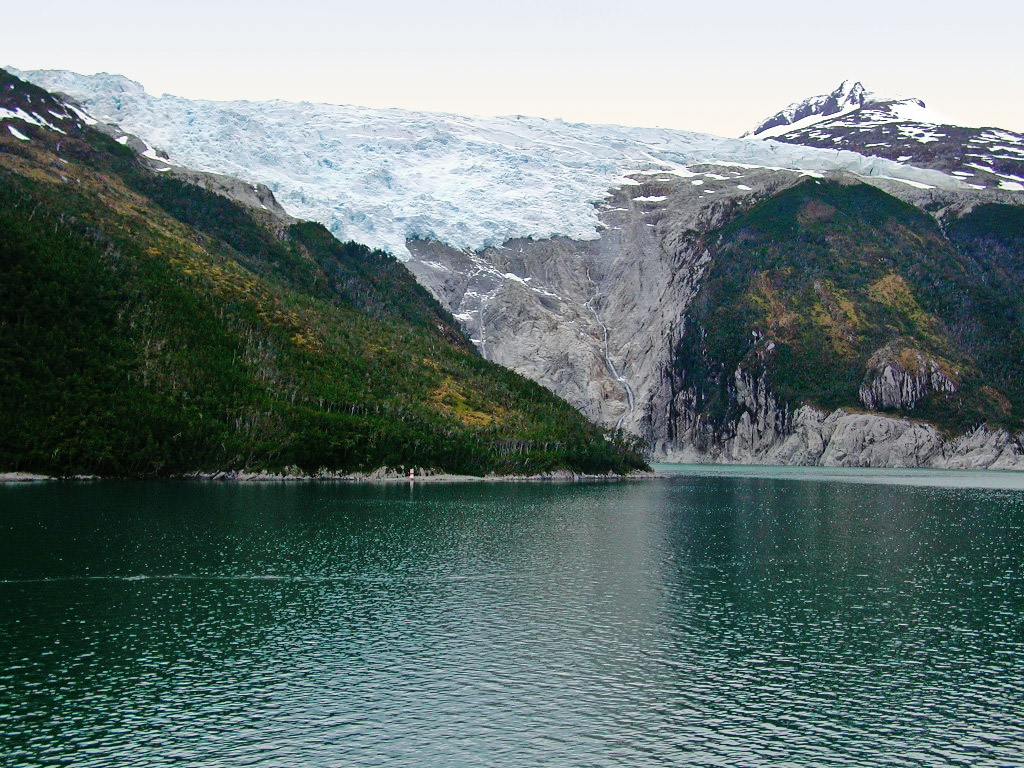
Trees growing along the north shore of the Beagle Channel, 55°S.

At between about 46°–50° south of the Equator, in the region often referred to as the Roaring Forties, are the Crozet Islands, the Prince Edward Islands, Wager Island, the Bounty Islands, the Snares Islands, the Kerguelen Islands, the Antipodes Islands, and the Auckland Islands. The geography of these islands is characterized by tundra, with some trees on the Snares Islands and the Auckland Islands. These islands are all located near the Antarctic Convergence (with the Kerguelen Islands south of the Convergence) and are properly considered to be subantarctic islands.

At between 51°–56° south of the Equator, the Falkland Islands, Isla de los Estados, Ildefonso Islands, Diego Ramírez Islands, and other islands associated with Tierra del Fuego and Cape Horn, lie north of the Antarctic Convergence in the region often referred to as the Furious Fifties. Unlike other subantarctic islands, these islands have trees, temperate grasslands (mostly tussac grass), and even arable land. They also lack tundra and permanent snow and ice at their lowest elevations. Despite their more southerly location, it is debatable whether these islands should be considered as such because their climate and geography differs significantly from other subantarctic islands.

At between 52°–57° south of the Equator, the Campbell Island Group, Heard Island and McDonald Islands, Bouvet Island, the South Georgia Group, Macquarie Island, and the South Sandwich Islands are also located in the Furious Fifties. The geography of these islands is characterized by tundra, permafrost, and volcanoes. These islands are situated close to or south of the Antarctic Convergence, but north of 60° S latitude (the continental limit according to the Antarctic Treaty). Therefore, although some are located south of the Antarctic Convergence, they should still be considered as subantarctic islands by virtue of their location north of 60° S.

At between 60°–69° south of the Equator, in the region often referred to as the Shrieking Sixties, the South Orkney Islands, South Shetland Islands, Balleny Islands, Scott Island, and Peter I Island are all properly considered to be Antarctic islands for the following three reasons:

1. they are all located south of the Antarctic Convergence
2. they are all located within the Southern (or Antarctic) Ocean
3. they are all located south of the 60th parallel south

In light of the above considerations, the following should be considered to be subantarctic islands:

Name	Coordinates	Ocean	Administered by
Antipodes Islands	49°40′S 178°46′E	Pacific Ocean	New Zealand
Auckland Islands	50°42′S 166°05′E	Pacific Ocean	New Zealand
Bounty Islands	47°45′S 179°03′E	Pacific Ocean	New Zealand
Bouvet Island (Bouvetøya)	54°26′S 03°24′E	Atlantic Ocean	Norway
Campbell Island Group	52°32′S 169°08′E	Pacific Ocean	New Zealand
Crozet Islands (French: Îles Crozet or officially Archipel Crozet)	46°25′S 51°59′E	Indian Ocean	France
Heard Island and McDonald Islands (HIMI)	53°04′S 73°00′E	Indian Ocean	Australia
Kerguelen Islands	49°15′S 69°35′E	Indian Ocean	France
Macquarie Island	54°38′S 158°52′E	Pacific Ocean	Australia
Prince Edward Islands	46°46′S 37°51′E	Indian Ocean	South Africa
South Georgia Group	54°30′S 37°00′W	Atlantic Ocean	United Kingdom
South Sandwich Islands	57°30′S 27°00′W	Atlantic Ocean	United Kingdom
Snares Islands	48°01′S 166°32′E	Pacific Ocean	New Zealand

=== Subantarctic glaciers ===
This is a list of glaciers in the subantarctic. This list includes one snow field (Murray Snowfield). Snow fields are not glaciers in the strict sense of the word, but they are commonly found at the accumulation zone or head of a glacier. For the purposes of this list, Antarctica is defined as any latitude further south than 60° (the continental limit according to the Antarctic Treaty).

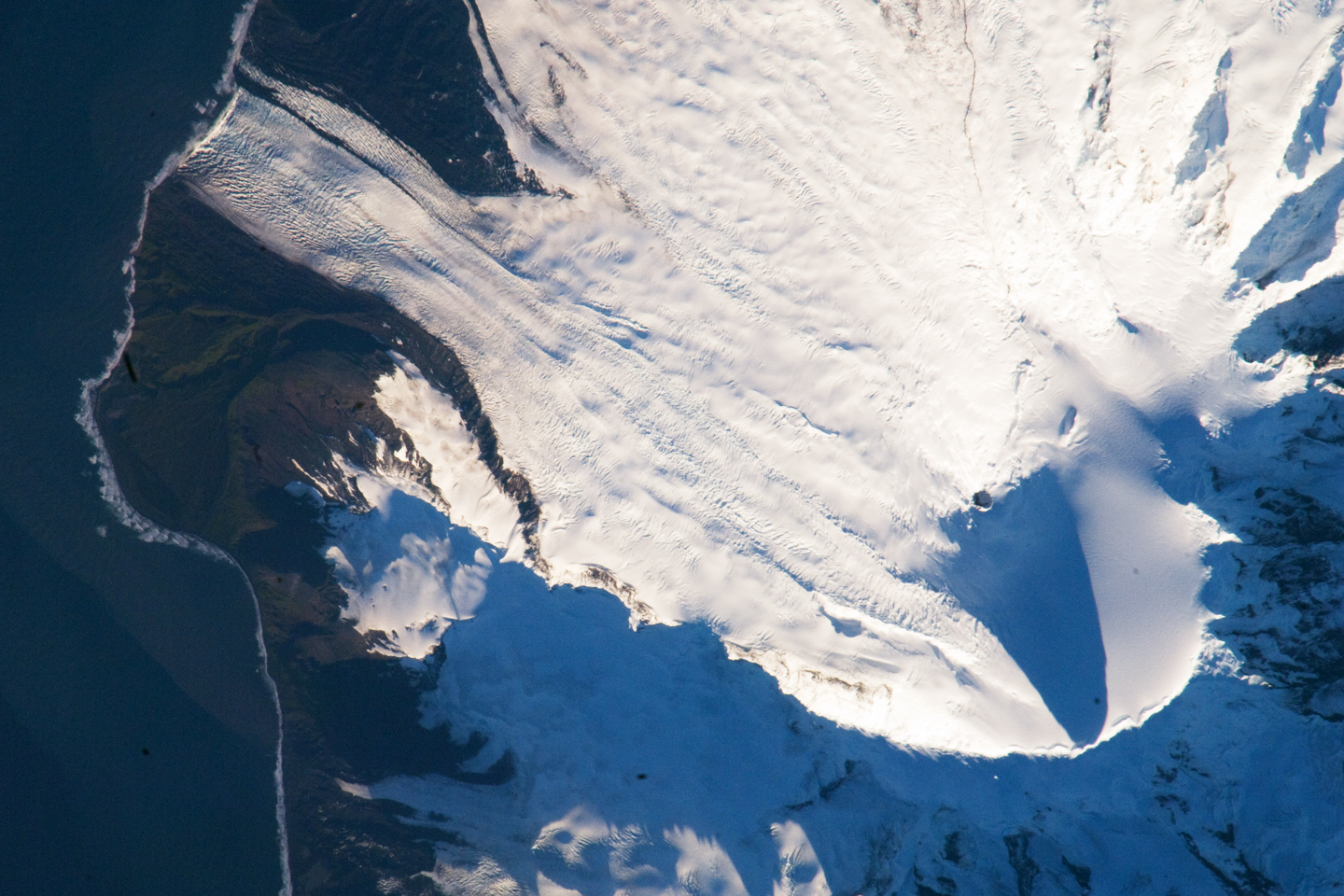
Satellite image of the southern tip of Heard Island. Cape Arkona is seen on the left side of the image, with Lied Glacier just above and Gotley Glacier just below. Big Ben Volcano and Mawson Peak are seen at the lower right side of the image.

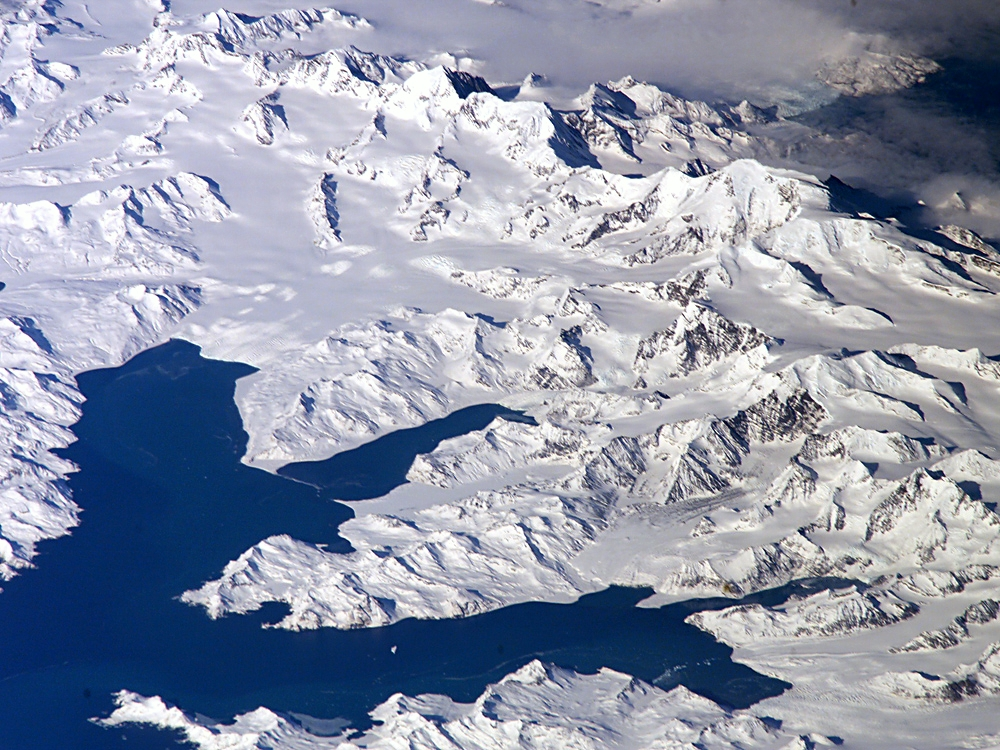
Satellite image of central South Georgia: Harker Glacier, Cumberland Bay, Thatcher Peninsula, Allardyce Range, Mount Paget.

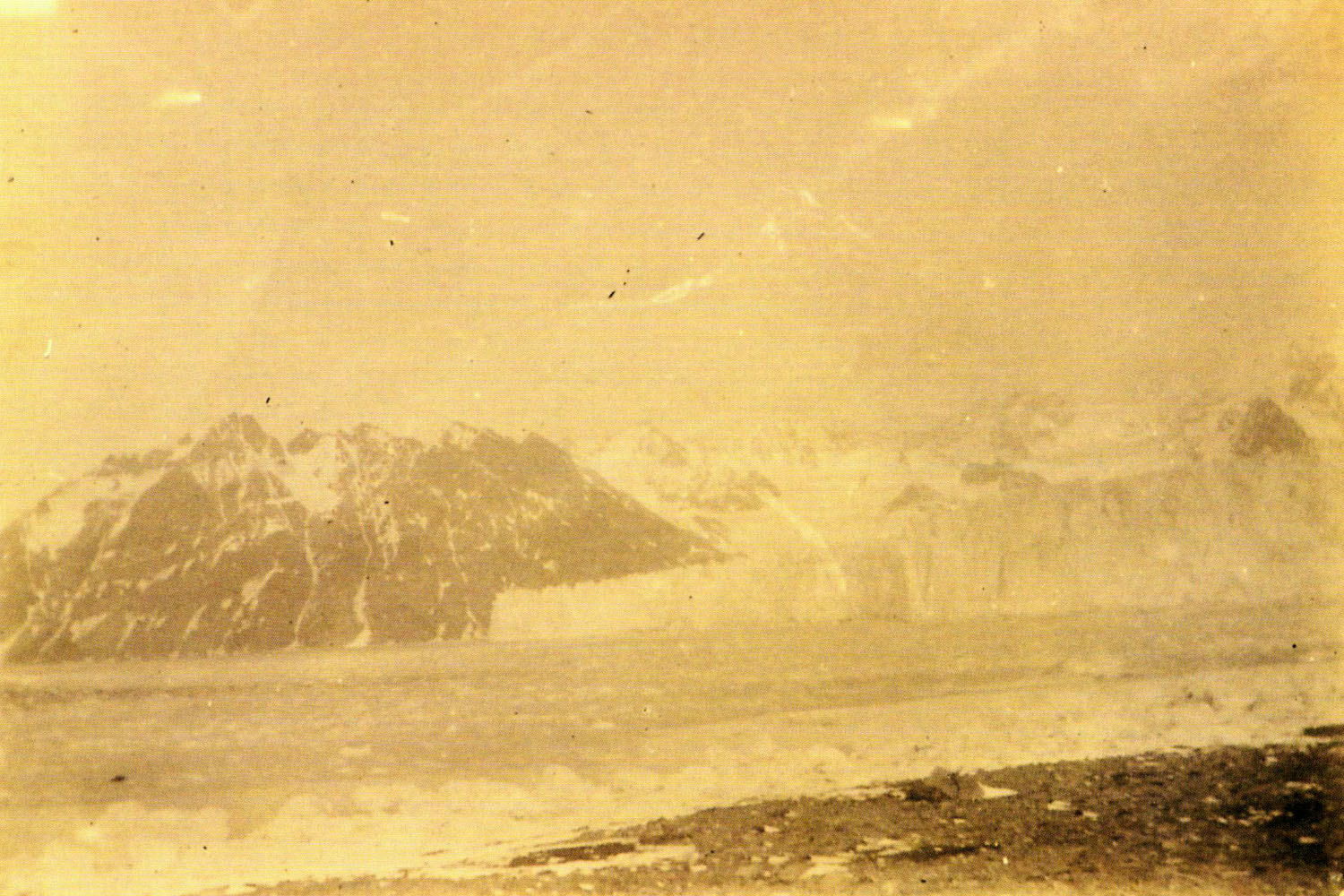
Neumayer Glacier, Cumberland West Bay, South Georgia, circa 1882–1883.

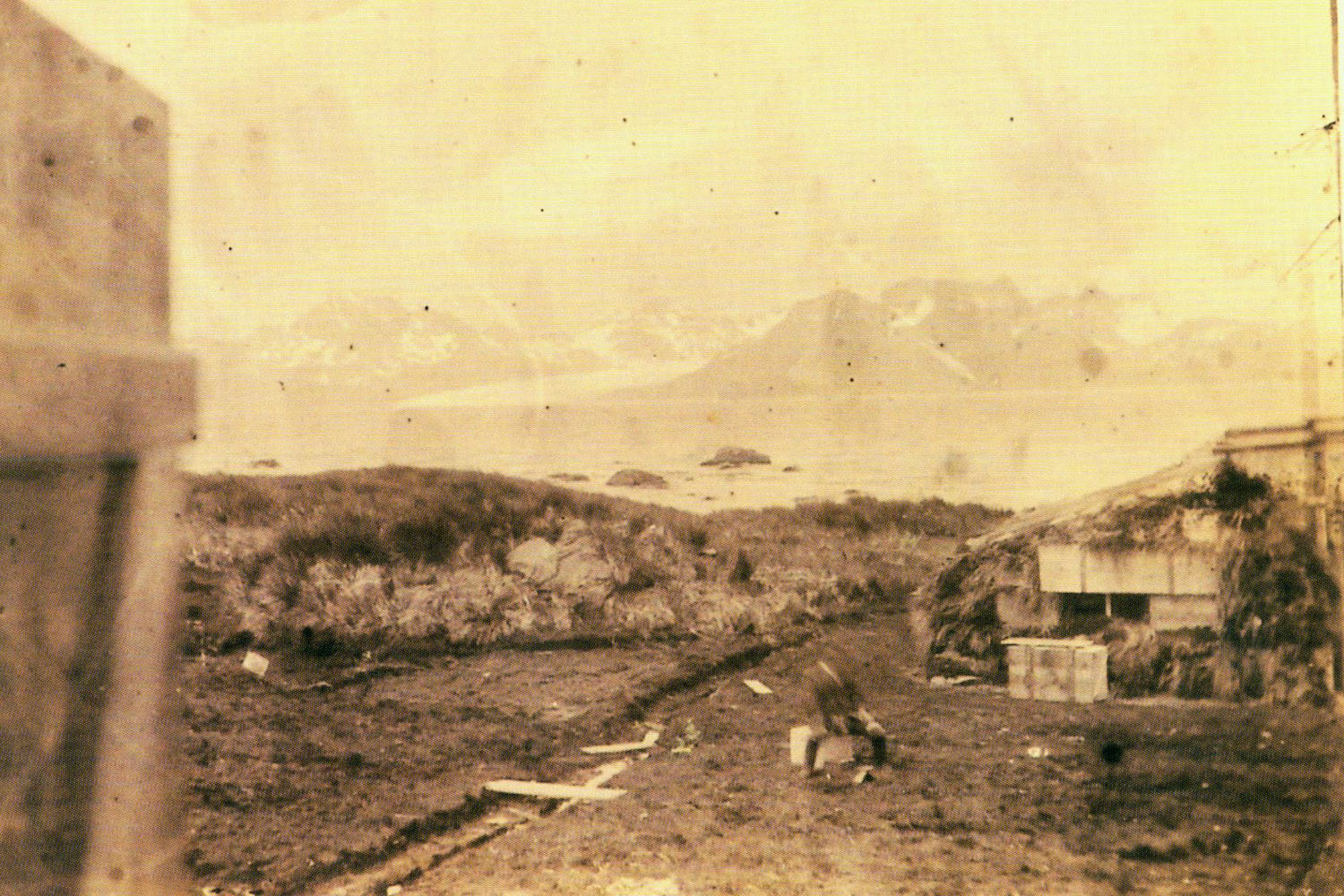
Neumayer Glacier, Cumberland West Bay, South Georgia, circa 1882–1883.

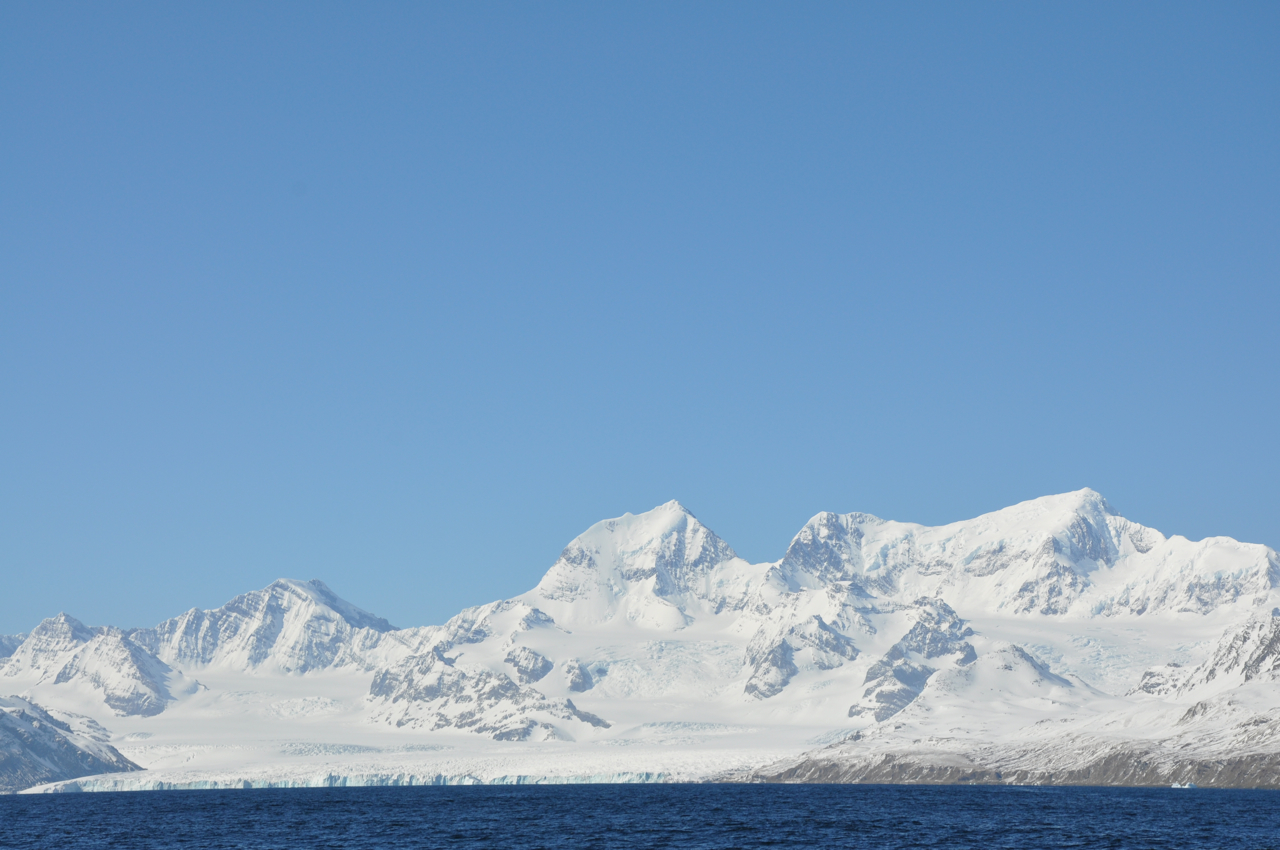
Nordenskjold Glacier, Cumberland Bay, South Georgia.

Name of Glacier	Coordinates	Length or (Width)	Location
Abbotsmith Glacier	53°6′S 73°24′E	4.8 km	Heard Island
Allison Glacier	53°04′S 73°24′E		Heard Island
Austin Glacier	54°4′S 37°12′W		South Georgia Group
Bary Glacier	54°26′S 36°47′W		South Georgia Group
Baudissin Glacier	53°2′S 73°26′E	(2.8 km)	Heard Island
Bertrab Glacier	54°37′S 35°57′W	"small"	South Georgia Group
Bogen Glacier	54°48′S 35°56′W	"small"	South Georgia Group
Briggs Glacier	54°1′S 37°8′W		South Georgia Group
Brøgger Glacier	54°32′S 36°26′W	13 km	South Georgia Group
Brown Glacier	53°4′S 73°39′E		Heard Island
Brunonia Glacier	54°3′S 37°29′W		South Georgia Group
Buxton Glacier	54°26′S 36°12′W		South Georgia Group
Challenger Glacier	53°2′S 73°28′E		Heard Island
Christensen Glacier	54°2′S 36°52′W		South Georgia Group
Christensen Glacier	54°28′S 3°24′E		Bouvet Island
Christophersen Glacier	54°25′S 36°47′W		South Georgia Group
Clayton Glacier	54°4′S 37°26′W		South Georgia Group
Compton Glacier	53°3′S 73°37′E		Heard Island
Cook Glacier	54°27′S 36°11′W		South Georgia Group
Crean Glacier	54°8′S 37°1′W	6 km	South Georgia Group
Deacock Glacier	53°11′S 73°31′E		Heard Island
Dead End Glacier	54°47′S 35°56′W		South Georgia Group
Downes Glacier	53°2′S 73°31′E		Heard Island
Ealey Glacier	53°2′S 73°35′E		Heard Island
Eclipse Glacier	54°23′S 36°5′W		South Georgia Group
Esmark Glacier	54°13′S 37°13′W		South Georgia Group
Fiftyone Glacier	53°11′S 73°34′E		Heard Island
Fortuna Glacier	54°6′S 36°51′W		South Georgia Group
Geikie Glacier	54°17′S 36°41′W		South Georgia Group
Gotley Glacier	53°10′S 73°27′E	13.2 km	Heard Island
Graae Glacier	54°48′S 36°1′W	3.2 km	South Georgia Group
Grace Glacier	54°4′S 37°23′W		South Georgia Group
Hamberg Glacier	54°21′S 36°31′W		South Georgia Group
Harker Glacier	54°22′S 36°32′W		South Georgia Group
Harmer Glacier	54°46′S 36°15′W		South Georgia Group
Heaney Glacier	54°25′S 36°12′W		South Georgia Group
Helland Glacier	54°29′S 36°37′W		South Georgia Group
Henningsen Glacier	54°27′S 36°42′W		South Georgia Group
Herz Glacier	54°41′S 35°58′W		South Georgia Group
Hindle Glacier	54°34′S 36°5′W	10 km	South Georgia Group
Hodges Glacier	54°16′S 36°32′W		South Georgia Group
Horntvedt Glacier	54°25′S 3°21′E		Bouvet Island
Jacka Glacier	53°00′S 73°20′E	1.3 km	Heard Island
Jenkins Glacier	54°46′S 36°7′W		South Georgia Group
Jewell Glacier	54°16′S 37°8′W		South Georgia Group
Keilhau Glacier	54°16′S 37°4′W	8 km	South Georgia Group
Kjerulf Glacier	54°21′S 36°51′W		South Georgia Group
König Glacier	54°1′S 36°48′W		South Georgia Group
Lancing Glacier	54°2′S 36°56′W		South Georgia Group
Lewald Glacier	54°45′S 35°52′W		South Georgia Group
Lied Glacier	53°9′S 73°26′E		Heard Island
Lucas Glacier	54°4′S 37°18′W		South Georgia Group
Lyell Glacier	54°17′S 36°37′W		South Georgia Group
Mary Powell Glacier			Heard Island
Morris Glacier	54°5′S 37°14′W		South Georgia Group
Murray Snowfield	54°9′S 37°9′W		South Georgia Group
Nachtigal Glacier	54°29′S 36°9′W		South Georgia Group
Neumayer Glacier	54°15′S 36°41′W	13 km	South Georgia Group
Nordenskjöld Glacier	54°22′S 36°22′W	"large"	South Georgia Group
Novosilski Glacier	54°4′S 36°18′W	13 km	South Georgia Group
Paget Glacier	54°24′S 36°28′W	6 km	South Georgia Group
Peters Glacier	54°8′S 37°33′W		South Georgia Group
Philippi Glacier	54°49′S 36°3′W		South Georgia Group
Posadowsky Glacier	54°25′S 32°2′E		Bouvet Island
Price Glacier	54°7′S 37°29′W		South Georgia Group
Purvis Glacier	54°6′S 37°1′W		South Georgia Group
Quensel Glacier	54°46′S 35°5′W	"small"	South Georgia Group
Risting Glacier	54°46′S 36°6′W		South Georgia Group
Ross Glacier	54°33′S 36°6′W	10 km	South Georgia Group
Ryan Glacier	54°3′S 37°36′W		South Georgia Group
Salomon Glacier	54°47′S 35°54′W		South Georgia Group
Schmidt Glacier	53°3′S 73°24′E		Heard Island
Schrader Glacier	54°7′S 37°39′W		South Georgia Group
Spenceley Glacier	54°35′S 36°19′W		South Georgia Group
Stephenson Glacier	53°6′S 73°42′E		Heard Island
Storey Glacier	54°47′S 36°1′W		South Georgia Group
Twitcher Glacier	54°43′S 35°56′W	6 km	South Georgia Group
Tyrrell Glacier	54°22′S 36°31′W		South Georgia Group
Vahsel Glacier	53°4′S 73°23′E		Heard Island
Webb Glacier	54°32′S 36°1′W	3.2 km	South Georgia Group
Weddell Glacier	54°35′S 36°00′W	3.2 km	South Georgia Group
Wheeler Glacier	54°36′S 36°22′W	3.2 km	South Georgia Group
Winston Glacier	53°9′S 73°38′E		Heard Island

== Climate ==
=== Impact of climate change on SAMW ===
Air-sea exchange of CO_{2}

Together, the Subantarctic Mode Water (SAMW) and Antarctic Intermediate Water (AAIW) act as a carbon sink, absorbing atmospheric carbon dioxide and storing it in solution. If the SAMW temperature increases as a result of climate change, the SAMW will have less capacity to store dissolved carbon dioxide. Research using a computerized climate system model suggests that if atmospheric carbon dioxide concentration were to increase to 860 ppm by the year 2100 (roughly double today's concentration), the SAMW will decrease in density and salinity. The resulting reductions in the subduction and transport capacity of SAMW and AAIW water masses could potentially decrease the absorption and storage of CO_{2} in the Southern Ocean.

== Flora and fauna ==
The Antarctic realm and Antarctic Floristic Kingdom include most of the subantarctic islands native biota, with many endemic genera and species of flora and fauna.

=== Subantarctic island example ===
The physical landscape and biota communities of Heard Island and McDonald Islands are constantly changing due to volcanism, strong winds and waves, and climate change. Volcanic activity has been observed in this area since the mid-1980s, with fresh lava flows on the southwest flanks of Heard Island. Satellite imagery shows that McDonald Island increased in size from about 1 to 2.5 square kilometers between 1994 and 2004, as a result of volcanic activity.

In addition to new land being produced by volcanism, global warming of the climate is causing the retreat of glaciers on the islands (see section below ). These combined processes produce new ice-free terrestrial and freshwater ecoregions, such as moraines and lagoons, which are now available for colonization by plants and animals.

Heard Island has vast colonies of penguins and petrels, and large harems of land-based marine predators such as elephant seals and fur seals. Due to the very high numbers of seabirds and marine mammals on Heard Island, the area is considered a "biological hot spot". The marine environment surrounding the islands features diverse and distinctive benthic habitats that support a range of species including corals, sponges, barnacles and echinoderms. This marine environment also serves as a nursery area for a range of fishes, including some species of commercial interest.

== Retreat of subantarctic glaciers ==
Retreat of San Rafael Glacier from 1990 to 2000. San Quintín Glacier is shown in the background

Glaciers are currently retreating at significant rates throughout the Southern Hemisphere. With respect to glaciers of the Andes Mountains in South America, abundant evidence has been collected from ongoing research at Nevado del Ruiz in Colombia, Quelccaya Ice Cap and Qori Kalis Glacier in Peru, Zongo, Chacaltaya and Charquini glaciers in Bolivia, the Aconcagua River Basin in the central Chilean Andes, and the Northern Patagonian and Southern Patagonian ice fields. Retreat of glaciers in New Zealand and Antarctica is also well documented.

Many subantarctic glaciers are also in retreat. Mass balance is significantly negative on many glaciers on Kergeulen Island, Heard Island, South Georgia and Bouvet Island.

=== Glaciers of Heard Island ===
Heard Island is a heavily glacierized, subantarctic volcanic island located in the Southern Ocean, roughly 4000 kilometers southwest of Australia. 80% of the island is covered in ice, with glaciers descending from 2400 meters to sea level. Due to the steep topography of Heard Island, most of its glaciers are relatively thin (averaging only about 55 meters in depth). The presence of glaciers on Heard Island provides an excellent opportunity to measure the rate of glacial retreat as an indicator of climate change.

Available records show no apparent change in glacier mass balance between 1874 and 1929. Between 1949 and 1954, marked changes were observed to have occurred in the ice formations above 5,000 feet (1,500 m) on the southwestern slopes of Big Ben, possibly as a result of volcanic activity. By 1963, major recession was obvious below 2,000 feet (610 m) on almost all glaciers, and minor recession was evident as high as 5,000 feet (1,500 m).

Retreat of glacier fronts across Heard Island is evident when comparing aerial photographs taken in December 1947 with those taken on a return visit in early 1980. Retreat of Heard Island glaciers is most dramatic on the eastern section of the island, where the termini of former tidewater glaciers are now located inland. Glaciers on the northern and western coasts have narrowed significantly, while the area of glaciers and ice caps on Laurens Peninsula have shrunk by 30% – 65%.

During the time period between 1947 and 1988, the total area of Heard Island's glaciers decreased by 11%, from 288 km^{2} (roughly 79% of the total area of Heard Island) to only 257 km^{2}. A visit to the island in the spring of 2000 found that the Stephenson, Brown and Baudissin glaciers, among others, had retreated even further. The terminus of Brown Glacier has retreated approximately 1.1 kilometres since 1950. The total ice-covered area of Brown Glacier is estimated to have decreased by roughly 29% between 1947 and 2004. This degree of loss of glacier mass is consistent with the measured increase in temperature of +0.9 °C over that time span.

The coastal ice cliffs of Brown Glacier and Stephenson Glacier, which in 1954 were over 50 feet (15 m) high, had disappeared by 1963 when the glaciers terminated as much as 100 yards (91 m) inland. Baudissin Glacier on the north coast has lost at least 100 vertical feet (30 vertical m), and Vahsel Glacier on the west coast has lost at least 200 vertical feet (61 vertical m). Winston Glacier, which retreated approximately one mile (1.6 km) between 1947 and 1963, appears to be a very sensitive indicator of glacier change on the island. The young moraines flanking Winston Lagoon show that Winston Glacier has lost at least 300 vertical feet (91 vertical m) of ice within a recent time period.

The glaciers of Laurens Peninsula, whose maximum elevation is only 500 m above sea level, are smaller and shorter than most of the other Heard Island glaciers, and therefore much more sensitive to temperature effects. Accordingly, their total area has decreased by over 30 percent. Jacka Glacier on the east coast of Laurens Peninsula has also demonstrated marked recession since 1955. In the early 1950s, Jacka Glacier had receded only slightly from its position in the late 1920s, but by 1997 it had receded about 700 m back from the coastline.

Possible causes of glacier recession on Heard Island include:

1. Volcanic activity
2. Southward movement of the Antarctic Convergence: such a movement conceivably might cause glacier retreat through a rise in sea and air temperatures
3. Climatic change

The Australian Antarctic Division conducted an expedition to Heard Island during the austral summer of 2003–04. A small team of scientists spent two months on the island, conducting studies on avian and terrestrial biology and glaciology. Glaciologists conducted further research on the Brown Glacier, in an effort to determine whether glacial retreat is rapid or punctuated. Using a portable echo sounder, the team took measurements of the volume of the glacier. Monitoring of climatic conditions continued, with an emphasis on the impact of Foehn winds on glacier mass balance. Based on the findings of that expedition, the rate of loss of glacier ice on Heard Island appears to be accelerating. Between 2000 and 2003, repeat GPS surface surveys revealed that the rate of loss of ice in both the ablation zone and the accumulation zone of Brown Glacier was more than double average rate measured from 1947 to 2003. The increase in the rate of ice loss suggests that the glaciers of Heard Island are reacting to ongoing climate change, rather than approaching dynamic equilibrium. The retreat of Heard Island's glaciers is expected to continue for the foreseeable future.

== See also ==
- Extreme points of Antarctica
- List of Antarctic and subantarctic islands
- List of glaciers
- Subarctic
- Subarctic climate
