= Geography of Heard Island and McDonald Islands =

Heard Island and McDonald Islands
Nickname: HIMI
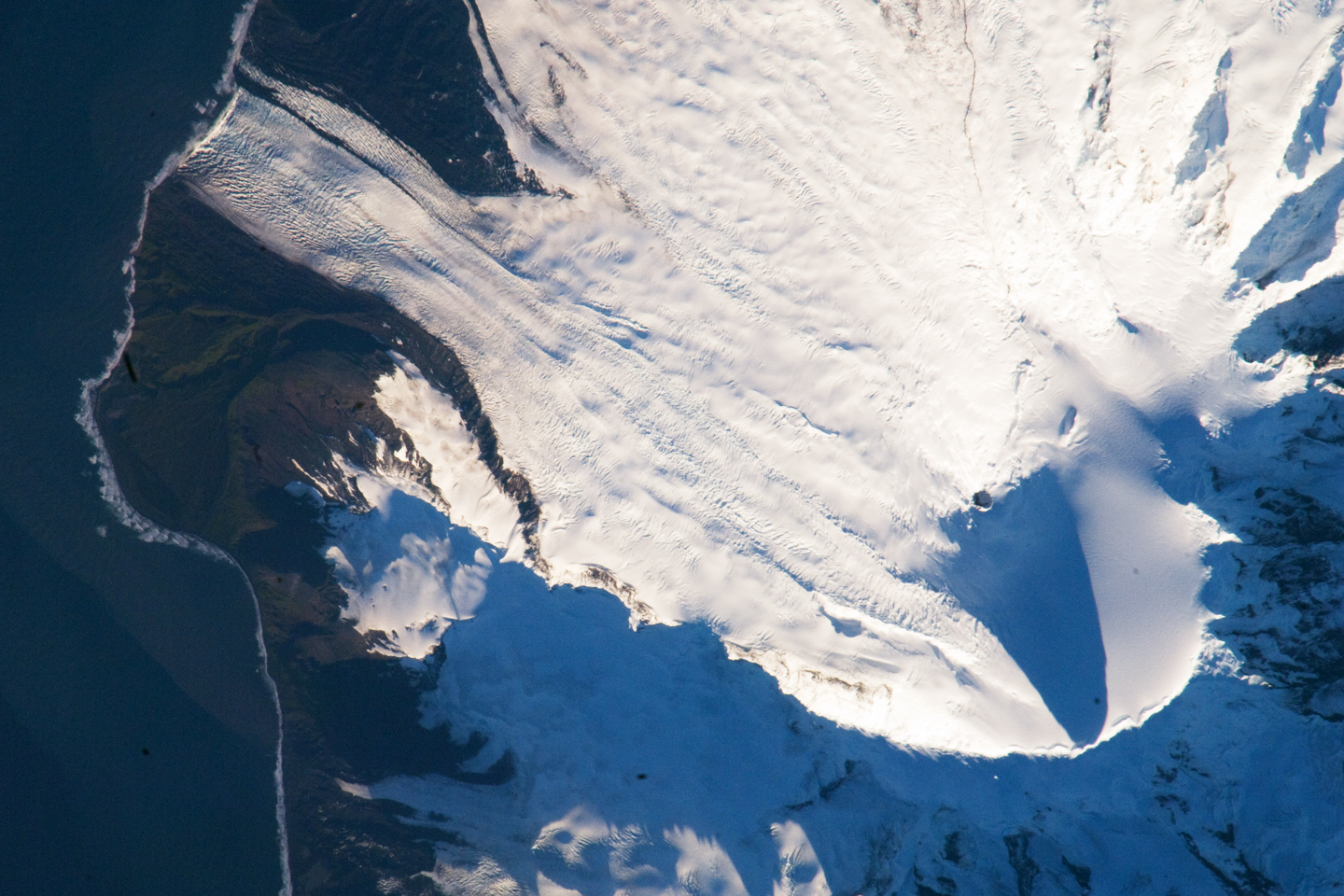
- Satellite image of the southern tip of Heard Island. Cape Arkona is seen on the left side of the image, with Lied Glacier just above and Gotley Glacier just below. Big Ben Volcano and Mawson Peak are seen at the lower right side of the image.

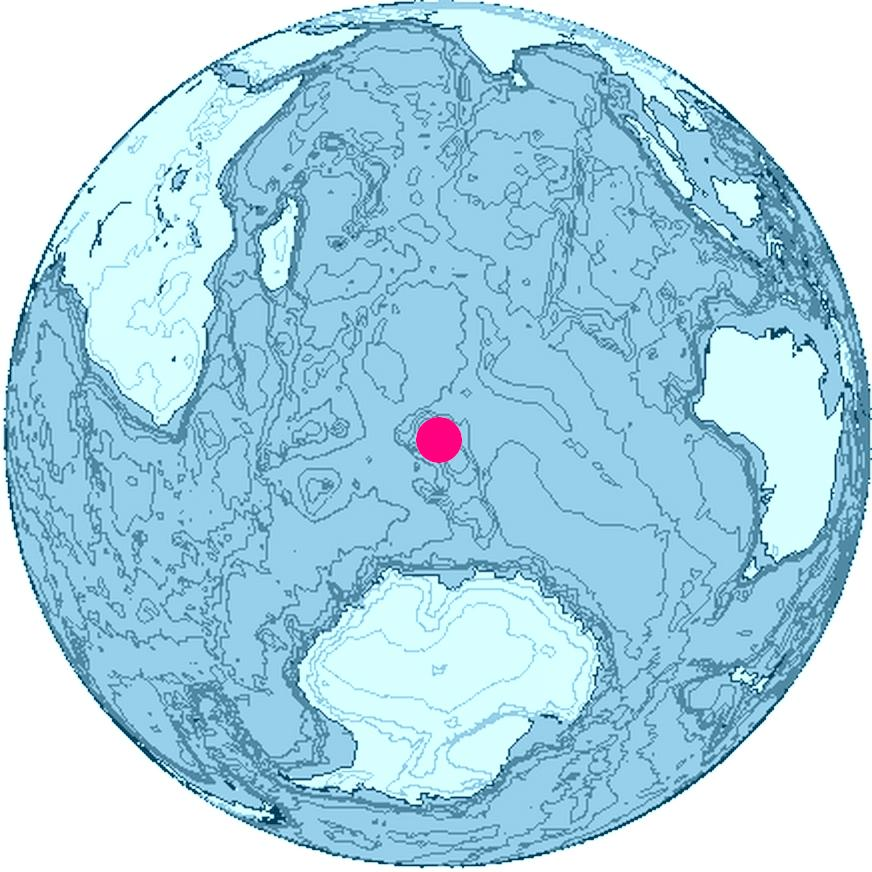
- Location of Heard and McDonald Islands

Geography
- Location: Indian Ocean
- Coordinates: 53°06′00″S 73°31′00″E
- Archipelago: Heard Island and McDonald Islands
- Total islands: 5
- Major islands: 2
- Area: 368 km^{2} (142 sq mi)
- Highest elevation: 2,745 m (9006 ft)
- Highest point: Mawson Peak

Administration
- Australia

Demographics
- Population: 0 (1 January 2011)
- Pop. density: 0/km^{2} (0/sq mi)
- Ethnic groups: 0

UNESCO World Heritage Site
- Official name: Heard Island and McDonald Islands
- Type: Natural
- Criteria: viii, ix
- Designated: 1997 (21st session)
- Reference no.: 577
- Region: Asia-Pacific

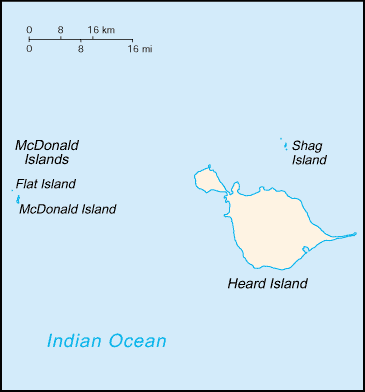
Map of Heard and McDonald Islands

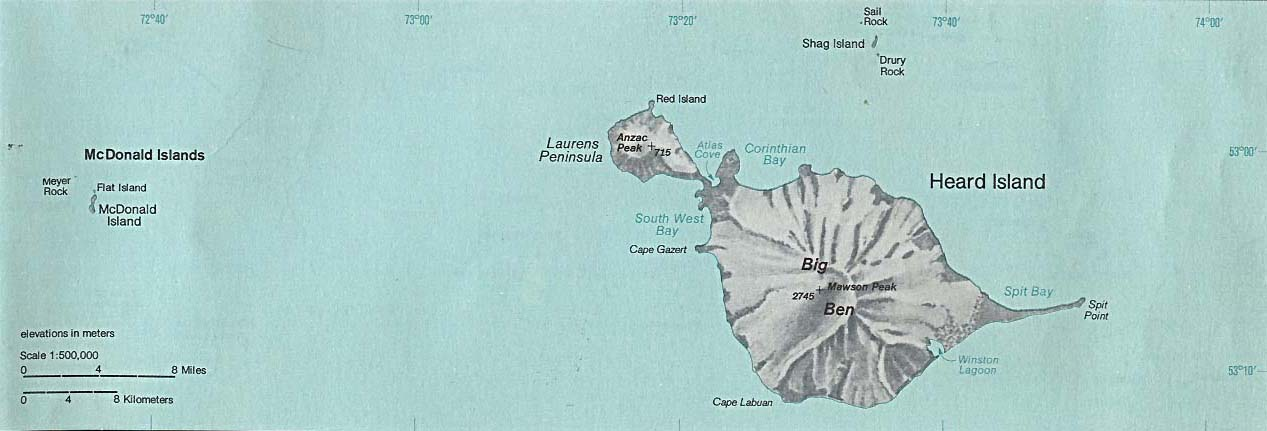
Map of the islands

The geography of the Heard Island and McDonald Islands (HIMI) refers to the geography of Heard Island and the McDonald Islands, one of the most remote places on earth. The islands belong to Australia and are located 4,000 kilometres (2,485.5 mi) southwest of the mainland in the Southern Ocean. These subantarctic islands were transferred to Australia by the United Kingdom in 1947. They lie between Madagascar and Antarctica.

HIMI has no ports or harbours; ships must anchor offshore. The coastline is 101.9 kilometres (63.3 mi), and a 12-nautical-mile (22 km; 14 mi) territorial sea and 200-nautical-mile (370 km; 230 mi) exclusive fishing zone is claimed. The HIMI marine zone, situated to the south of the Antarctic Convergence, is a biological hot spot for breeding and non-breeding seabirds and marine mammals such as penguins, petrels, elephant seals and fur seals. HIMI was inscribed as a UNESCO Heritage Site in 1999 under the title " "Territory of Heard Island and McDonald Islands".

== McDonald Islands ==
The McDonald Islands, of volcanic origin, are ice free. They are located 44 kilometres (27 mi) to the west of Heard Island at 53°02′20″S 72°36′04″E. The islands are small and rocky. In 1980, they consisted of McDonald Island (186 metres (610 ft) high), Flat Island (55 metres (180 ft) high) and Meyer Rock (170 metres (560 ft) high). They totalled approximately 2.5 square kilometres (1.0 sq mi) in area. Like Heard Island, they were surface exposures of the Kerguelen Plateau.

=== McDonald Island ===
McDonald Island is 1.13 square kilometres (0.4 sq mi) in size. Topographic features are the northern sloping plateau and the southern steep-sided hill named the Maxwell Hill. Both features have steep cliffs and merge into a common isthmus. The island's volcano, after being dormant for 75,000 years, became active in 1992 and has erupted several times since then. As a result of volcanic activity since the 1980s, the size of the island doubled and the height rose by 100 metres (330 ft). The island's area is now reported as 2.45 square kilometres (0.9 sq mi) and the highest summit is at least 230 metres (750 ft) high. The most recent eruption is thought to have been on 10 August 2005. Currently there is on-going regeneration of vegetation. Volcanic activity has generated basaltic lava and tuffaceous material with no soil cover.

== Heard Island ==
Heard Island is by far the largest of the group. It is a 368-square-kilometre (142 sq mi) bleak and mountainous island located at 53°06′00″S 73°31′00″E. Its mountains are covered in glaciers; the island is 80% covered with ice. The glaciation of the island from its highest point right up to the sea consists of 150 metres (492 ft) thick ice with ice cliffs along most of the coastline. It is dominated by Mawson Peak, a 2,745-metre (9,006 ft) high complex volcano which forms part of the Big Ben massif. A July 2000 satellite image by the University of Hawaii showed an active 2-kilometre (1.2 mi) long and 50–90-metre or 164–295-foot wide lava flow trending southwest from the summit. Mawson Peak is one of only two active volcanoes in the Australian territory, the other being on McDonald Island. It is also one of the highest Australian mountains, surpassed only by peaks in the Australian Antarctic Territory. The island is 40 kilometres (25 mi) in length at a point between the western edge of the Laurens Peninsula and the easternmost point of Elephant Spit. It is 20 kilometres (12 mi) wide at a point between Saddle Point on the north coast and the Long Beach on the south coast. It has two circular volcanic cones, Big Ben and Mt Dixon, 18–19-kilometre (11–12 mi) apart. Volcanic activity on the island has been noted since the mid-1980s, particularly on the southern part of the island which has resulted in the island's shape undergoing change and all wildlife disappearing; it is also reported that the size of the island has doubled and its height increased.

A long thin sand and gravel spit named "Elephant Spit" extends for about 10 kilometres (6 mi) to the Southern Ocean from the eastern end of the island. From Big Ben, rock buttresses of exposed rock descending in a radial pattern have been created due to erosion of the volcanic formations. Glaciers have carried the eroded sediment to the downstream end of the island and formed the low land of the Nullarbor (gravel isthmus) between the two volcanoes, and further to the east in the Elephant Spit. The end of this spit is called "Spit Point", and the bay to the north is named "Spit Bay". To the southwest of this spit on the southeast coast of the island is the Winston Lagoon. Cape Gazert, on the northwestern coast of the island, is just to the south of South West Bay, a bay which lies between Cape Gazert and the peninsula on the northwestern tip of Heard Island, the Laurens Peninsula. This peninsula contains the Anzac peak at 715 metres (2,346 ft), with Red Island on the very northern tip of the island and peninsula. Immediately to the east of the peninsula along the northern coast is Atlas Cove, a small peninsula in turn separates it from Corinthian Bay, further to the east.

=== Islets and rocks ===
There is a small group of islets and rocks about 10 kilometres (6 mi) northeast of the northern coast of Heard Island, consisting of Shag Islet, Sail Rock, Drury Rock, and Black Rock. They total about 1.1 square kilometres (0.4 sq mi) in area. Morgan Island is 2 kilometres (1 mi) east of Cape Bidlingmaier on Heard Island.

=== Glaciers ===
The Heard Island glaciers covered 79 percent of Heard Island in 1947 at 288 square kilometres or 111 square miles. By 1988, this had decreased by 11 percent to 257 square kilometres or 99 square miles. The glaciers fall under the Antarctic Environmental Gradient, which spans 30 degrees of latitude and includes a range of macro-climatic zones from cool temperate islands to the frigid and arid Antarctic continent. Glaciers extend from 2,745 metres or 9,010 feet to sea level, with ice up to 150 metres or 490 feet deep. The glaciers can appear fast-flowing due to the steep slope and high precipitation, and are particularly sensitive to climatic fluctuations. Measurements between 1947 and 1980 show that glacial retreat, particularly on the eastern flanks, is correlated with changes in weather patterns.

A 29 percent reduction in area of the Brown Glacier from 1947 to 2003 was observed. The volcano Big Ben, from which all the glaciers drain, has shown no sign of changing geothermal output to cause the melting; a 1 °C or 1.8 °F warming has occurred over the same time period. Glaciologists continue to study the Brown Glacier, detailing surveys of the glacier's snout and surface, which determine if glacial retreat is rapid or punctuated. Measurements on the mass balance of the glacier, as well as more detailed ice thickness measurements using a portable radar echo sounder, were undertaken. Monitoring of climatic conditions continues, with emphasis on the impact of Foehn winds on glacier mass balance.

Repairs were made to an automatic weather station established in November 2000. An expedition by scientists from the Australian Antarctic Division visited the volcanic island in 2009, observing glaciers that had retreated 50 metres (160 ft) in three years. Glaciologist Dr. Ian Allison states that the latest aerial surveys, in 2009, showed continuous rapid melt.

=== Winston Lagoon ===
Winston Lagoon is a lagoon indenting the southeast coast of Heard Island in the southern Indian Ocean, about 1 nautical mile (1.9 km) northeast of Cape Lockyer. The feature is roughly portrayed on an American sealer chart of the 1860 period. It was sighted from the air by Lieutenant Malcolm Smith, RAAF, pilot of the ANARE (Australian National Antarctic Research Expeditions) seaplane that made the first reconnaissance flight over the island in 1948. Lieutenant Smith proposed that it be named Lake Winston after his wife. In view of his death in an aircraft accident shortly afterward, this proposal was adopted by Australian Antarctic Names and Medals Committee (ANCA) with only a change of generic term.

Glaciers	Date of Change	Changes
Baudissin	1955-	Continuous marked recession
Vahsel	1955-	Continuous marked recession. Loss of at least 200 vertical feet of ice, with horizontal retreat as indicated by terminal moraines.
Abbotsmith	1947-	Relatively little change
Gotley	1947-	Relatively little change
Winston	1947-1963	Loss of about 300 feet or 90 metres in thickness as indicated by young moraines flanking the Winston Lagoon; Retreated 1 mile or 1.6 kilometres
Stephenson	1947-1963	50 feet or 15 metres of coastal ice cliff disappeared and terminated 100 yards or 90 metres inland
Brown	1947–1963; 2008	Similar to the Stephenson Glacier. 50 feet or 15 metres of coastal ice cliff disappeared and terminated 100 yards or 90 metres inland 29 percent reduction in area
Compton	1947-1986	Retreated 1,600 metres or 5,250 feet
Jacka	1955-	Continuous marked recession

== Climate ==
The islands have an Antarctic climate, tempered by their maritime setting. The weather is marked by low seasonal and daily temperature ranges, persistent and generally low cloud cover, frequent precipitation and strong winds. Snowfall occurs throughout the year. At Atlas Cove (at the northwestern end of Heard Island) the monthly average temperatures reported lie in the range from 0.0 °C (32.0 °F) to 4.2 °C (39.6 °F). The average daily variation of temperature is from 3.7 °C (38.7 °F) to 5.2 °C (41.4 °F) in summer and −0.8 °C (30.6 °F) to 0.3 °C (32.5 °F) in winter. The winds are predominantly westerly and persistently strong. At Atlas Cove, monthly average wind speeds range between around 26 to 33.5 km/h (16.2 to 20.8 mph). Gusts in excess of 180 km/h (110 mph) have been recorded. Annual precipitation at sea level on Heard Island is in the order of 1,300 to 1,900 mm (51.2 to 74.8 in); rain or snow falls on about 3 out of 4 days. The Relative Humidity also remains high at more than 80% through most of the year and this condition coupled with mountainous terrain results in high cloud cover "and often-spectacular cloud formulations, such as cap, lenticular and rotor (collectively wave clouds) commonly observed over and downwind of Big Ben and to a lesser extent Laurens Peninsula."

Meteorological records at Heard Island are incomplete, but there is evidence that the local climate is changing. Observations at Atlas Cove indicate an increase in average annual air temperature of almost 1 °C between the periods 1948-1954 and 1997–2001. This is reported to have caused glacial retreat and as result lagoons and freshwater lakes are getting formed, and flora and fauna have emerged in the new land.

== Geology ==
The geological formations recorded in HMII consist of deposits of limestone and are of volcanic origin (karst and volcanic features). The base rock formation in Heard Island is marine geology formation of middle Eocene to early Oligocene limestones; the volcanic eruptions overlie these formations.

== Conservation ==
HIMI are listed in the Register of the National Estate since 1983 under the Australia Heritage Commission Act 1975. It was inscribed on the UNESCO World Heritage List in 1997. The inscribed area is 658,903 ha (which includes both terrestrial and marine land) and under Criteria: (viii)and (ix) with the title "Territory of Heard Island and McDonald Islands", stating that it will "‘open a window into the earth’, thus providing the opportunity to observe ongoing geomorphic processes and glacial dynamics. The distinctive conservation value of Heard and McDonald – one of the world's rare pristine island ecosystems – lies in the complete absence of alien plants and animals, as well as human impact."
