= Sail Rock (disambiguation) =

Sail Rock is a free-standing monolith rock in Russia.

Sail Rock may also refer to:

- Sail Rock (Antarctica)
- Sail Rock (South Shetland Islands)
- Sail Rock (Taiwan), a rock in Pingtung County, Taiwan
- Fatumiala or Sail Rock, an island in Vanuatu
- Sail Rock, the easternmost point of the contiguous United States located off the shore of Maine
- Sail Rock Island in Bream Bay, an island near North Island in New Zealand

== See also ==
- Sailing stones, rocks that move in long tracks along a smooth valley floor without human or animal intervention
