= List of glaciers of Bouvet Island =

Location of Bouvet Island (circled in red)

Following is a list of glaciers of Bouvet Island in Antarctica. This list may not reflect recently named glaciers in Bouvet Island.

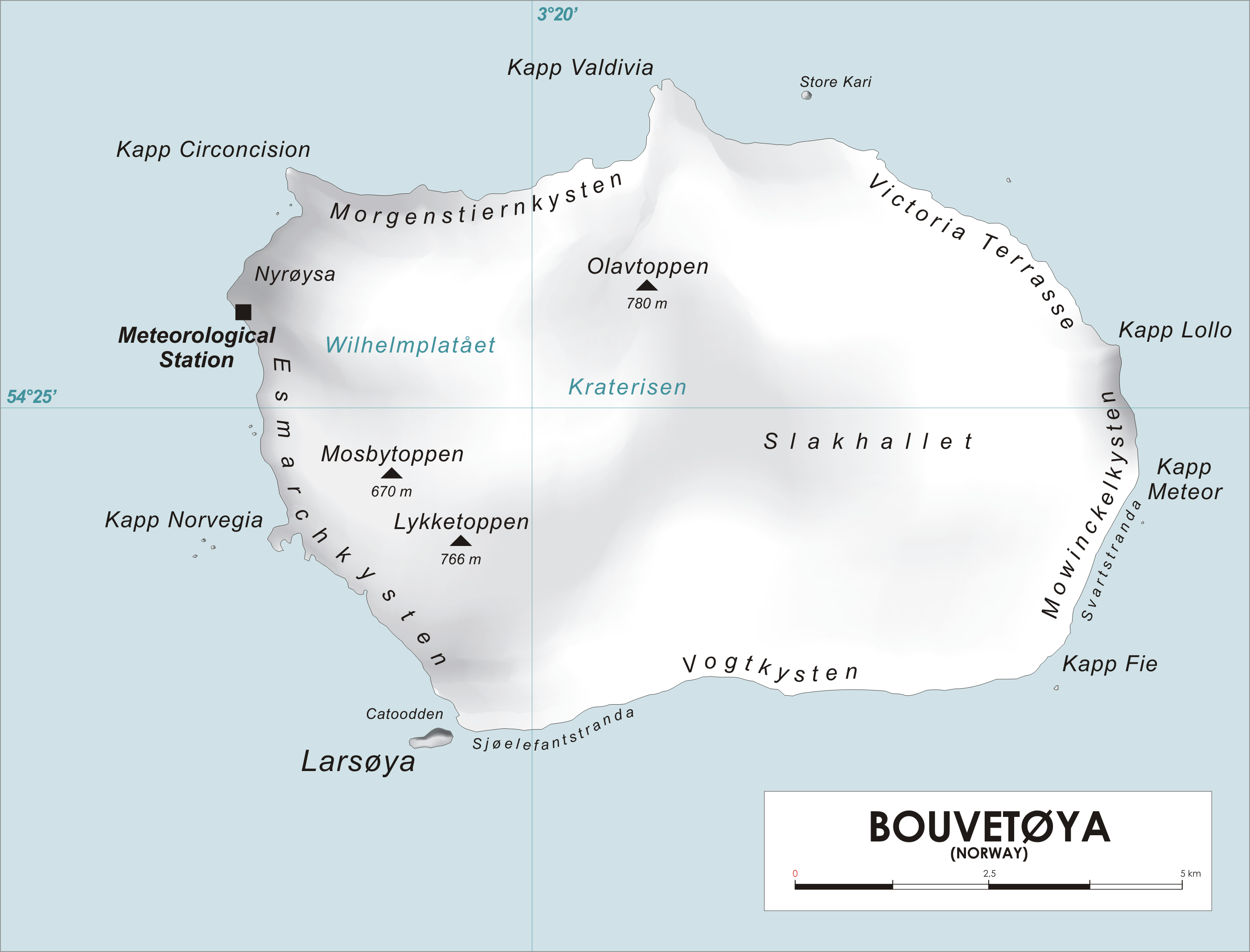
Map of Bouvetøya

== Christensen Glacier ==
54.4481°S 3.3525°E. (Note: The coordinates 54.4481°S 3.3525°E are derived from Google Maps. Alberts (1995) gives 54°28′S 3°24′E, which is a point in the sea some distance south of the island.) A glacier which flows to the south coast of Bouvetøya, 1 nautical mile (1.9 km; 1.2 mi) east of Cato Point. First charted in 1898 by a German expedition under Karl Chun. Recharted in December 1927 by a Norwegian expedition under Capt. Harald Horntvedt. Named by Horntvedt after Lars Christensen, sponsor of the expedition. Not: Christensenbreen, Christensens Bre.

== Horntvedt Glacier ==
54°25′S 3°21′E. A small glacier flowing to the north coast of Bouvetøya immediately east of Cape Circoncision. First charted in 1898 by a German expedition under Karl Chun. Recharted in December 1927 by a Norwegian expedition which named it for Harald Horntvedt, captain of the expedition ship Norvegia. Not: Horntvedtbreen, Horntvedts Bre.

== Posadowsky Glacier ==
54°25′S 3°22′E. A glacier which flows to the north coast of Bouvetøya, 1 nautical mile (1.9 km; 1.2 mi) eastward of Cape Circoncision. First charted and named by a German expedition under Karl Chun which visited the island in the Valdivia in 1898. Count Arthur von Posadowsky-Wehner, Imperial Home Secretary, was instrumental in obtaining government sponsorship of the expedition. Not: Posadowskybreen, Posadowskys Bre.

== Sources ==
- Alberts, Fred G., ed. (1995), Geographic Names of the Antarctic (PDF) (2 ed.), United States Board on Geographic Names This article incorporates public domain material from websites or documents of the United States Board on Geographic Names.
