= Lied Glacier =

Body of ice on Heard Island

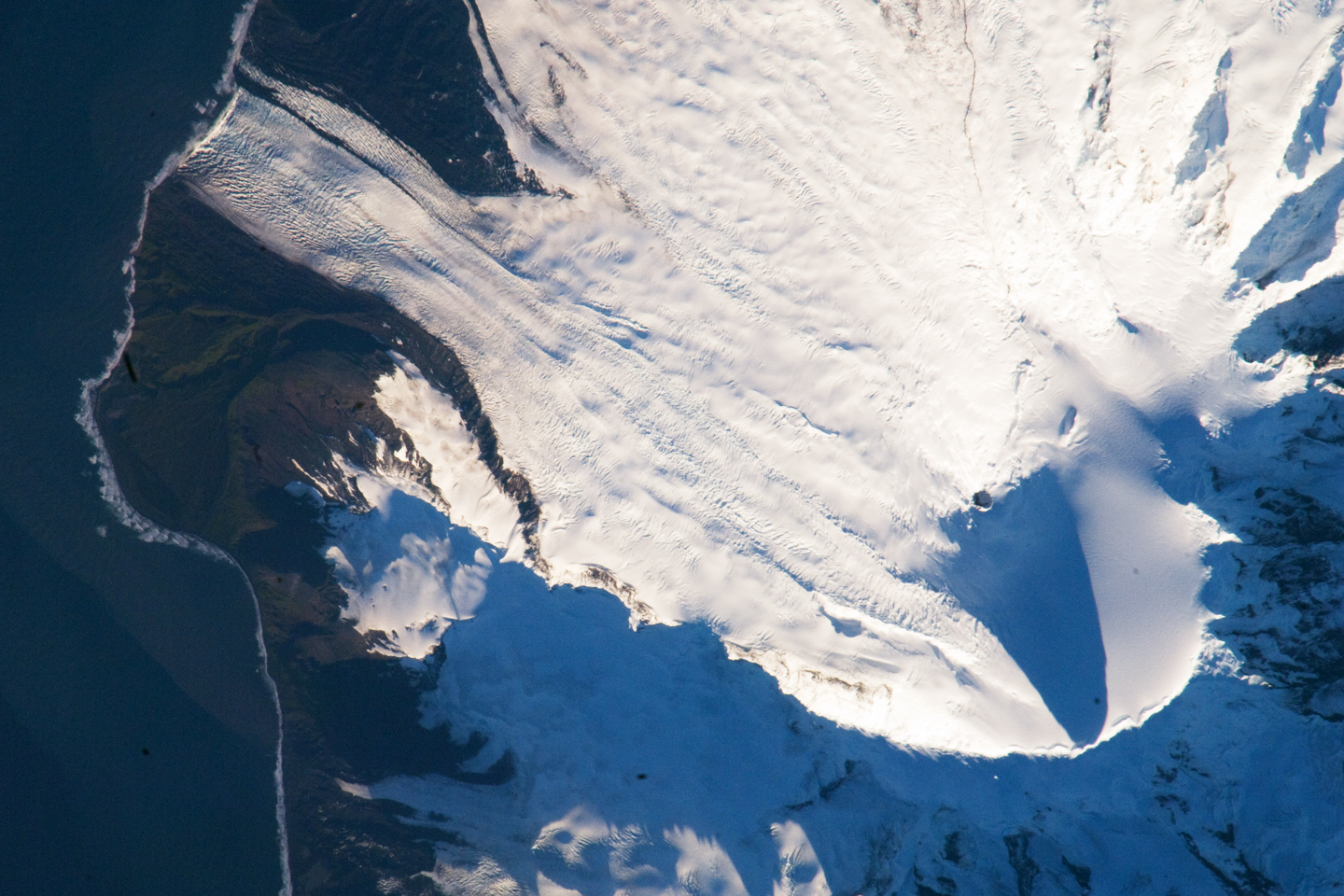
- Satellite image of the southern tip of Heard Island. Cape Arkona is seen on the left side of the image, with Lied Glacier just above and Gotley Glacier just below. Big Ben Volcano and Mawson Peak are seen at the lower right side of the image.

- Location within Indian Ocean
- Interactive map of Lied Glacier
- Type: cirque/tidewater
- Location: Heard Island; Territory of Heard Island and McDonald Islands; Australia
- Coordinates: 53°09′S 73°26′E
- Thickness: approx 55 metres (180 ft)
- Terminus: between Cape Arkona and Cape Pillar
- Status: Retreating

Lied Glacier is a glacier close north of Cape Arkona on the southwest side of Heard Island in the southern Indian Ocean. To the southeast of Lied Glacier is Gotley Glacier, whose terminus is located between Cape Arkona and Cape Labuan. Cape Arkona separates Lied Glacier from Gotley Glacier. To the north of Lied Glacier is Abbotsmith Glacier.

== Discovery and naming ==
Lied Glacier was surveyed by Australian National Antarctic Research Expeditions (ANARE) in 1948. It was named by the Antarctic Names Committee of Australia for N.T. Lied, a radio operator and weather observer with ANARE on Heard Island in the years 1951 and 1963, respectively.
