= Mount Dixon (Heard Island) =

Volcano on Heard Island

Mount Dixon (53°0′S 73°17′E) is a snow-covered stratovolcano, 705 metres (2,310 ft) high, standing 0.7 nautical miles (1.3 km) west of Anzac Peak on the Laurens Peninsula, Heard Island. The feature appears to have been roughly charted on an 1860 sketch map by Captain H.C. Chester, an American sealer operating in the area during this period. It was surveyed in 1948 by the Australian National Antarctic Research Expeditions (ANARE), and named by them for Lieutenant Commander George M. Dixon, RANVR, commanding officer of HMAS Labuan which landed and relieved the 1948 and 1949 ANARE parties.

The peak is 9 kilometres (10 mi) northwest of Big Ben. No activity has been observed on Mount Dixon; however, some lava flows that are vegetation-free suggest an eruption within the last few hundred years.
