= Gotley Glacier =

Glacier on Heard Island in the southern Indian Ocean

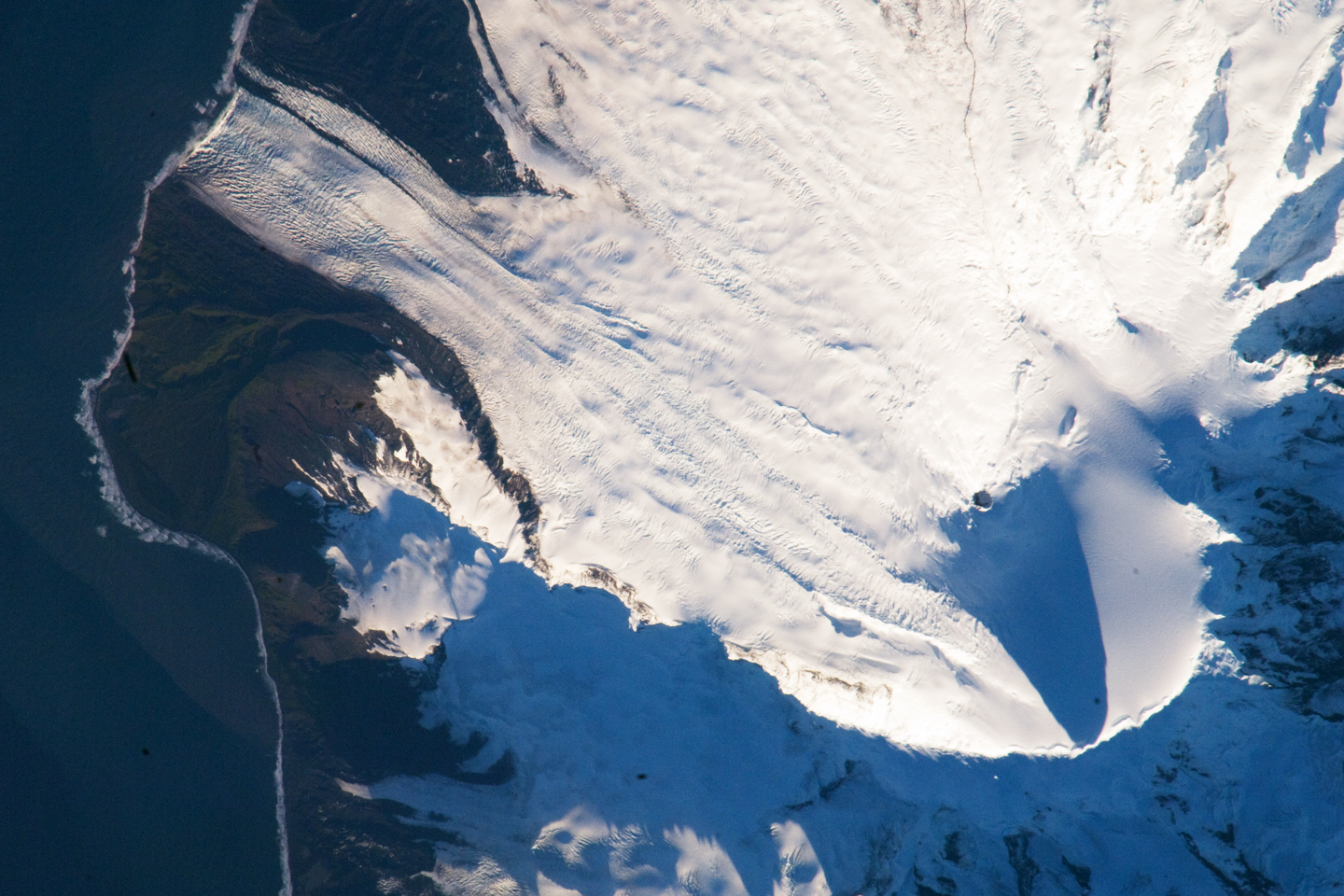
- Satellite image of the southern tip of Heard Island. Cape Arkona is seen on the left side of the image, with Lied Glacier just above and Gotley Glacier just below. Big Ben Volcano and Mawson Peak are seen at the lower right side of the image.

- Location within Indian Ocean
- Interactive map of Gotley Glacier
- Type: cirque/tidewater
- Location: Heard Island; Territory of Heard Island and McDonald Islands; Australia
- Coordinates: 53°10′S 73°27′E
- Area: 27 km^{2}
- Length: 7.3 nautical miles (13.2 km)
- Thickness: approximately 55 meters
- Terminus: between Cape Arkona and Cape Labuan
- Status: Retreating

Gotley Glacier is a well-defined glacier, 5 nautical miles (9 km) long, descending from the ice-covered slopes of the Big Ben massif to the southwest side of Heard Island in the southern Indian Ocean. Its terminus is located between Cape Arkona and Cape Labuan. To the east of Gotley Glacier is Deacock Glacier, whose terminus is located between Cape Labuan and Long Beach. To the northwest of Gotley Glacier is Lied Glacier, whose terminus is located between Cape Arkona and Cape Pillar. Cape Arkona separates Gotley Glacier from Lied Glacier.

== Discovery and naming ==
Gotley Glacier was surveyed in 1948 by the Australian National Antarctic Research Expeditions, and named by them for Aubrey V. Gotley, meteorologist and officer-in-charge of the party.
