= Warwick Deacock =

Warwick Deacock (1926–2017) was a British soldier, mountaineer and adventurer.

== Early life ==
Born in London, he joined the Royal Marines in 1943 and gained Commando Green Beret. Deacock left the Marines in 1947 and went on to do odd jobs to pay for sailing and climbing. In 1956, he joined the Special Air Service and served in Northern Malaya and Oman. He later resigned after realising the forces he fought in Oman were trained by the Central Intelligence Agency.

In 1959, Warwick Deacock migrated to Australia with his wife and daughter.

== Ascent of Big Ben ==
In 1963 Deacock went to Heard Island as a member of the Australian National Antarctic Research Expeditions. During the expedition, there was an attempt on climbing Big Ben to investigate glaciology, geology and volcanology of the unexplored area. Due to a prolonged blizzard and a lost food depot, the attempt was abandoned. One of the three members (Grahame Budd) had frostbitten hands but all survived. The three had lost their tent, sleeping bags and other equipment.

Back in Australia, Deacock drove around the country with his family working odd jobs. He decided to have another attempt at climbing Big Ben and in 1964 started fundraising for the attempt. In 8 months he raised nearly £86,000. Using this, Deacock and four others went back to Heard Island and in January 1965, were the first to summit Big Ben.

== Oral history ==
Deacock was interviewed in 1988 by Tim Bowden about the Australian Antarctic Division. The recording can be found at the National Library of Australia.

== Awards ==
- Royal Geographic Society J.P. Thompson Medal for Exploration in 1992
- Australian Geographic Society Adventurer of the Year Gold Medal in 1993
- Order of Australia for services to conservation and the environment in 1997
