= Deacock Glacier =

Glacier on Heard Island in the southern Indian Ocean

- Location of Heard Island and McDonald Islands on the globe

- Location within Indian Ocean
- Interactive map of Deacock Glacier
- Type: tidewater
- Location: Heard Island; Territory of Heard Island and McDonald Islands; Australia
- Coordinates: 53°11′S 73°31′E
- Thickness: approximately 55 meters
- Terminus: between Cape Labuan and Long Beach
- Status: Retreating

Deacock Glacier (53°11′S 73°31′E) is a glacier close west of Lavett Bluff on the south side of Heard Island in the southern Indian Ocean. Its terminus is between Cape Labuan and Long Beach. To the east of Deacock Glacier is Fiftyone Glacier, whose terminus is located between Lavett Bluff and Lambeth Bluff. To the west of Deacock Glacier is Gotley Glacier, whose terminus is located between Cape Arkona and Cape Labuan.

== Discovery and naming ==
Surveyed by ANARE (Australian National Antarctic Research Expeditions), 1948–63. Named by Antarctic Names Committee of Australia (ANCA) for W. Deacock, a member of ANARE on Heard Island in 1963.
