= HMAS Labuan (L3501) =

1944 LST(3)-class tank landing ship

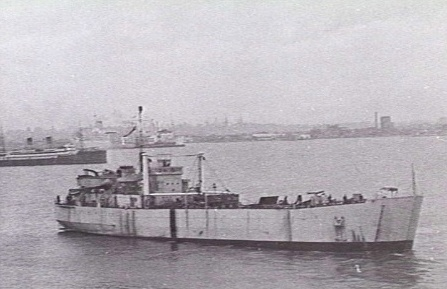
- HMAS Labuan leaving Williamstown, Victoria for Macquarie Island in May 1949

History

Australia
- Name: LST 3501
- Builder: Canadian Vickers
- Launched: 31 August 1944
- Renamed: HMAS Labuan (16 December 1948)
- Launched: 31 August 1944
- Decommissioned: 28 September 1951
- Fate: Sold for disposal on 9 November 1955

General characteristics
- Class & type: Landing Ship Tank Mark 3
- Displacement: 2,140 tonnes (2,110 long tons; 2,360 short tons) light; 3,117 tonnes (3,068 long tons; 3,436 short tons) beaching
- Length: 345 ft (105 m) overall
- Beam: 55 ft 3 in (16.84 m)
- Draught: 13 ft 1 in (3.99 m)
- Propulsion: Triple expansion engine, 5,500 hp (4,100 kW), two propellers
- Speed: 13 knots (24 km/h; 15 mph)
- Range: 10,000 nautical miles (19,000 km; 12,000 mi) at 10 knots (19 km/h; 12 mph)
- Capacity: 18 40-ton tanks, 27 trucks, and 7 LCMs
- Troops: 168 troops
- Complement: 104
- Armament: 10 × 20 mm Oerlikons (four twin, two single mounts)

HMAS Labuan (L3501) (formerly HMA LST 3501) was a Mark III Tank Landing Ship that served in the Royal Navy (as HMS LST 3501) during World War II, and with the Royal Australian Navy (RAN) from 1946 until 1951.

In RAN service, the landing ship was primarily used in support of the Australian National Antarctic Research Expedition (ANARE). The vessel transported ANARE personnel and equipment to and from Heard Island and Macquarie Island. While returning from Heard Island in 1951, Labuan broke down and had to be towed to the mainland. The ship was paid off, and disposed of in 1955.

== Design and construction ==
LST 3501 was built by Canadian Vickers at their shipyard in Montreal, Quebec, Canada. The vessel was launched on 31 August 1944. The Mark 3 LST had a light load displacement of 2,140 tonnes (2,110 long tons; 2,360 short tons), with a maximum beachable displacement of 3,117 tonnes (3,068 long tons; 3,436 short tons) beaching. They were 345 feet (105 m) in length overall, with a beam of 55 feet 3 inches (16.84 m), and a maximum draught of 13 feet 1 inch (3.99 m) at the stern. Propulsion was provided by triple expansion engines, which delivered 5,500 horsepower (4,100 kW) to the two propellers. Maximum speed was 13 knots (24 km/h; 15 mph), with a range of 10,000 nautical miles (19,000 km; 12,000 mi) at 10 knots (19 km/h; 12 mph). The LCTs had a ship's company of 104, and a maximum load of 168 troops, 18 40-ton tanks, 27 trucks, and 7 Landing Craft Mechanized. In RAN service, LST 3501 was armed with ten 20 mm Oerlikons: four twin and two single mounts.

== Operational history ==
LST 3501 operated with the Royal Navy during World War II.

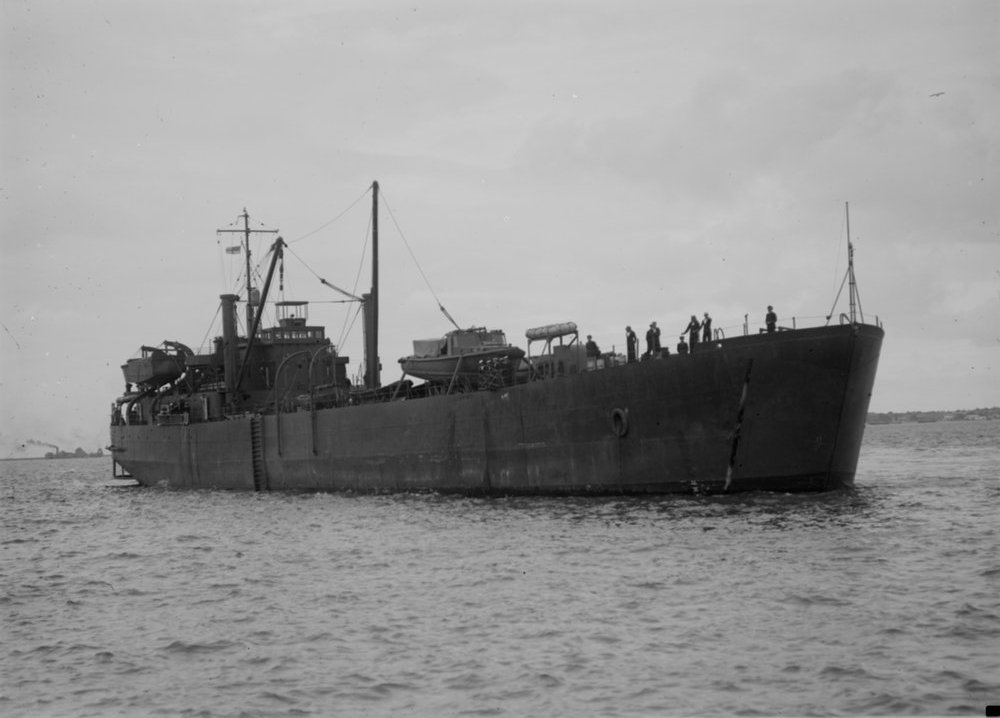
HMAS LST 3501 in 1947

In 1946, LST 3501 and five other Mark 3 LSTs were loaned to the RAN. They were all commissioned into RAN service on 1 July 1946. In 1947, LST 3501 was selected to assist in the establishment of, then provide logistic support to, the Australian National Antarctic Research Expedition (ANARE) research facilities on Heard Island and Macquarie Island. The vessel was repainted yellow to assist with visual identification in Antarctic waters, and modified slightly to carry a Supermarine Walrus seaplane, which was launched by derrick. On 28 November 1947, LST 3501 departed from Fremantle with fourteen ANARE personnel and twelve months of supplies, arriving at Heard Island on 12 December and offloading the supplies and scientists. On 5 January, the Walrus was lost during foul weather, and was not replaced.

The ship returned to Melbourne, where more stores and a second group of 13 ANARE personnel were loaded before LST 3501 sailed to Macquarie Island on 28 February 1948, arriving seven days later. After unloading for the second time, the landing ship waited for the arrival of the research vessel HMAS Wyatt Earp in late March before returning to Australia.

LST 3501 was renamed HMAS Labuan on 16 December 1948, after the amphibious landings at Labuan. The 1948 ANARE expedition named Cape Labuan on Heard Island after the ship, and used names of officers and senior enlisted personnel for Lavett Bluff, Mount Dixon, Cape Lockyer, and Hayter Peak.

She returned to the islands on five occasions to deliver supplies and transfer personnel: Heard Island during January to March 1949, 1950, and 1951, and Macquarie Island in April 1949 and 1950.

== Decommissioning and fate ==
The landing ship was heavily damaged during the 1951 visit to Heard Island. Labuan attempted to sail home, but broke down completely en route. The vessel had to be towed back to Fremantle, arriving on 1 March.

Labuan paid off to reserve on 28 September 1951 and was sold for disposal on 9 November 1955.
