= Lavett Bluff =

Rock bluff on Heard Island in the southern Indian Ocean

Lavett Bluff (53°11′S 73°32′E) is a rock bluff between Deacock Glacier and Fiftyone Glacier on the south side of Heard Island in the southern Indian Ocean. It was surveyed in 1948 by an Australian National Antarctic Research Expedition (ANARE) and named "Cape Lavett" for Lieutenant John L. Lavett, Royal Australian Navy, one of the officers on HMAS Labuan, the relief ship for the expedition. Further ANARE exploration led to revision of the name in 1964 to Lavett Bluff.
