= Cato Point =

Headland in Bouvet Island

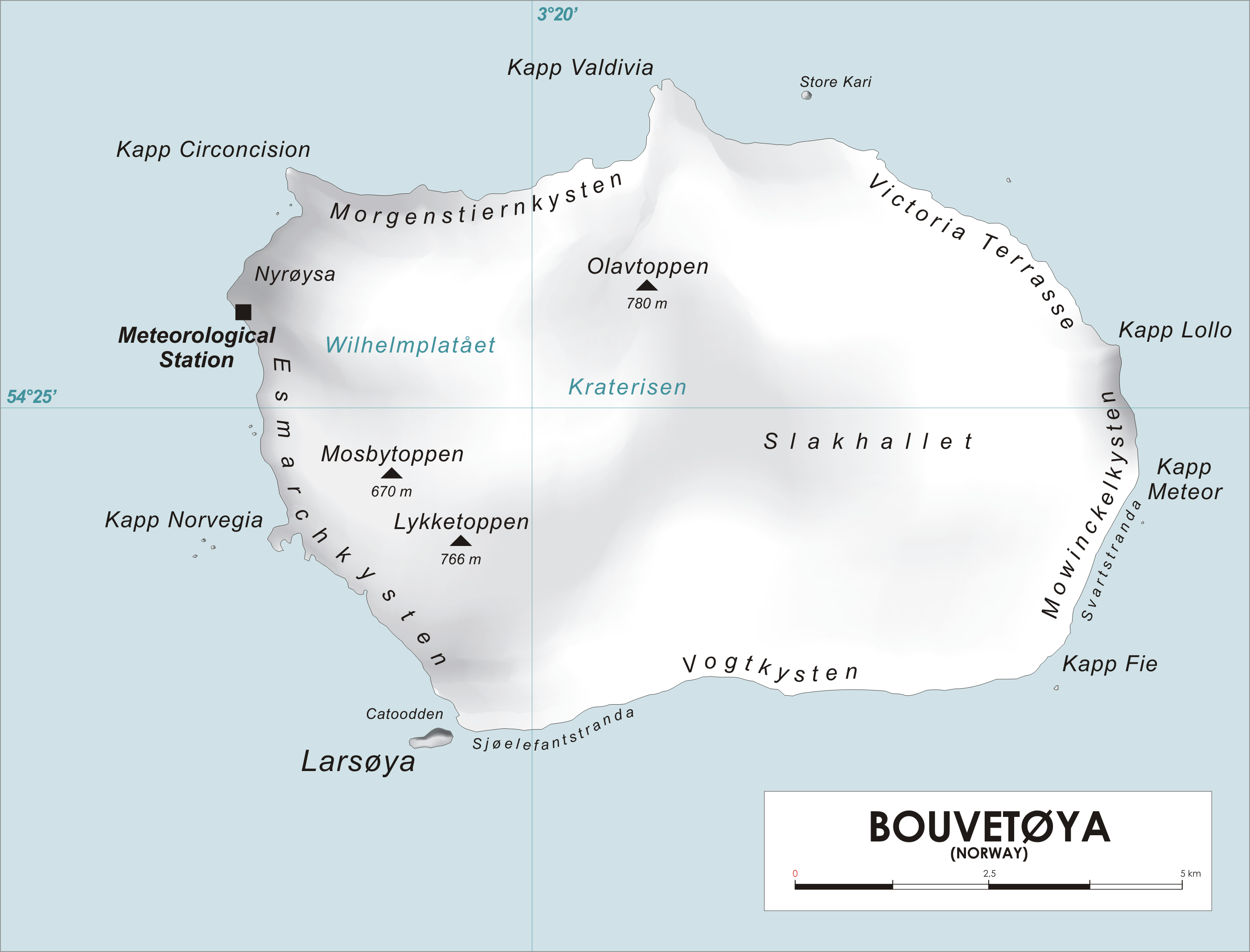
Map of Bouvetøya

Cato Point (54°28′S 3°22′E) is a headland forming the southwest extremity of Bouvet Island. It was first charted in 1898 by a German expedition under Carl Chun. The Norwegian expedition under Captain Harald Horntvedt made a landing here from the Norvegia in December 1927; they applied the name.
