= Sail Rock (Heard Island) =

Rock formation in Antarctica

Coordinates: 52°54′S 73°34′E

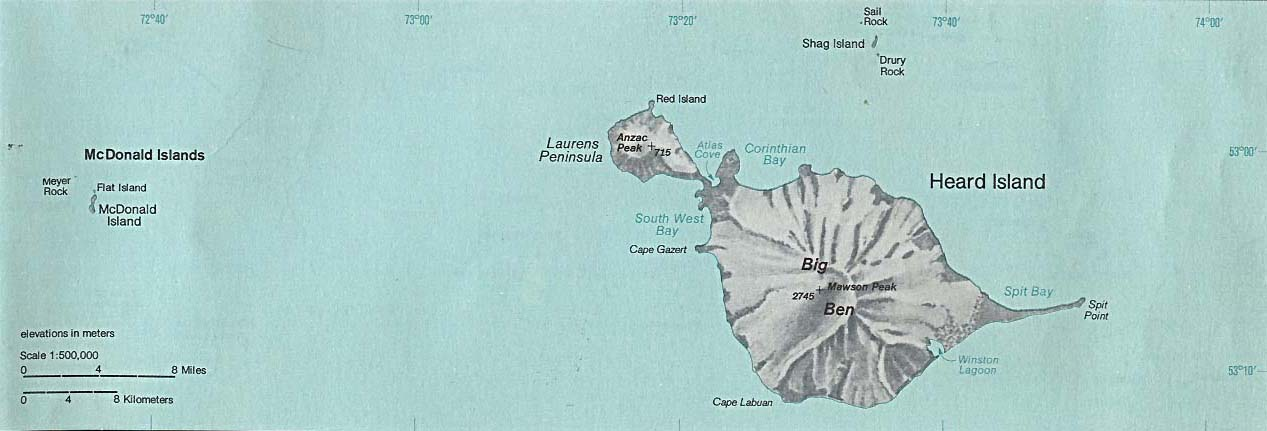
- Sail Rock is to the northwest of Shag Island
- Interactive map of Sail Rock

Geography
- Location: Southern Indian Ocean
- Archipelago: Heard Island and McDonald Islands

Administration
- Australia
- External territory: Heard Island and McDonald Islands

Demographics
- Population: 0

Sail Rock is a rock lying 1 nautical mile (1.9 km; 1.2 mi) northwest of Shag Island and 7 nautical miles (13 km; 8.1 mi) north of Heard Island. This rock, though positioned several miles too far westward, appears to have been first shown on an 1860 sketch map compiled by Captain H.C. Chester, American sealer operating in the area during this period. It was more accurately charted and named on an 1874 chart by the Challenger expedition.
