= Cape Labuan =

Cape on Heard Island, Antarctica

- Cape
- Location within Indian Ocean
- Coordinates: 53°11′S 73°28′E
- Location: Heard Island, Antarctica
- Etymology: HMAS Labuan

Cape Labuan (53°11′S 73°28′E) is a rocky point midway between Cape Arkona and Lavett Bluff, forming the southwest extremity of Heard Island. It was charted in 1948 by the Australian National Antarctic Research Expeditions and named after HMAS Labuan, a relief ship for the expedition.
