= Paget Glacier =

Glacier in Antarctica

- Location within South Georgia Island
- Location: South Georgia
- Coordinates: 54°24′S 36°28′W
- Length: 4 nmi (7 km; 5 mi)
- Width: 1 nmi (2 km; 1 mi)
- Thickness: unknown
- Terminus: Nordenskjöld Glacier
- Status: unknown

Paget Glacier (54°24′S 36°28′W) is a glacier in South Georgia, 4 miles (6 km) long and 1 mile (1.6 km) wide, which flows northeast from the north slopes of Mount Paget into the west side of Nordenskjold Glacier. The glacier was roughly surveyed in 1928–29 by a German expedition under Kohl-Larsen, and resurveyed in 1951–52 by the SGS. The name, which is derived from nearby Mount Paget, was given by the SGS in 1951–52.

== See also ==
- List of glaciers in the Antarctic
- Glaciology
