= Hindle Glacier =

Glacier in Antarctica

- Location within South Georgia Island
- Location: South Georgia
- Coordinates: 54°34′S 36°5′W
- Length: 6 nmi (11 km; 7 mi)
- Thickness: unknown
- Terminus: Royal Bay
- Status: unknown

Hindle Glacier (54°34′S 36°5′W) is a glacier 6 miles (10 km) long, flowing north from the vicinity of Mount Paterson into Royal Bay on the north coast of South Georgia. It was surveyed by the South Georgia Survey (SGS), 1951–52. The name "Bruce Glacier" was used unofficially by the British South Georgia Expedition, 1954–55, but a number of Antarctic features are named for Dr. William S. Bruce. The UK Antarctic Place-Names Committee recommended in 1957 that the glacier be named for Dr. Edward Hindle, a British zoologist who, as Honorary Secretary of the Royal Geographical Society, was of great assistance to the SGS expeditions.

== See also ==
- List of glaciers in the Antarctic
- Glaciology
