= Neumayer Glacier =

Glacier in Antarctica

- Location within South Georgia Island
- Location: South Georgia
- Coordinates: 54°15′S 36°41′W
- Length: 8 nmi (15 km; 9 mi)
- Width: 2 nmi (4 km; 2 mi)
- Thickness: unknown
- Terminus: Cumberland West Bay
- Status: unknown

Neumayer Glacier is a glacier, 8 nautical miles (15 km; 9.2 mi) long and 2 nautical miles (3.7 km; 2.3 mi) wide, which flows east along the north flank of the Allardyce Range to the west side of the head of Cumberland West Bay, South Georgia. It was charted by the Swedish Antarctic Expedition under Otto Nordenskiöld, 1901–1904, and named for Georg von Neumayer.

Between 2005 and 2009, the glacier retreated 1 kilometer (0.62 mi).

== See also ==
- List of glaciers in the Antarctic
- Glaciology

== Gallery ==
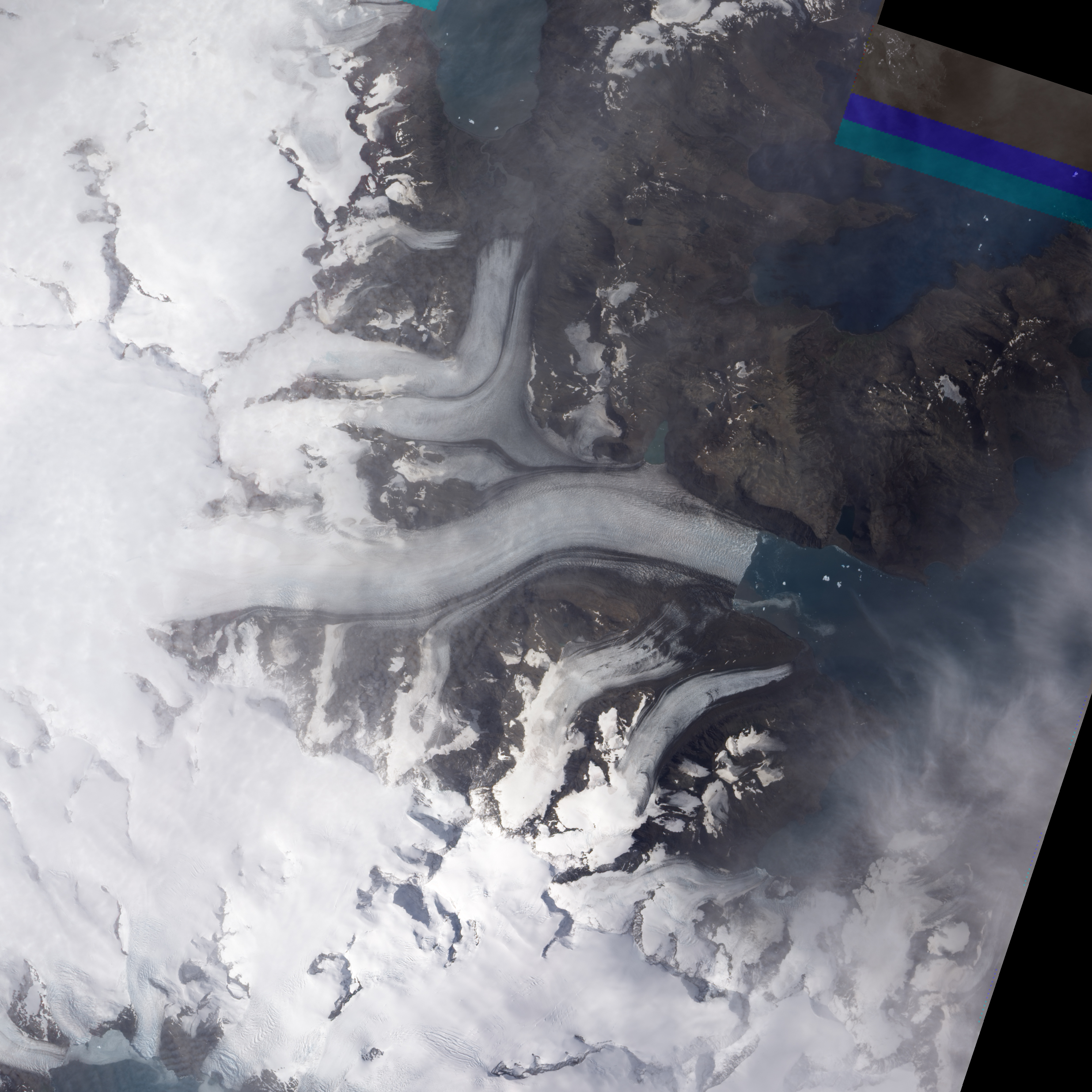
Neumayer Glacier in January 2005

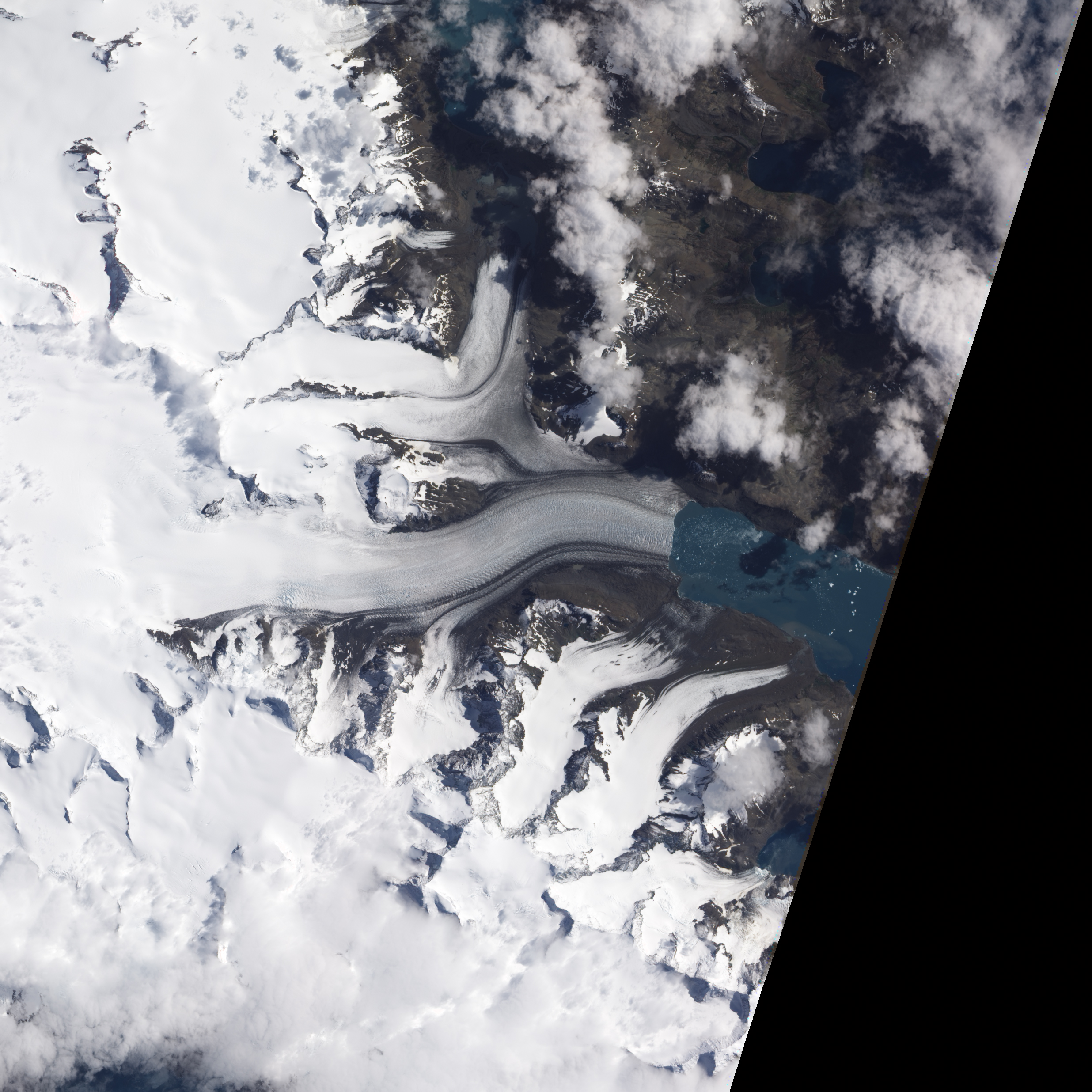
Neumayer Glacier in January 2009

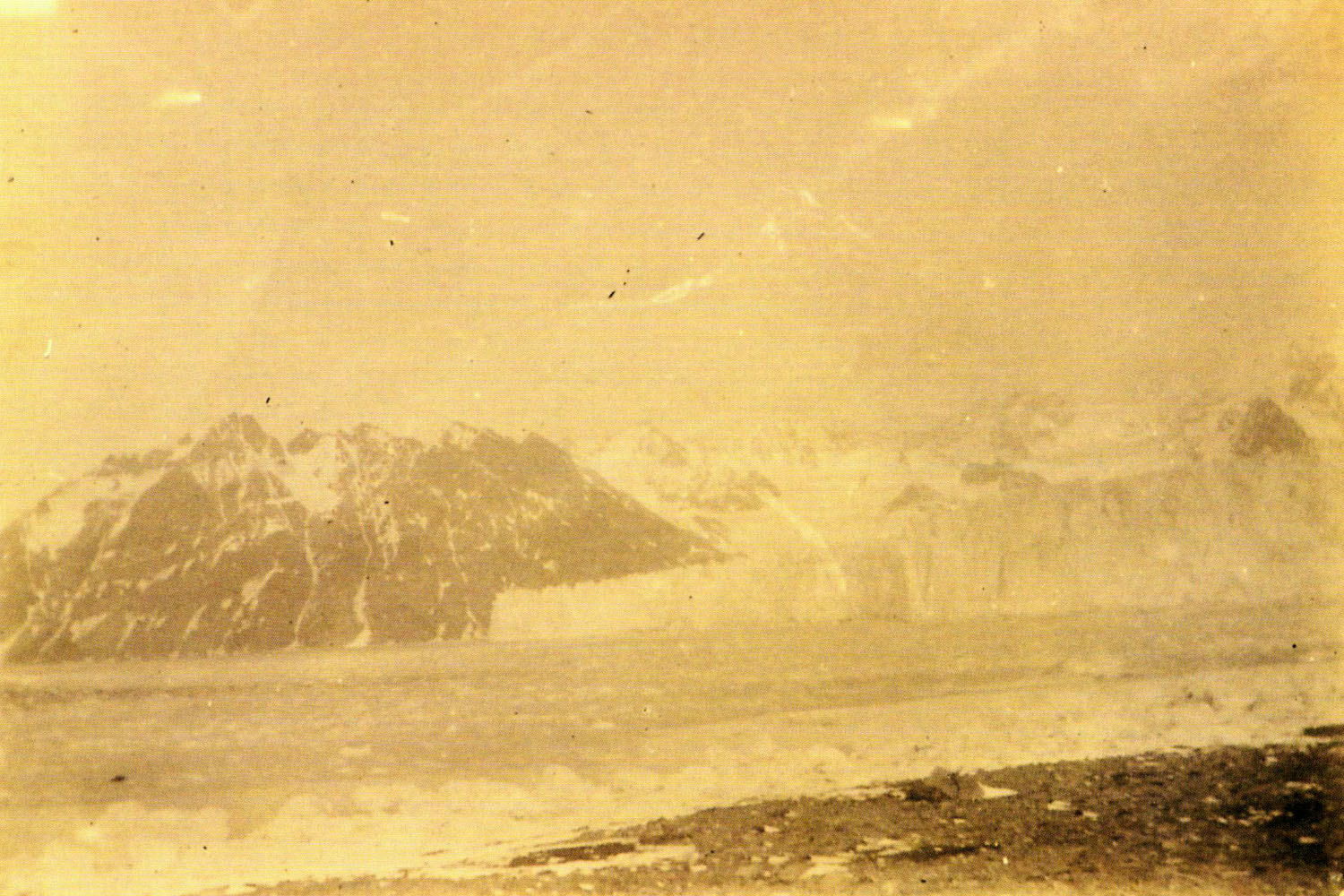
Neumayer Glacier, Cumberland West Bay, South Georgia, circa 1882

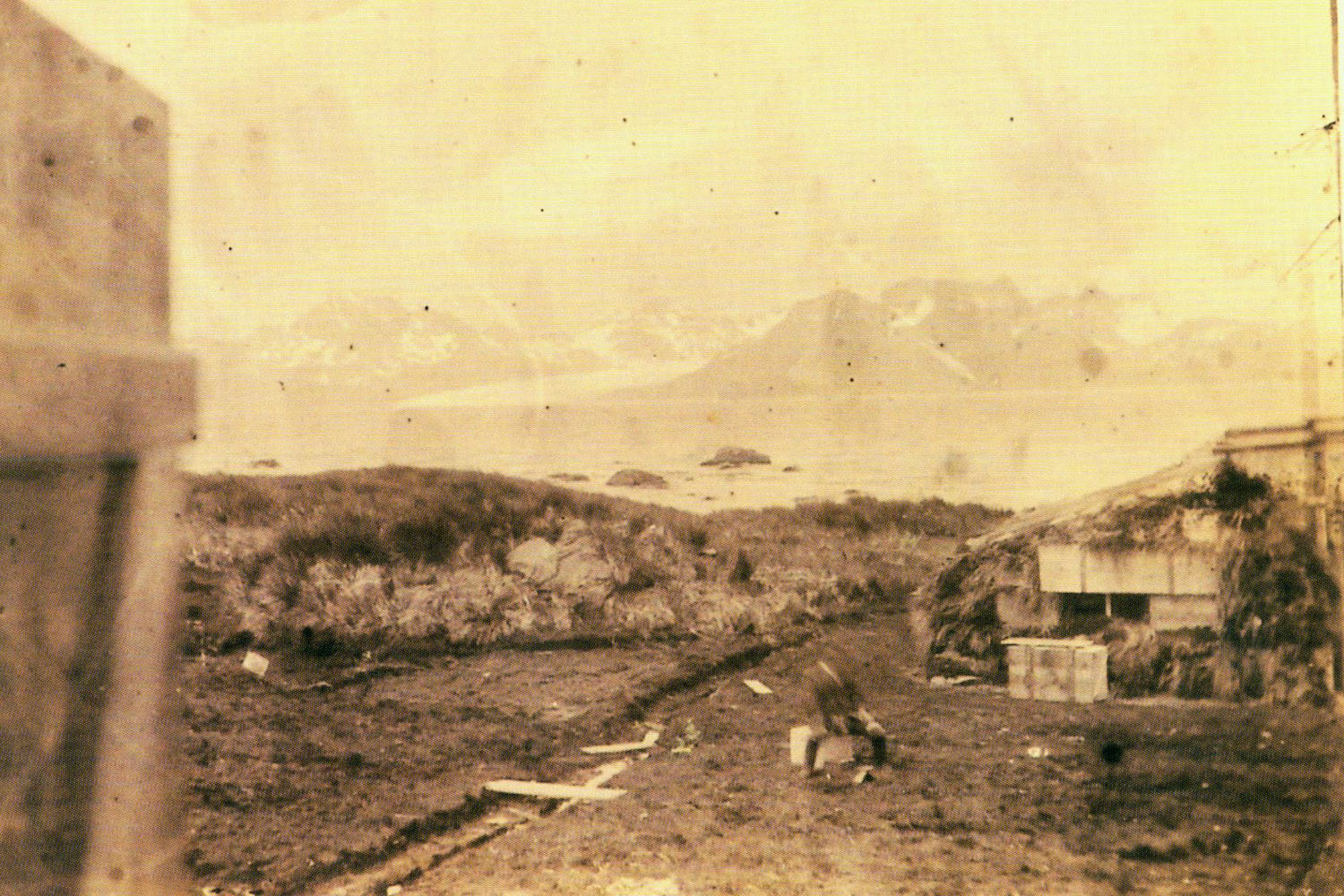
Neumayer Glacier, Cumberland West Bay, South Georgia, circa 1882
