= Mawson Peak =

Volcano on Heard Island

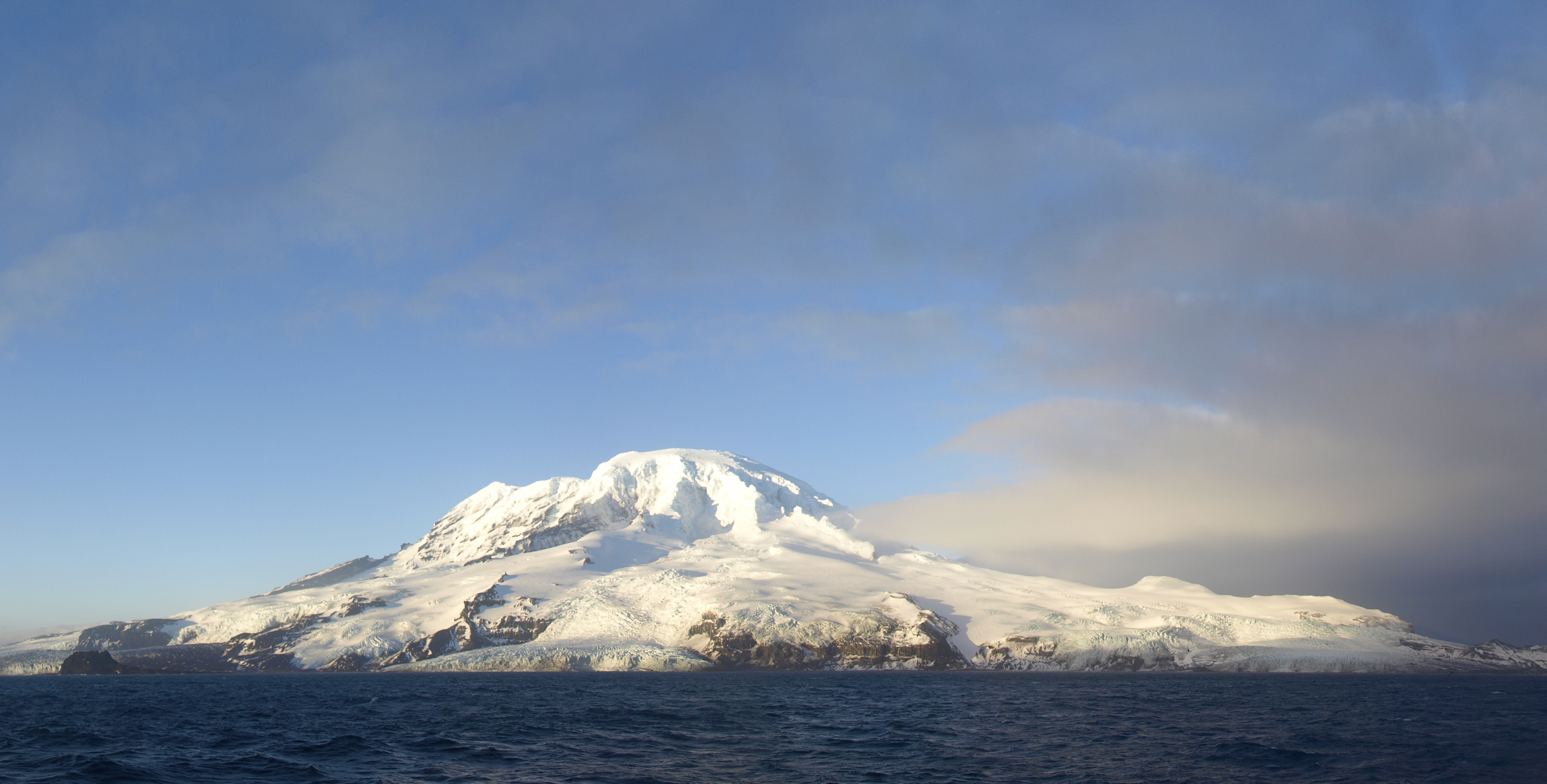
- Mawson Peak in 2009

Highest point
- Elevation: 2,745 m (9,006 ft)
- Listing: Country high point Ultra
- Coordinates: 53°06′16″S 73°31′04″E

Geography
- Location within Indian Ocean
- Interactive map of Heard Island with Mawson Peak marked Location of Heard Island
- Location: Heard Island, Australia
- Parent range: Big Ben
- Topo map: RAN Heard Island 291

Geology
- Mountain type: Volcanic cone

Mawson Peak is an active volcanic summit of the Big Ben volcanic massif on Heard Island, an Australian external territory in the Indian Ocean. With an elevation of 2,745 metres (9,006 ft), it is higher than any peak on the Australian mainland and, among Australian mountains, is surpassed only by mountains in the Australian Antarctic Territory. Mawson Peak and other volcanic features on Heard and McDonald Islands are Australia's only active volcanoes. The peak is named after the Australian Antarctic explorer Douglas Mawson.

Mawson Peak is a largely symmetrical volcanic cone with a height of around 706 m (2,316 ft). It lies on top of a plateau that was likely left by a sector collapse on Big Ben. Mawson Peak is believed to have begun forming within approximately the last 40,000 years. It is volcanically active, frequently emitting smoke and vapour and occasionally releasing flows of lava. A small cylindrical crater of pooled lava has been observed on Mawson Peak in the past, but more recent observations suggest that it may have since been replaced by a fissure. Following two failed attempts in 1953 and a failed attempt in 1963, three successful ascents of Mawson Peak have been made in 1965, 1983, and 2000.

== History ==
The first confirmed sighting of Heard Island, a small island in the Southern Indian Ocean that is home to the volcano Big Ben, took place in 1853. The island was occupied by sealers between 1855 and 1882, and brief scientific expeditions were carried out in 1874, 1902 and 1929. A research station was established on the island in 1947 by the Australian National Antarctic Research Expeditions (ANARE), which performed geological surveys and mapping of the island. They gave names to many of the locations on the island, including naming the peak of Big Ben "Mawson Peak" after the Australian Antarctic explorer Douglas Mawson, who had visited the island in 1929.

The first attempt at reaching Mawson Peak was made on 20 August 1953 by three members of the ANARE expedition party: John Béchervaise, Frederick Elliott, and Peter Shaw. They established a camp at an elevation of 900 metres (3,000 ft) the following day but found themselves caught in a blizzard. They became trapped in a snow cave and suffered hypoxia and carbon monoxide poisoning. After deciding that there was little hope of the weather improving, they were forced to descend and return to the research station on 23 August. The same group made a second attempt at climbing the mountain on 2 November. They established an initial camp at an elevation of 900 metres and then climbed up the Abbotsmith Glacier to reach an elevation of 1,500 metres (4,900 ft) on 11 November. On 12 November they became caught in a blizzard that buried their tent. They constructed an igloo, but were eventually forced to descend the mountain once again.

Another party consisting of Warwick Deacock, Grahame Budd, and Jon Stephenson made an attempt at climbing the mountain in 1963. They climbed via the Deacock Glacier and Fiftyone Glacier, and on 7 February they succeeded in establishing a camp on the summit plateau at an elevation of about 2,285 metres (7,500 ft). A storm prevented them from conducting their planned scientific research or attempting to reach the summit, and also separated them from their supplies, forcing them to descend in poor conditions with little food or water.

After being told that ANARE was unlikely to fund another attempt at reaching the summit of Big Ben, Deacock assembled a private expedition called the South Indian Ocean Expedition to Heard Island (SIOEHI) and chartered a schooner named Patanela. He received sponsorships from the Mount Everest Foundation, the newspaper The Australian, and various other organisations. The private expedition party was led by Deacock and consisted of ten men. They sailed from Sydney to Heard Island between 5 November 1964 and 12 January 1965, where five of the men—Deacock, Budd, Phil Temple, Colin Putt, and John Crick—set out to climb Big Ben. Despite experiencing blizzards and heavy clouds, they reached the top of Mawson Peak around midday on 25 January 1965, becoming the first to reach the summit. The Anaconda expedition party were the second group to reach the summit in 1983, followed by the Australian Army Alpine Association in 1999–2000.

== Geography ==
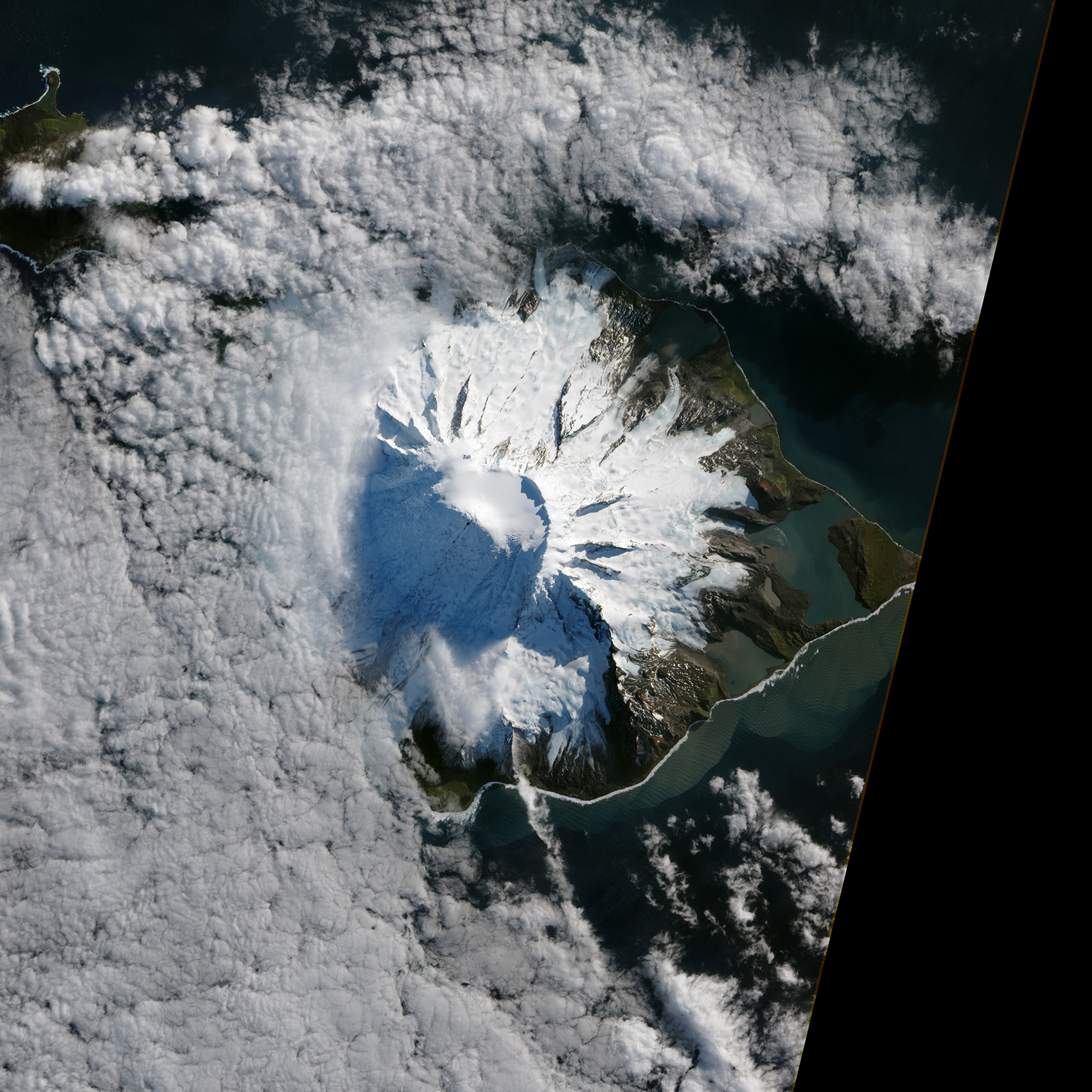
Satellite view of Mawson Peak on Heard Island

Mawson Peak is located on Heard Island, part of the Australian external territory of Heard Island and McDonald Islands, which sits in the Southern Indian Ocean about 4,100 km (2,500 mi) south-west of Perth and 1,700 km (1,100 mi) north of Antarctica. Heard Island is a volcanic island with an area of around 368 square kilometres (142 sq mi) that is dominated by the Big Ben volcanic massif. It lies on the Kerguelen Plateau, a large igneous province up to 3 kilometres (1.9 mi) above the ocean floor that has seen continuous volcanic activity since its formation about 130 million years ago.

Big Ben has a plateau at a height of around 2,285 m (7,497 ft) and is topped by Mawson Peak, which is a 706 m (2,316 ft) volcanic cone. The summit of Mawson Peak has an elevation of 2,745 m (9,006 ft). It is 517 metres (1,696 ft) taller than Mount Kosciuszko, the highest peak in mainland Australia, and is the tallest peak on Australian territory with the exception of mountains in the Australian Antarctic Territory. Along with other volcanic features on Heard and McDonald Islands, it is also one of Australia's only active volcanoes. It is the only known volcano on a sub-Antarctic island to have experienced continuous volcanic activity.

Mawson Peak has a roughly symmetrical cone shape. The location and size of its crater has varied over time, with the crater sometimes absent entirely. In 1986–87, a survey team reported that Mawson Peak featured a 30 m (98 ft) crater with a depth of about 20 m (66 ft). This cylindrical crater was no longer present in 1983 when the summit was reached by an expedition party. In 2009, satellite images suggested that a crater with a diameter of about 180 m (590 ft) was present on Mawson Peak. By 2017, satellite images no longer showed a crater, and instead suggested that it had been replaced by a fissure through which lava was released.

== Geology and volcanic activity ==
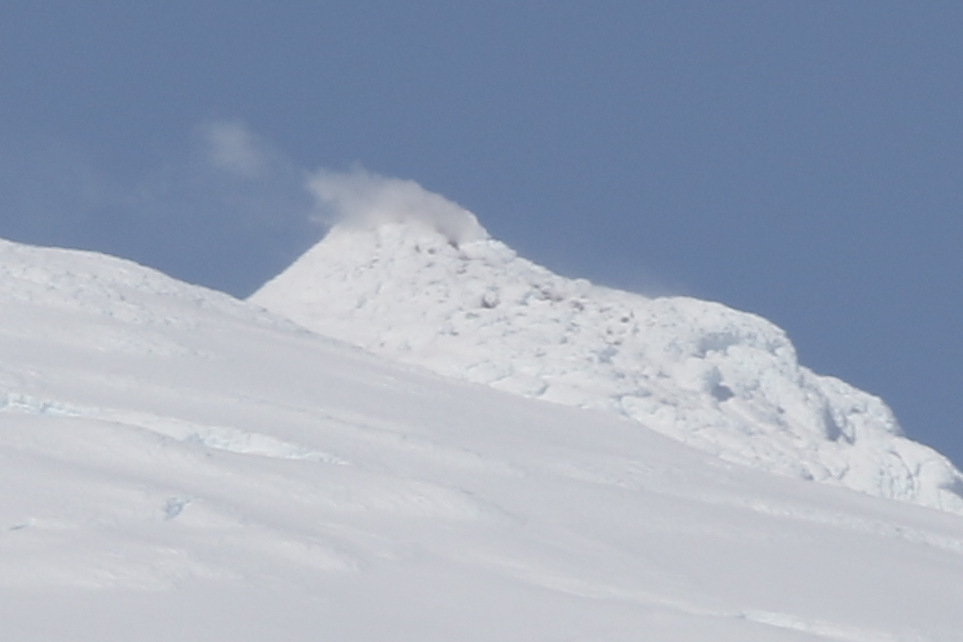
Steam from Mawson Peak

The basement of Heard Island is composed of limestone deposited during the Paleogene period. This is topped by the Drygalski Formation, a layer of volcanic rock and sediment that formed roughly 9 million years ago. Over approximately the last million years, volcanic activity formed Big Ben. The age of Mawson Peak is unknown; a 2021 study estimated that it may have begun forming within roughly the last 40,000 years. It sits on top of a plateau on Big Ben that is believed to have been the result of a sector collapse.

The history of volcanic eruptions on Heard Island is poorly understood. During the periods in which it has been observed, Mawson Peak has frequently emitted smoke and vapour and has occasionally released lava, which typically flows down the south-west slopes of Big Ben. Since 2008, lava flows with a length of between 250 metres (820 ft) and 2 kilometres (1.2 mi) have occurred roughly once per year. The volcanic activity on Big Ben is primarily effusive (characterised by steady flows of lava) rather than explosive. A 2021 study estimated that the age of two samples of lava taken from the volcano sat at 11.1±1.1 thousand years and 23.9±2.1 thousand years respectively. Compounds of basanite, basalt, and trachybasalt make up the majority of the volcano's exposed lavas. Mawson Peak has a relatively low average discharge rate of about 200,000 cubic metres (7,100,000 cu ft) of magma per year.

Volcanic activity may be contributing to rapid melting of the glaciers that radiate outwards from Mawson Peak. Increased geothermal heat from volcanic activity can lead to more rapid melting of glacial ice, while volcanic eruptions can cause rapid melting or disruption of glaciers. However, a 2025 study concluded that climate change rather than volcanic activity was likely the primary driver of glacier retreat on Heard Island. This glacial retreat—which has led the total glacial area to decline from an estimated 289.4 km^{2} (111.7 mi^{2}) in 1947 to 225.7 km^{2} (87.1 mi^{2}) in 2019—may also be contributing to increased volcanic activity due to decompression of Heard Island's magma chamber.

== See also ==
- List of volcanoes in Antarctica
- List of volcanoes in Australia
