= Cape Arkona (Heard Island) =

Headland on Heard Island

Coordinates: 53°10′S 73°26′E

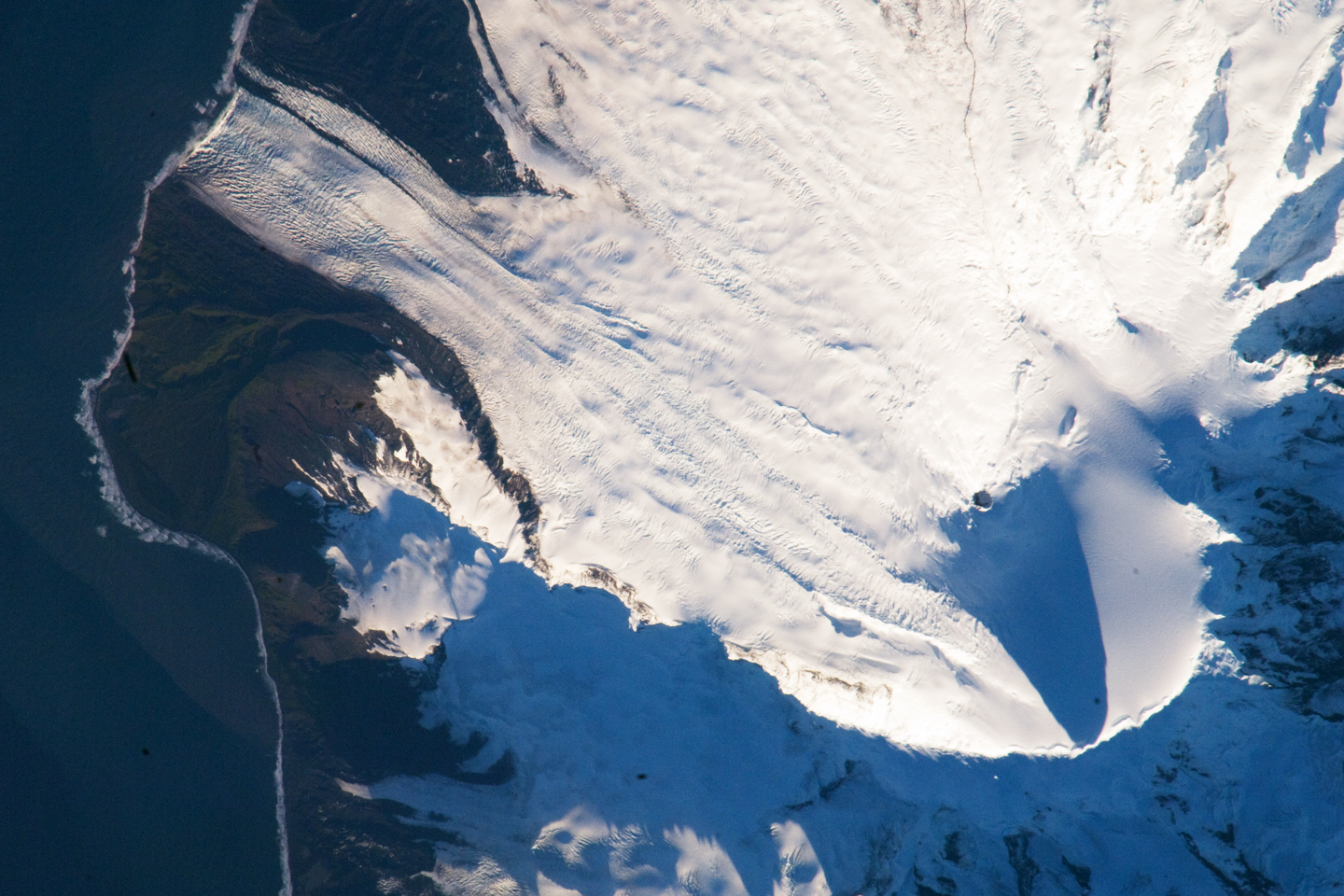
Satellite image of the southern tip of Heard Island. Cape Arkona is seen on the left side of the image, with Lied Glacier just above and Gotley Glacier just below. Big Ben Volcano and Mawson Peak are seen at the lower right side of the image.

Cape Arkona is a rocky headland between the mouths of Lied Glacier and Gotley Glacier on the southwest side of Heard Island in the southern Indian Ocean. The feature appears to be roughly charted on an 1860 sketch map prepared by Captain H.C. Chester, an American sealer operating in the area during this period. The German frigate Arkona (named after a cape on the north of Rügen) (Captain von Reibnitz) examined the south coast of the island in February 1874 and, in Melbourne, provided the officers of HMS Challenger with a position for the cape which was used in preparation of the Admiralty chart. In so doing, however, the misspelling "Cape Arcona" was used on the British chart.

== Map ==
Heard Island and McDonald Islands, including all major topographical features
