= Big Ben (Heard Island) =

Volcano on the Australian subantarctic territory

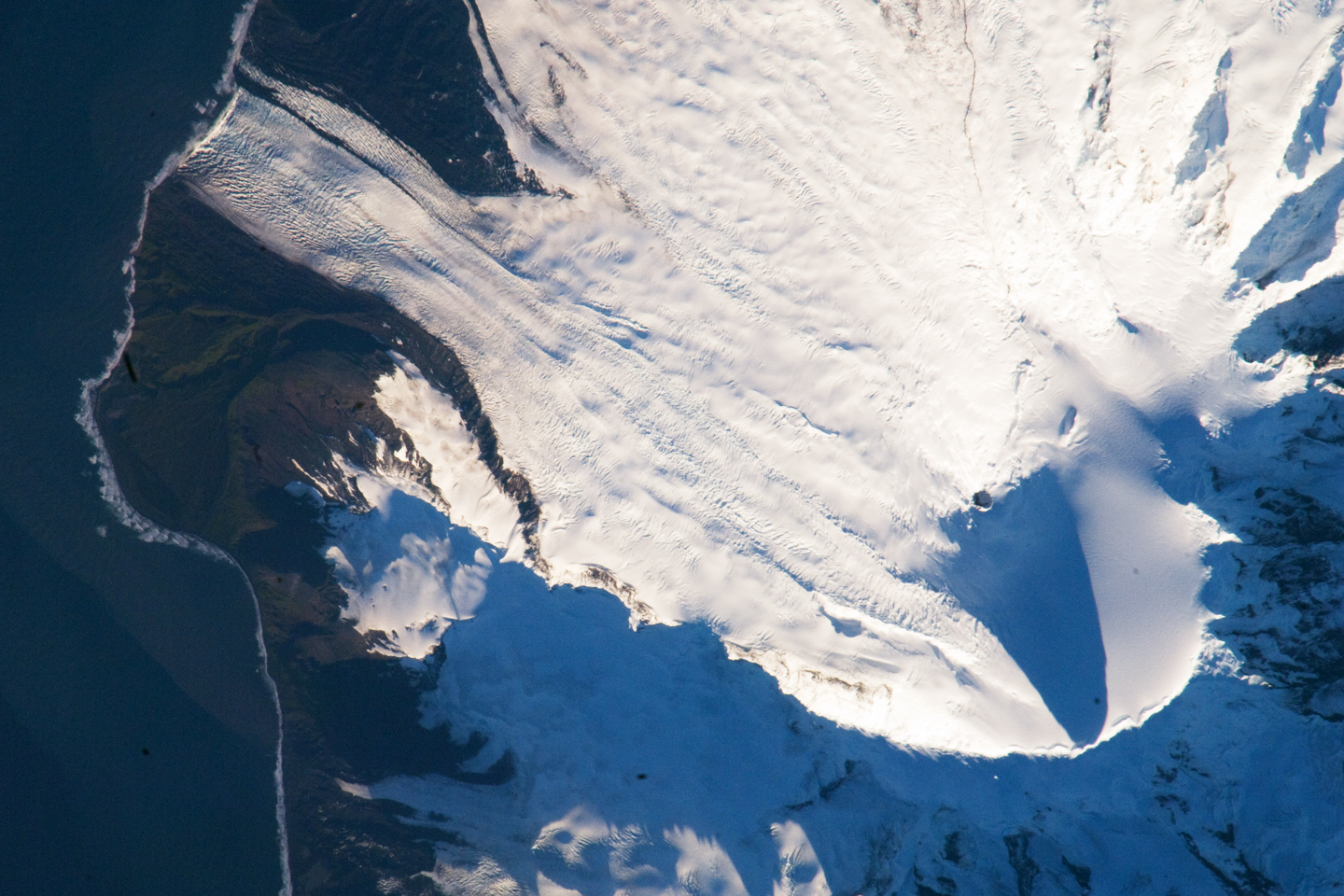
- Satellite image of the southern tip of Heard Island. Cape Arkona is seen on the left side of the image, with Lied Glacier just above and Gotley Glacier just below. Big Ben and Mawson Peak are seen at the lower right side of the image.

Highest point
- Elevation: 2,745 m (9,006 ft)
- Prominence: 2,745 m (9,006 ft)
- Listing: Country high point Ultra
- Coordinates: 53°6′16″S 73°31′4″E

Geography
- Location within Indian Ocean
- Location: Heard Island, Australia
- Topo map: RAN Heard Island 291

Geology
- Rock age: Quaternary
- Mountain type: Stratovolcano
- Last eruption: 2012 – ongoing (as of 2021)

Big Ben (previously known as Big Ben Peak, Old Ben Mountain, Emperor William Peak and Kaiser Wilhelm-Berg) is a volcanic massif that dominates the geography of Heard Island in the southern Indian Ocean. It is a stratovolcano with a diameter of about 25 km (16 mi). Its highest point is Mawson Peak, which is 2,745 m (9,006 ft) above sea level. Much of it is covered by ice, including 14 major glaciers which descend from Big Ben to the sea. Big Ben is the highest mountain in Australian states and territories, except for the Australian Antarctic Territory. The Australian Antarctic Territory is a territorial claim unrecognised by most other countries, meaning that Big Ben is the highest mountain over which Australia has true sovereignty. A smaller volcanic headland, the Laurens Peninsula, extends about 10 km (6 mi) to the northwest, created by a separate volcano, Mount Dixon; its highest point is Anzac Peak, at 715 m (2,346 ft).

Big Ben was first summited on 25 January 1965 by five members of the Southern Indian Ocean Expedition to Heard Island (sometimes referred to as the Patanela expedition).

== Volcanic activity ==
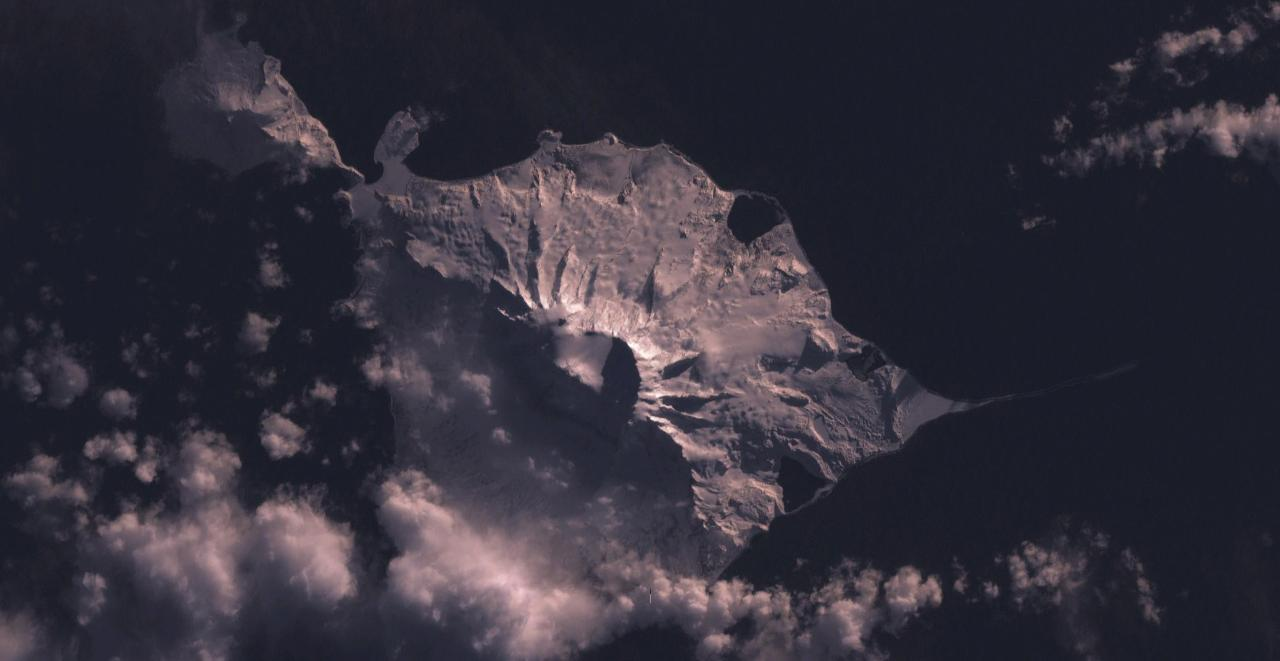
Big Ben is the large massif to the bottom right (southeast) of this image of Heard Island, from NASA WorldWind

Big Ben formed about one million years ago. Volcanic activity at the cone has been known since 1881. An eruption occurred in 1993. Satellite images detected eruptions during 2000. On 2 February 2016, observations from Atlas Cove, 15 km (9 mi) northwest of Mawson Peak, showed plumes up to 1 km (3,300 ft) high over the volcano. Satellite images showed hotspots at various times from 2003 to 2008, and during September 2012. A further eruption was reported on 2 February 2016, and was recorded by scientists who happened to be in the area on an expedition. Big Ben does not endanger humans because Heard Island is uninhabited.

Sentinel-2 satellite imagery suggests another eruption occurred in May 2023.

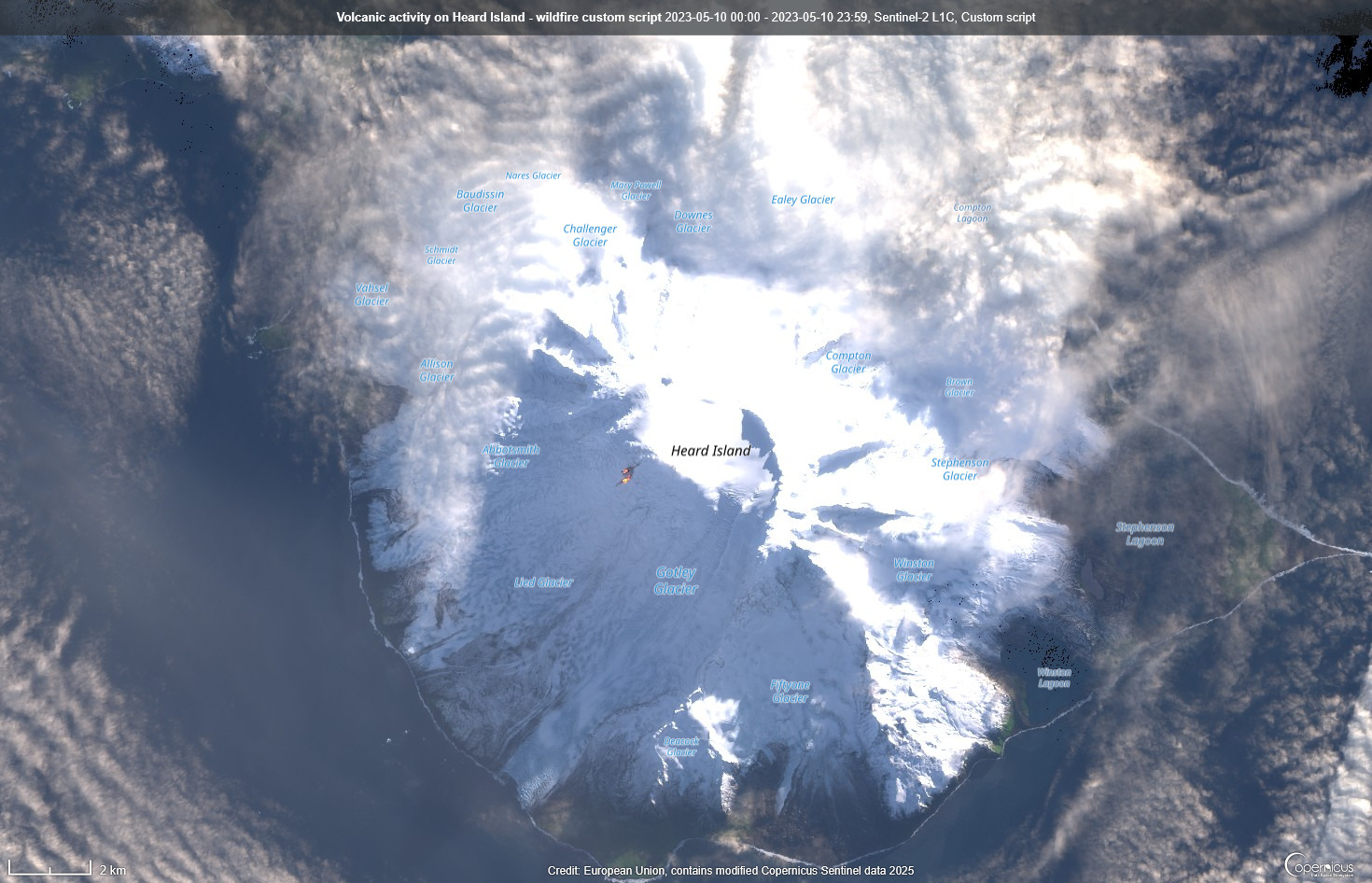
Sentinel-2 image of Heard Island showing volcanic activity. This is not a true color image; thermal activity has been highlighted using short-wave infrared channels.

Big Ben is in a remote location, and without regular observation, it is possible that eruptions have occurred at other times.

== See also ==
- List of volcanoes in Australia
