= List of Consolidated PBY Catalina operators =

The List of Consolidated PBY Catalina operators lists the countries and their naval aviation and air force units that have operated the aircraft:

== Military operators ==
=== Argentina ===
- Argentine Naval Aviation 17 "Canso" received 1946-48

=== Australia ===
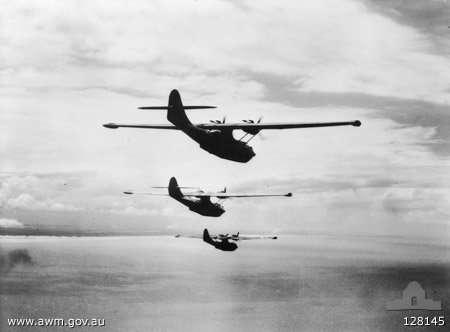
A formation of Australian Catalinas in 1943

The Royal Australian Air Force operated the PBY Catalina extensively. The Royal Australian Air Force ordered its first 18 PBY-5s (named Catalina) in 1940, around the same time as French purchase. Some of these would be used to re-establish the British-Australian airlink through Asia as the Double Sunrise. By the end of the war the RAAF had taken delivery of 168 Catalinas. The RAAF used Catalinas in a wide range of roles including reconnaissance and anti-submarine patrols, offensive mine-laying and air-sea rescue, the deployment of folboats (collapsible canoes), notably the Hoehn MKIII military type for Commando raids. The rescue of personnel and closer visual observation, as well as psychological warfare. In addition, RAAF PBYs were used to transport Australian personnel home at the end of the war. The RAAF retired its last Catalina in 1952.

Royal Australian Air Force

- No. 11 Squadron RAAF
- No. 20 Squadron RAAF observation
- No. 40 Squadron RAAF had aircraft placed on establishment, but not actually issued.
- No. 42 Squadron RAAF
- No. 43 Squadron RAAF
- No. 6 Communication Unit RAAF
- No. 8 Communication Unit RAAF
- No. 111 Air-Sea Rescue Flight RAAF
- No. 112 Air-Sea Rescue Flight RAAF
- No. 113 Air-Sea Rescue Flight RAAF
- Seaplane Training Flight RAAF
- No. 3 Operational Training Unit RAAF
- Search and Rescue Wing RAAF

=== Brazil ===
- 1st Air Transport Squadron (ETA-1)

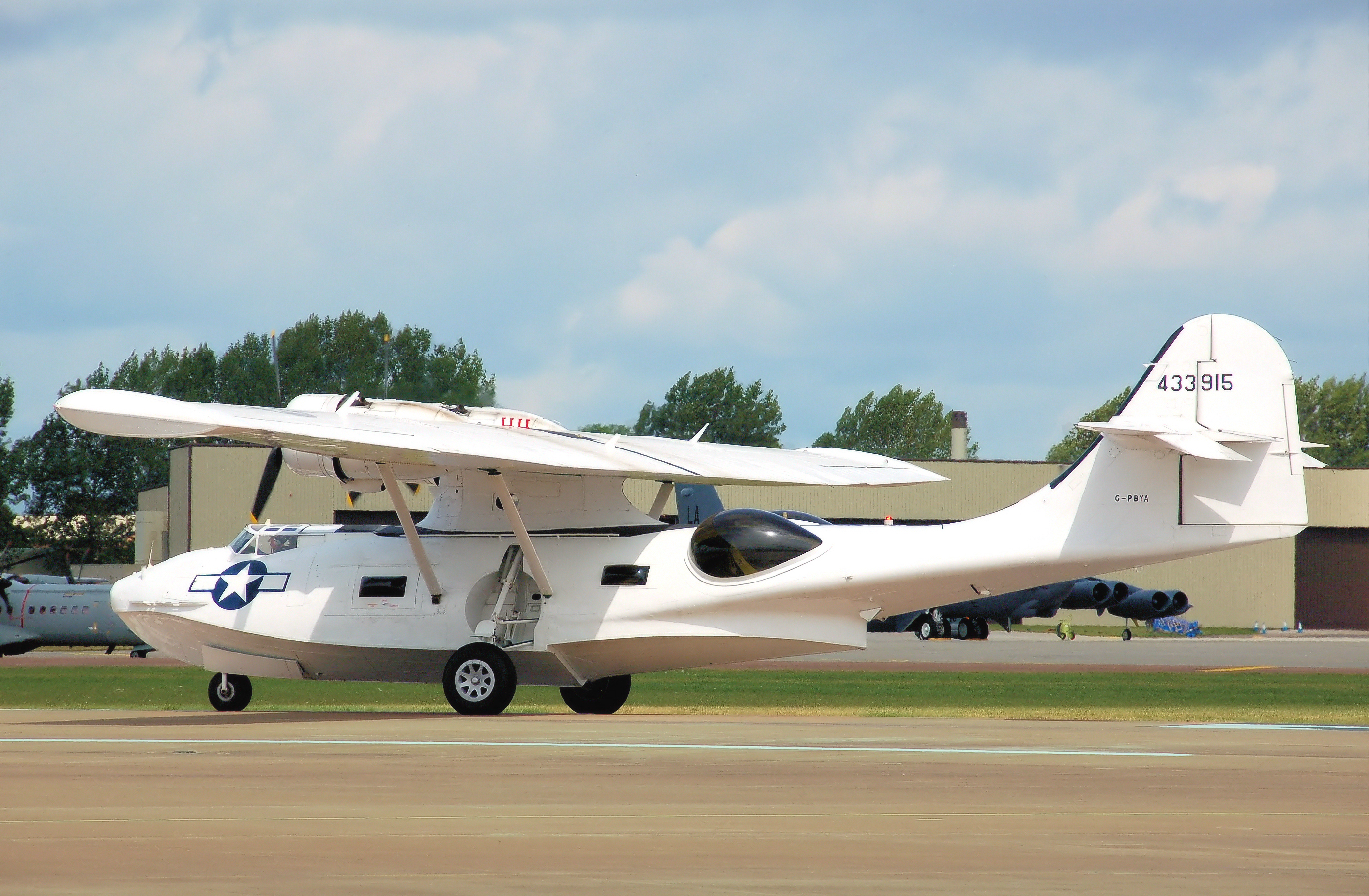
Canadian Vickers PBV-1A Canso A at RIAT, England in 2009. A version of the PBY-5A Catalina, this aircraft was built in 1944 for the Royal Canadian Air Force

=== Canada ===
Canada had its own close associations with the PBY, both as a manufacturer and customer. Under an agreement reached between the Canadian and U.S. governments, production lines were laid down in Canada, by Boeing Aircraft of Canada (as the PB2B-1) in Vancouver, and by Canadian Vickers (PBV-1) at the Canadair plant in Cartierville. Canadian manufactured aircraft serving with the RCAF were known as Canso A, and were equivalent to PBY-5A (with retractable landing gear). Eleven Canadian Home War Establishment squadrons flew Cansos and Lend Lease Catalinas and on both sides of the North Atlantic and on the Pacific West Coast of Canada. Two "overseas" squadrons flew from the British Isles, as well as over the Indian Ocean.

Royal Canadian Air Force

- Article XV squadrons serving under direct command and control of the RAF, with RAF owned aircraft.
  - No. 413 Squadron RCAF Catalina I/IB/IV (Jul 41 - Dec 44) (UK and Ceylon).
  - No. 422 Squadron RCAF Catalina IB/III/IV (Jul 42 - Nov 42) (while working up to operational status).
- Operational Squadrons of the Home War Establishment (HWE) (Based in Canada)
  - Eastern Air Command
    - No. 5 Squadron RCAF Catalina I (Jun 41 - Jul 41); Canso A (Oct 41 - Jun 45)
    - No. 116 Squadron RCAF Catalina I/IB (Jul 41 - Aug 43); Canso A (Sep 43 - Jun 45)
    - No. 117 Squadron RCAF Catalina I/IB/IVA (May 42 - Dec 43); Canso A (May 42 - Aug 43)
    - No. 160 Squadron RCAF Canso A (May 43 - Jun 45)
    - No. 161 Squadron RCAF Canso A (Nov 43 - May 45)
    - No. 162 Squadron RCAF Canso A (May 42 - Aug 45)
  - Western Air Command
    - No. 4 Squadron RCAF Canso A (Dec 42 - Aug 45); Catalina IB/IVA (Apr 44 - Aug 44)
    - No. 6 Squadron RCAF Canso A (Apr 43 - Nov 43); Catalina IB/IVA (Sept 43 - Aug 45)
    - No. 7 Squadron RCAF Catalina IVA (Jan 44 - Jul 45); Canso A (Apr 44 - Jul 45)
    - No. 9 Squadron RCAF Canso A (Apr 43 - Aug 44); Catalina I/IB/IVA (Feb 44 - Aug 44)
    - No. 120 Squadron RCAF Canso A (Apr 43 - Sep 43); Catalina IVA (Sep 43 - Apr 44)
- 103 Search and Rescue Squadron

=== Chile ===
Chilean Air Force

=== Colombia ===
Colombian Air Force
SATENA
Avianca
AIDA
Aeropesca
VIARCO

=== Cuba ===
Cuban Navy 1952-1961

=== Denmark ===
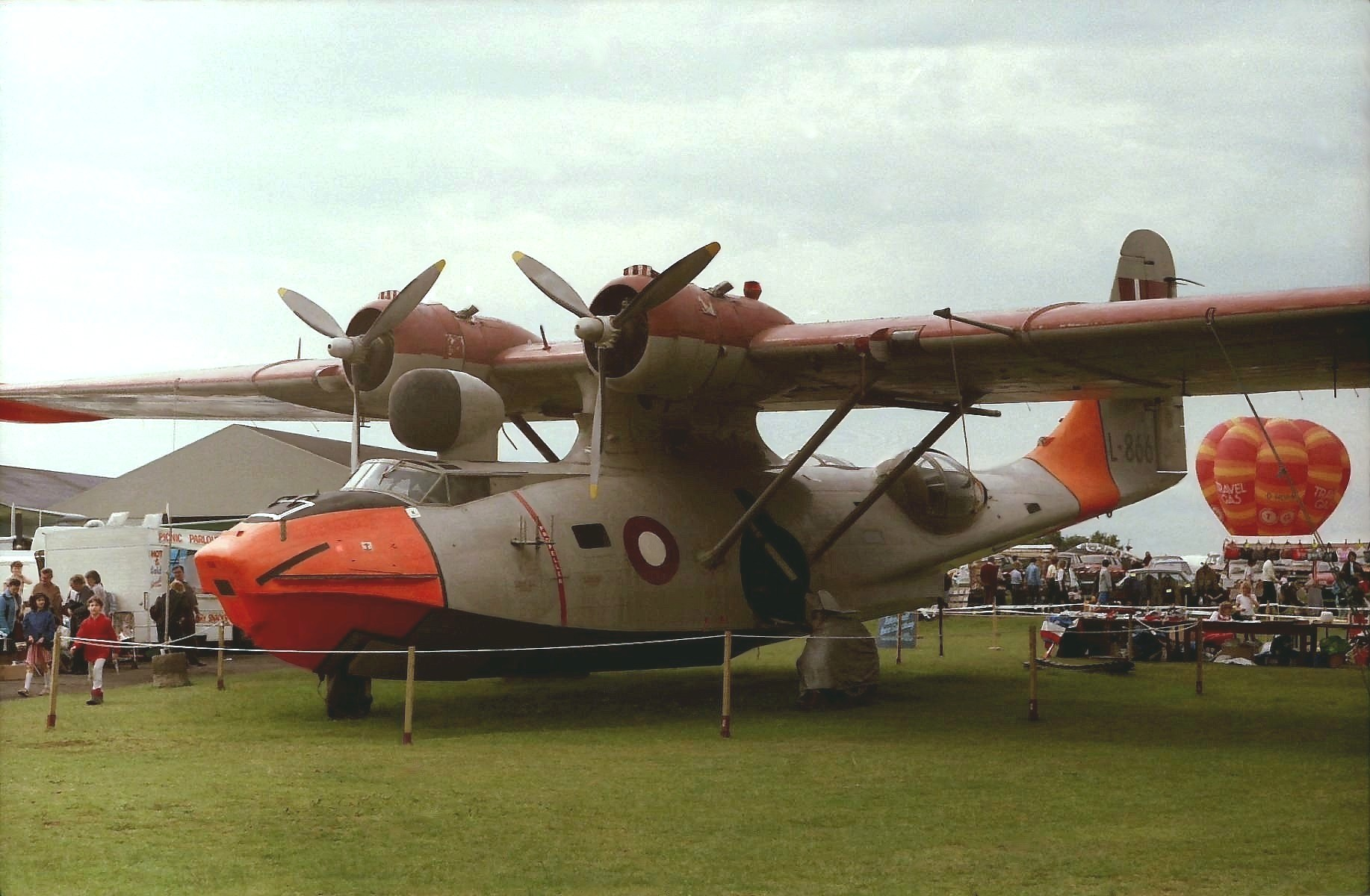
Royal Danish Air Force PBY-6A Catalina L-866.

Royal Danish Air Force

- No. 721 Squadron RDAF received aircraft from No. 722 Squadron RDAF in 1965.
- No. 722 Squadron RDAF transferred aircraft to No. 721 Squadron RDAF in 1965.

=== France ===
Soon after the receipt of Britain's first order for production aircraft, a French purchasing mission ordered 30 aircraft in early 1940. Allocated the Consolidated identification Model 28-5MF, none of these were delivered before the Battle of France.

=== Iceland ===
Icelandic Coast Guard

- ICG Aeronautical Division

=== Indonesia ===
Indonesian Air Force

- 5th Air Squadron

=== Israel ===
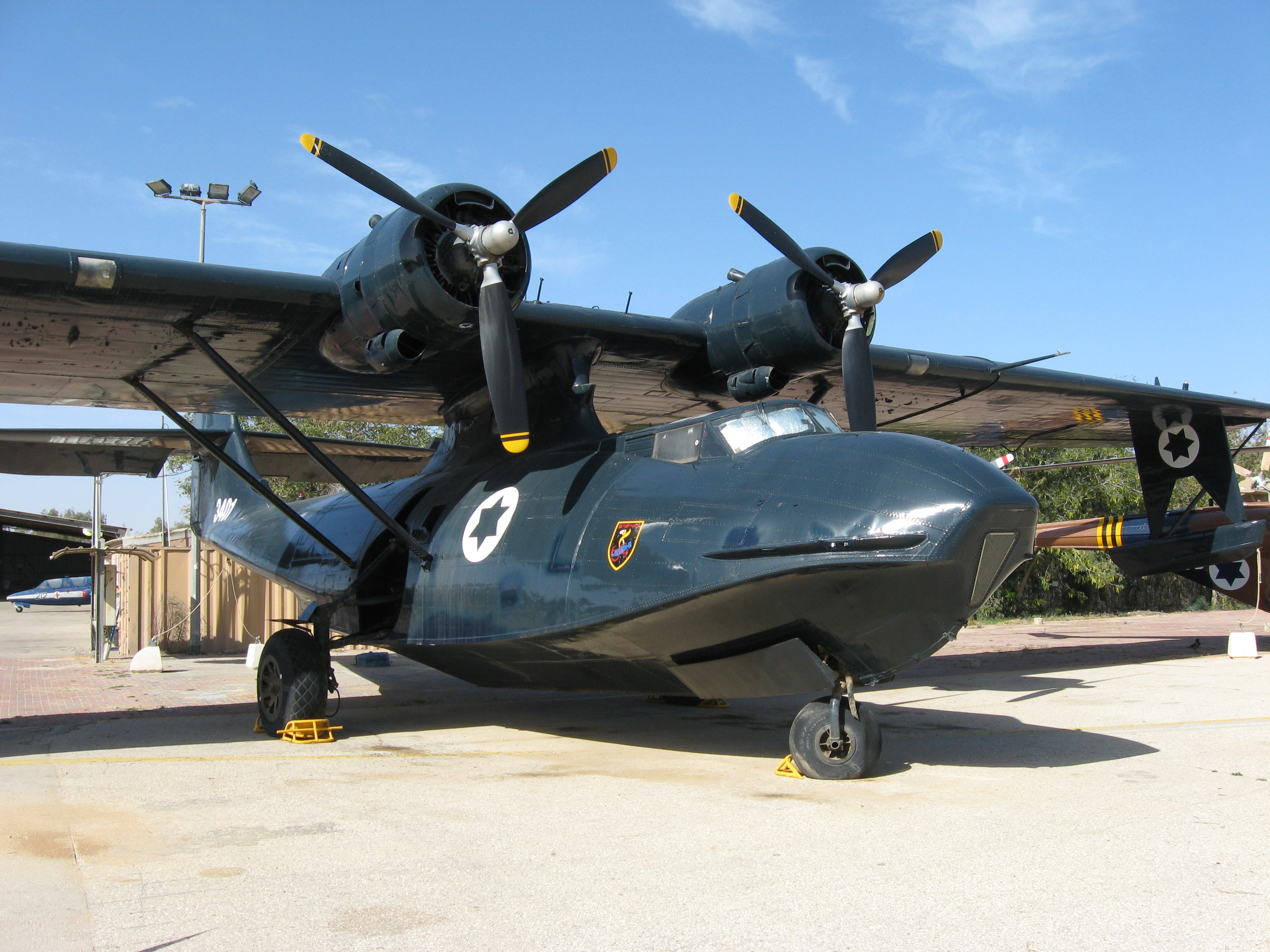
A Catalina at the Israeli Air Force Museum in Hatzerim

Israeli Air Force

- 69 Squadron

=== Japan ===
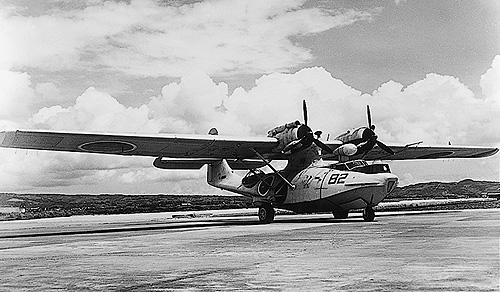
A PBY-6A of No. 91 Squadron JMSDF

Japan Maritime Self-Defense Force

- No. 91 Squadron JMSDF

=== Mexico ===
Mexican navy 6 units

=== Netherlands ===
Netherlands ordered 48 planes for use in the Dutch East Indies.

Royal Netherlands Navy

- No. 321 Squadron RAF (1942-1945) squadron transferred to the Royal Netherlands Air Force

Dutch Naval Aviation Service

=== New Zealand ===
From 1942 New Zealand used 56 non-amphibious PBY-5 and PB2B-1 Catalinas in the South Pacific, to replace the Short Singapore with the Royal New Zealand Air Force's 5 Squadron and 6 Squadron, initially operating out of Hobsonville and Fiji on maritime patrol and air-sea rescue roles. Additional RAF-owned aircraft were used by 490 (NZ) Squadron in the anti submarine role during the battle of the Atlantic. 490 squadron operated Catalinas out of Jui, West Africa, from 1943 until they were superseded by Short Sunderlands in 1944. The last RNZAF Catalinas were retired in 1953 and all had been sold or scrapped by the end of 1956. An airworthy PBY-5A Catalina amphibian in 6 Squadron markings is privately owned. The Royal New Zealand Air Force Museum is restoring a former fire training Catalina.

Royal New Zealand Air Force

- No. 5 Squadron RNZAF
- No. 6 Squadron RNZAF
- No. 490 Squadron RNZAF (1943-1945)

=== Nicaragua ===
Nicaraguan Air Force

=== Norway ===
Royal Norwegian Air Force

- No. 330 (Norwegian) Squadron RAF (1942-1943)
- No. 333 (Norwegian) Squadron RAF (1943-1945) transferred to the Royal Norwegian Air Force in November 1945

=== Paraguay ===
Paraguayan Air Force originally ordered three PBY-5As in 1955. One was destroyed in the U.S. before delivery. The other two reached Paraguay and received serials T-29 and T-31. T-29 rescued ex-President Perón in October 1955 in Argentina. Both aircraft were transferred to Líneas Aéreas de Transporte Nacional (LATN) in 1956.

=== Philippines ===
The Philippine Air Force used the boats during the early independence fro commonwealth government .The PBY-5A Catalina that fulfilled the air-sea rescue role. All scrapped upon retirement.

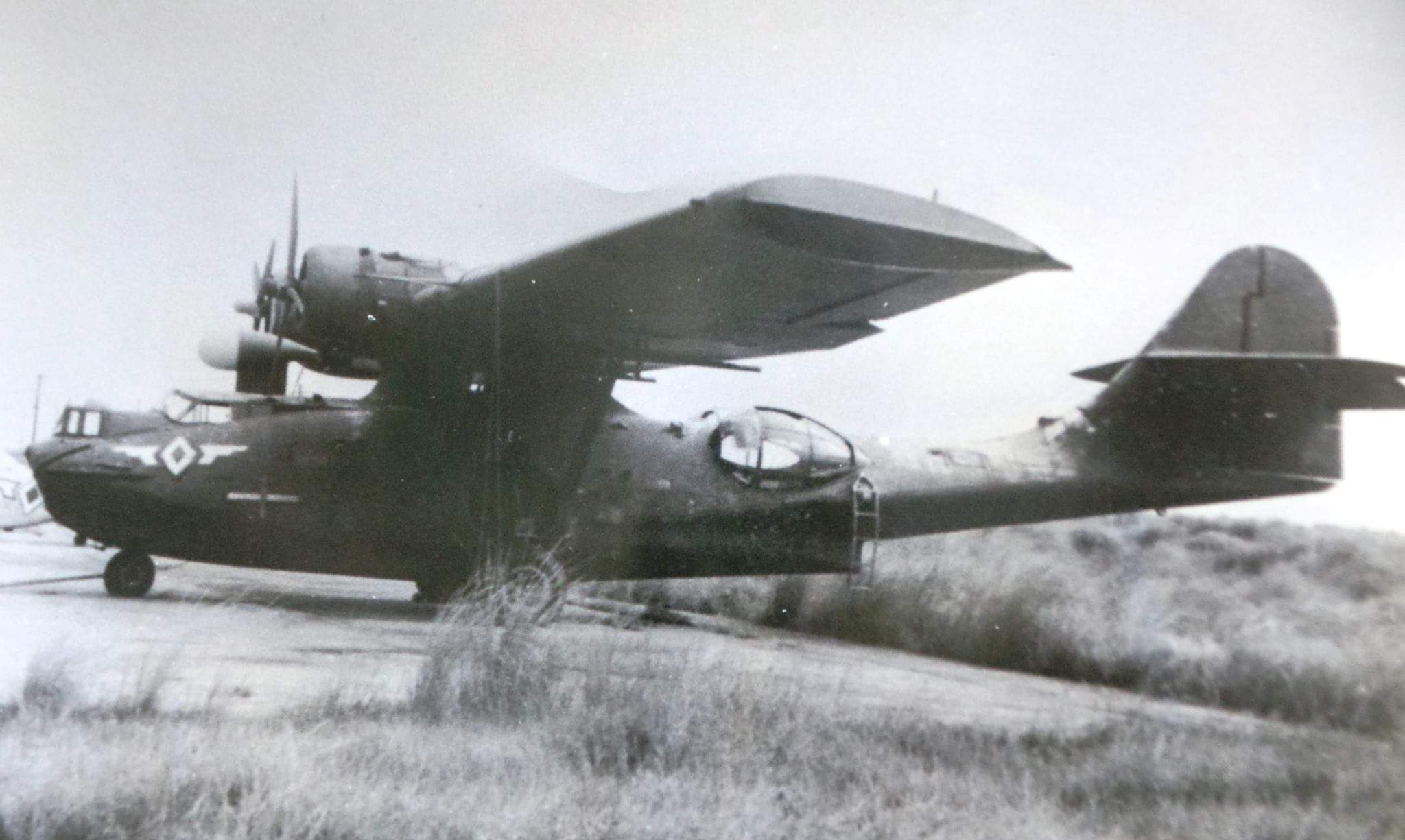
Philippine Air Force Consolidated PBY Catalina 1954

=== South Africa ===
Consolidated Catalina PBY's were flown by 6, 10 and 43 Squadrons of the South African Air Force during World War II. The squadrons and aircraft were placed under command of SAAF Coastal Command and operated on the South African Indian and Atlantic coastlines. After World War II, Catalinas were utilized by 35 Squadron from 1945 to 1957.

=== Spain ===
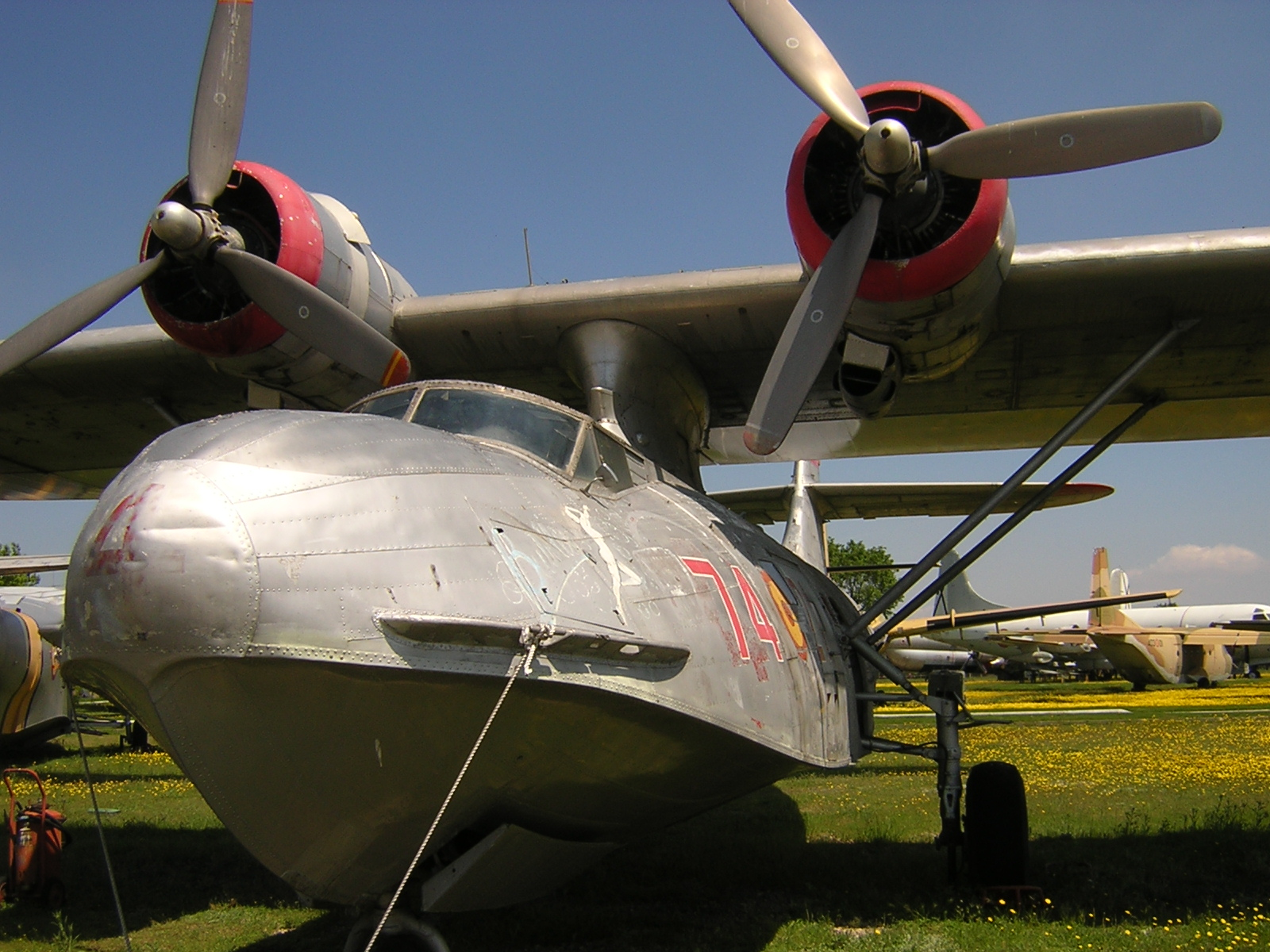
Spanish Air Force Catalina 74-21 on display at the Spanish Air Force museum in Cuatro Vientos, Madrid

The Spanish Air Force used one unit, under DR.1 designation and 74-21 indication, as a patrol bomber and firefighter plane between 1949 and 1954. This aircraft was a United States Army Air Forces unit, which landed by accident in the Spanish Sahara in 1943, and finally it was sold to the Spanish Air force for approximately US$100,000. It is currently on display at the Museo del Aire (Madrid).

Spanish Air Force

=== Sweden ===
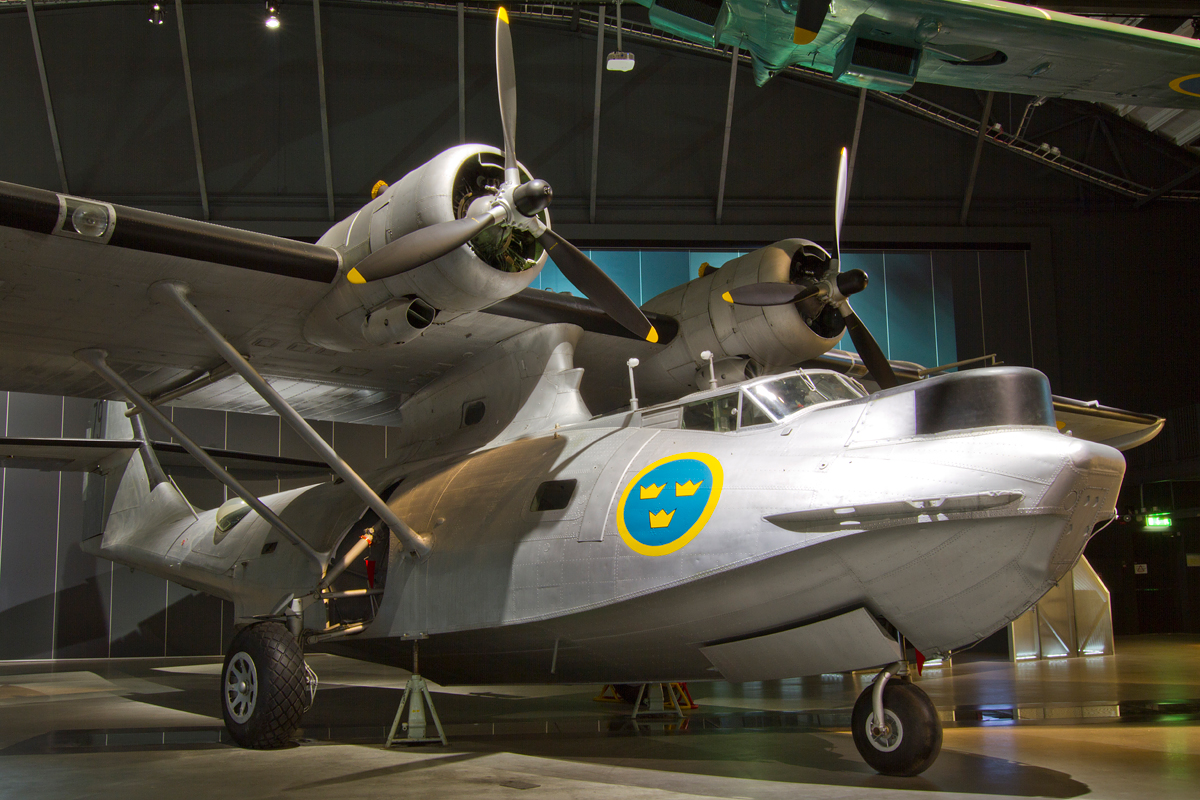
Swedish Air Force Consolidated PBY Catalina on display at the Swedish Air Force museum in Linkoping, Sweden

Three Canso amphibians, built by Canadian-Vickers, were bought by the Swedish Air Force in 1947. The Swedish designation was Tp 47. After modifications for their new post-war missions, they were based at Wing F2 at Hägernäs near Stockholm and were used mainly for air and sea rescue service. Also reconnaissance missions were flown.

The Tp 47 was equipped with PS-19/A radar. The aircraft had a crew of five and had also room for six stretchers. It was powered by two Pratt & Whitney R-1830-92 Twin Wasp 14-cylinder radial engines of 1.200 hp each. It was unarmed.

Swedish Air Force

=== Soviet Union ===
The Soviet Union had shown an interest, resulting in an order for three aircraft and the negotiation of a licence to build the type in USSR. When these three machines were delivered they were accompanied by a team of Consolidated engineers who assisted in establishment of the Soviet production facilities. This aircraft model, designated GST, was powered by two Wright R-1820-derived, nine-cylinder Shvetsov M-62 or ASh-62IR single-row radial engines of 900 to 1,000 hp (671 to 746 kW). The first GST entered service towards the end of 1939. It is estimated hundreds more served with the Soviet Navy. Soviet Union also received 138 PBN-1 Nomad variant of the Catalina built by the Naval Aircraft Factory in Philadelphia along with 48 PBY-6As under the Lend-Lease Act.

Soviet Naval Aviation

=== Taiwan ===
The Republic of China Air Force operated PBY-5A as search and rescue (SAR) plane from 1952 to 1954. At least one of these PBY-5A were later transferred to China Airlines in the 1959.

=== United Kingdom ===
The British Air Ministry purchased a single aircraft for evaluation purposes, the Model 28-5. This was flown across the Atlantic Ocean to the Marine Aircraft Experimental Establishment, Felixstowe, in July 1939. With the outbreak of war anticipated, the trials were terminated prematurely, and an initial 50 aircraft were ordered under as "Catalina I"s. These aircraft were similar to the PBY-5, except for installation of British armament. The name Catalina had been used by Consolidated for their commercial sales prior to the British order, and was eventually adopted by the US Navy on October 1, 1941.

Initial deliveries of the Royal Air Force's Catalinas began in early 1941 and these entered service with No. 209 and No. 240 squadrons of Coastal Command. In all, nine squadrons of Coastal Command were equipped with the Catalina, as were an additional 12 squadrons overseas. The total acquisition was approximately 700 spread over the following designations: Catalina Mk I, Mk IA (PBY-5A amphibian in RCAF service only), Mk IB, Mk II, Mk III, Mk IVB (Canadian built PBY-5, the PB2B-1), Mk IV, and Mk VI (a PBN-1 style tall tail version built in Canada). The Catalina Mk Vs, which would have been PBN-1s, were cancelled.

The RAF also acquired a former Soviet Navy GST which landed in Cyprus in November 1941, although it probably was not used before it was beached in a gale at Aboukir in February 1943.

In British service, the Catalina was fitted with .303 machineguns, typically a Vickers K in the bow and Browning Model 1919 in the waist. Some received the Leigh light to aid anti-submarine warfare by night.

Royal Air Force

- No. 119 Squadron RAF (1941 and 1941)
- No. 190 Squadron RAF (1943)
- No. 191 Squadron RAF (1943-1945)
- No. 202 Squadron RAF (1941-1945)
- No. 205 Squadron RAF (1941-1945)
- No. 209 (Hong Kong) Squadron RAF (1941-1945)
- No. 210 Squadron RAF (1941-1945)
- No. 212 Squadron RAF (1942-1945)
- No. 240 Squadron RAF (1941-1945)
- No. 259 Squadron RAF (1943-1945)
- No. 262 Squadron RAF (1942-1943) squadron transferred to South African Air Force as No. 35 Squadron.
- No. 265 Squadron RAF (1943-1945)
- No. 270 Squadron RAF (1942-1944)
- No. 357 Squadron RAF (1944)
- No. 628 Squadron RAF (1944)
- No. 4 (Coastal) Operational Training Unit RAF (1941-1943)
- No. 131 (Coastal) Operational Training Unit RAF (1942-1945)
- No. 302 Ferry Training Unit RAF (1942-1945)

=== United States ===
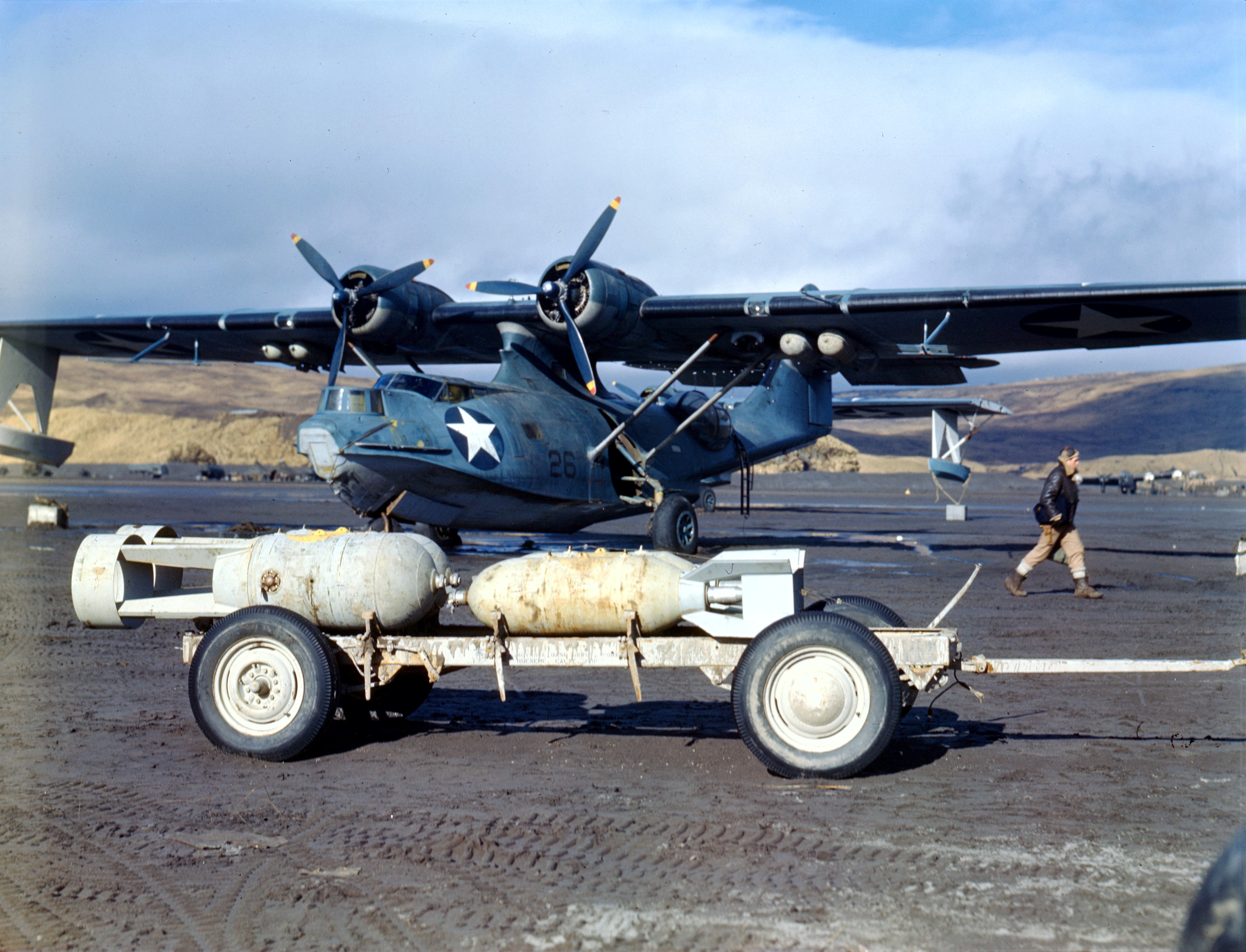
U.S. Navy Consolidated PBY-5A Catalina is loaded with depth charges and bombs at Adak in the Aleutians, in 1943.

United States Navy

- VP-1
- VP-2
- VP-3
- VP-4
- VP-5
- VP-6
- VP-7
- VP-8
- VP-9
- VP-10
- VP-11
- VP-12
- VP-15
- VP-16
- VP-17
- VP-18
- VP-19
- VP-20
- VP-21
- VP-31
- VP-33
- VP-34
- VP-43
- VP-44
- VP-45
- VP-52
- VP-53
- VP-54
- VP-61
- VP-62
- VP-62 (1943-4)
- VP-63
- VP-83
- VP-71
- VP-84
- VP-91
- VP-92
- VP-93
- VP-94
- VP-100
- VP-900
- VP-905
- VP-906
- VP-907
- VP-911
- VP-916
- VP-917
- VP-AM-5
- VB-102
- FltAirPhotoRonLant

United States Army Air Forces

- 1st Emergency Rescue Squadron (OA-10A)
- 2d Emergency Rescue Squadron (OA-10A)
- 3d Emergency Rescue Squadron (OA-10A)
- 4th Emergency Rescue Squadron (OA-10A)

== Civilian operators ==
=== Australia ===
Ansett Flying Boat Services
Trans Australia Airlines

1 ex-Cathay Pacific/Macau Air Transport Company CBY-5A (acquired from United States Army Air Forces via RCAF) used from 1962-1966

Qantas

Between 1940 and 1945, five ex-RAAF aircraft were used by Qantas for a Ceylon to Perth service.

=== Brazil ===
Aero Geral
Cruzeiro do Sul
Panair do Brasil
Paraense Transportes Aéreos
TABA – Transportes Aéreos Bandeirantes
VASD – Viação Aérea Santos Dumont

=== Canada ===
The following PBY-5A are listed with Transport Canada

Canadian Warplane Heritage
David Dorosh
Exploits Valley Air Services
Fondation Aerovision Quebec
Pacific Flying Boats
Savethecanso

=== China ===
China National Aviation Corporation

China National Aviation Corporation operated at least one Catalina or Canso amphibian

=== Chile ===
Aeroservicos Parrague

Operated five PBYs, with services including scheduled operations from Chile to Easter Island and Tahiti.

=== Colombia ===
Satena

=== Hong Kong ===
Cathay Pacific Airways/Macau Air Transport Company 1946-1961

2 ex-United States Army Air Force/Royal Canadian Air Force CBY-5A with one lost to crash in 1948

=== Iceland ===
Flugfélag Íslands

Operated a total of three Catalina's, named Gamli-Pétur, Sæfaxi og Skýfaxi, from 1944 to 1961.

Loftleiðir

Operated two Catalina's, named Vestfirðingur and Dynjandi.

=== Indonesia ===
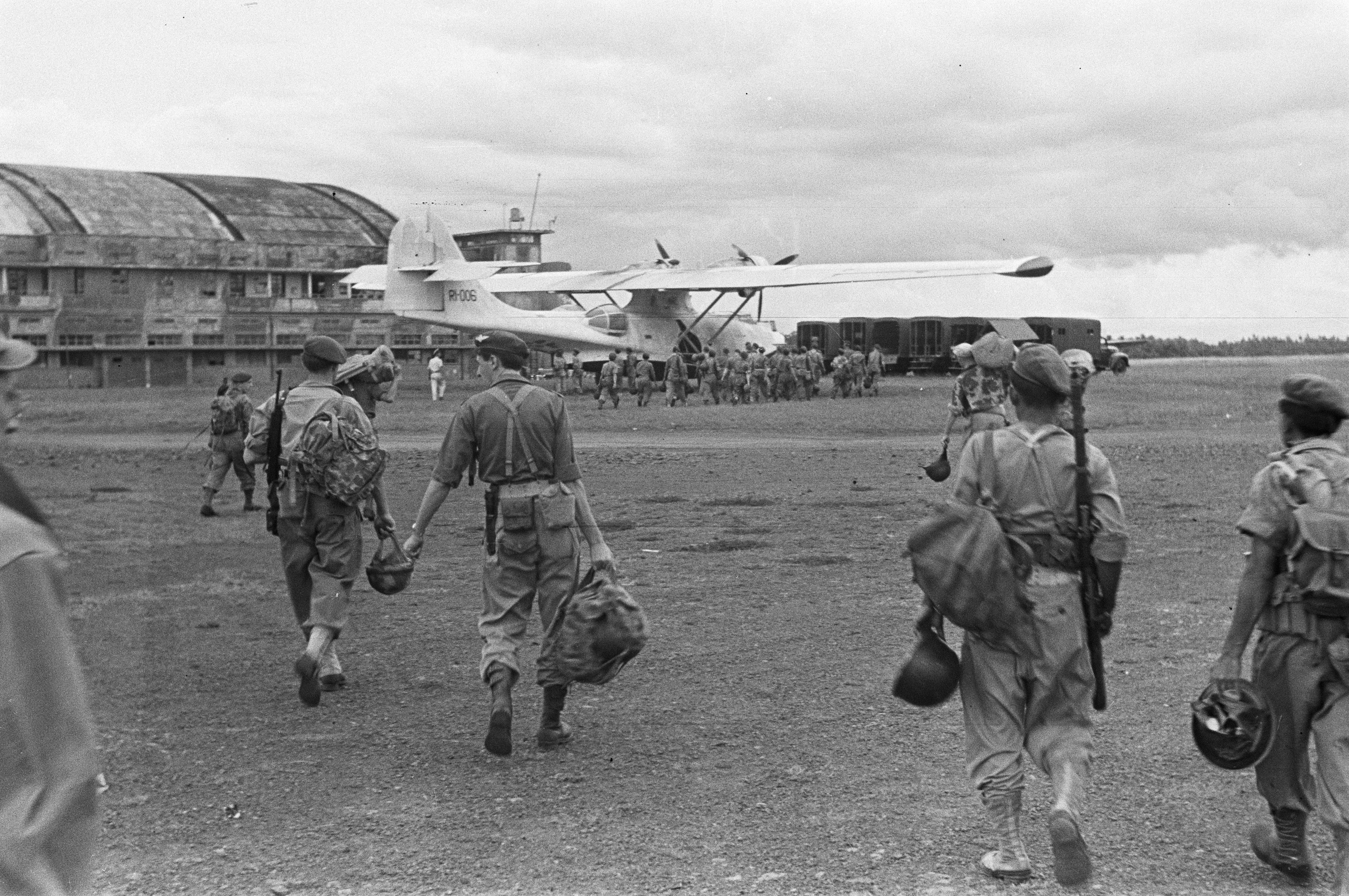
Dutch KST paratroops with the Catalina RI-006 at Maguwo airfield.

Government of Indonesia

The Indonesian government operated at least two Catalinas, registration number RI-005 and RI-006, during the Indonesian National Revolution. RI-005 sank in a river in Jambi while trying to escape from the approaching Dutch troops on 29 December 1948, while RI-006 was captured by Dutch paratroops at Maguwo airfield near Yogyakarta on 19 December 1948.

Garuda Indonesian Airways

Received seven Catalinas from KLM Interinsulair Bedrijf, operated 1950–1953.

=== New Zealand ===
When Tasman Empire Airways TEAL was expanding post-war an ex-RNZAF Boeing PB2B-1 Catalina NZ4035 was acquired as a crew training aircraft in late 1947 as ZK-AMI. This was returned to the military in November 1948. A second PB2B-1 Catalina, NZ4038, was civilianised as ZK-AMP in December 1948 and used as a survey aircraft to establish the Auckland-Suva, Suva-Satupuala(W Samoa), Samoa-Aitutaki(Cooks), Cooks-Tahiti sector, later famous as the 'Coral Route'. This aircraft was returned to the RNZAF in 1951.

=== Paraguay ===
Líneas Aéreas de Transporte Nacional (LATN) operated two PBY-5As during the late 1950s and the early 1960s. They were registered ZP-CBA and ZP-CBB. ZP-CBB was destroyed in an accident in the Paraguay River in Asunción in 1957, killing its pilot LtCol. Leo Nowak. ZP-CBA was transferred to the FAP in the early 1970s. In the 1980s it was reserialed as FAP2002.

=== Philippines ===
Amphibian Airways, a Philippines-registered airlines operated PBY OA-10A in the late 1940s in the Philippines and Burma.

=== Taiwan ===
China Airlines

China Airlines was funded by two PBY-5A. At least one of the PBY was transferred from the Republic of China Air Force. it operates PBY-5A from 1959 to 1966. One of the aircraft was abandoned in 1962, while the other one was operated until 1966.

TransAsia Airways

TransAsia Airways operates at least two PBY-5A from 1951 to 1958. One of the PBY was damaged by the strike of Typhoon at Taipei. The other PBY was missing while flying from Matsu Islands to Taipei.

=== Venezuela ===
CVG Ferrominera Orinoco

=== United Kingdom ===
BOAC

Between 1940 and 1945, two ex-RAF aircraft were used by BOAC for a Poole to Lagos service.

Caribbean International Airways Ltd. was operating Catalina passenger service between Grand Cayman, a current UK overseas territory, and both Tampa, Florida and Kingston, Jamaica in 1952.

=== United States ===
Alaska Airlines

Alaska Airlines utilized Super Catalina aircraft during the late 1960s to serve destinations in Alaska that did not have airports.

Alaska Coastal Airlines

This airline and its Catalina aircraft were acquired by Alaska Airlines in 1968.

Antilles Air Boats

Operated Super Catalina aircraft in the Caribbean during the 1970s serving San Juan, Puerto Rico, St. Thomas and St. Croix, U.S. Virgin Islands and other destinations.

Trust Territory Air Service

Owned PBY Catalina ambhibians, contracted with Transocean Air Lines to operate them 1951–1954

== See also ==
- PBY Catalina
- List of surviving PBY Catalina aircraft

== Bibliography ==
- Becker, Dave (1991). On Wings of Eagles: South Africa's Military Aviation History. Durban: Walker-Ramus. ISBN 0-947478-47-7.
- Best, Martin S. "The Development of Commercial Aviation in China: Part 10A: China National Aviation Corporation 1945–1949". Air-Britain Archive, Spring 2010. pp. 19–36. ISSN 0262-4923.
- Creed, Roscoe. PBY: The Catalina Flying Boat. Annapolis, MD: US Naval Institute Press, 1986. ISBN 0-87021-526-4
- Crocker, Mel. Black Cats and Dumbos: WW II's Fighting PBYs. Crocker Media Expressions, 2002. ISBN 0-9712901-0-5
- Dorney, Louis B. US Navy PBY Catalina Units of the Pacific War. Botley, Oxford, UK: Osprey Publishing, 2007. ISBN 1-84176-911-8
- Hagedorn, Dan. 1993. Central American and Caribbean Air Forces. Air-Britain. ISBN 0-85130-210-6
- Hendrie, Andrew. Flying Cats: The Catalina Aircraft in World War II. Annapolis, MD: US Naval Institute Press, 1988. ISBN 0-87021-213-3
- Hoehn, John. (2011). Commando Kayak: The Australian Folboat, Pacific Campaign. hirschbooks.net & ozatwar.com/hoehn . ISBN 978-3-033-01717-7
- Kinzey, Bert. PBY Catalina in Detail & Scale. Carrollton, Texas: Squadron/Signal Publications, Inc., 2000. ISBN 1-888974-19-2
- Knott, Richard C. Black Cat Raiders of World War II. Annapolis, MD: US Naval Institute Press, 2000. ISBN 1-55750-471-7
- Kostenuk, S. and J. Griffin. RCAF Squadron Histories and Aircraft: 1924–1968. Toronto: Samuel Stevens, Hakkert & Company, 1977. ISBN 0-88866-577-6.
- Legg, David. Consolidated PBY Catalina: The Peacetime Record. Annapolis, MD: US Naval Institute Press, 2002. ISBN 1-55750-245-5
- Ragnarsson, Ragnar. US Navy PBY Catalina Units of the Atlantic War. Botley, Oxford, UK: Osprey Publishing, 2006. ISBN 1-84176-910-X
- Scarborough, William E. PBY Catalina in Action (Aircraft number 62). Carrollton, Texas: Squadron/Signal Publications, Inc., 1983. ISBN 0-89747-149-0
- Scarborough, William E. PBY Catalina - Walk Around. Carrollton, Texas: Squadron/Signal Publications, Inc., 1996. ISBN 0-89747-357-4
- Wagner, Ray. The Story of the PBY Catalina (Aero Biographies Volume 1). San Diego, California: Flight Classics, 1972.
- Petit, Jean-Jacques. Consolidated PBY-5A Catalina en France. 2013 - 56 p ISBN 978-2-9528167-5-5
