= Consolidated PBY Catalina in Australian service =

Consolidated PBY Catalina
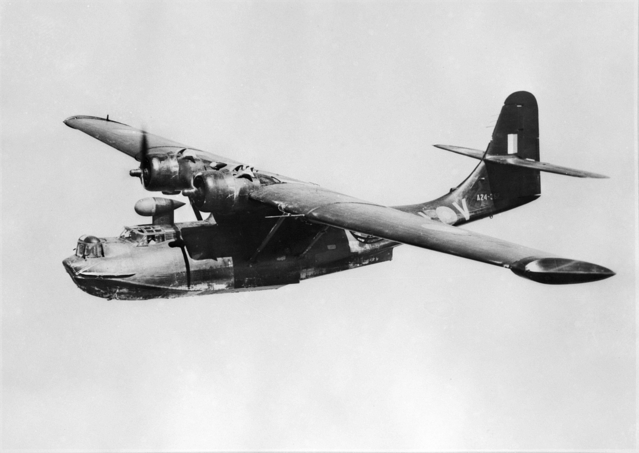
- A Royal Australian Air Force Boeing Canada-built PB2B-2 Catalina of No. 43 Squadron.

General information
- Type: Flying boat
- Manufacturer: Consolidated Aircraft
- Serial: A24-1 to A24-27, A24-30 to A24-68 (PBY-5), A24-28 and A24-29 (PBY-4), A24-69 to A24-114 (PBY-5A), A24-200 to A24-206 (PBY2B-1), A24-350 to A24-386 (PB2B-2)

History
- In service: 1941–1950

Developed as a naval patrol aircraft, the Consolidated PBY Catalina was a widely exported flying boat during World War II. Over the course of the conflict it served with a number of different nations in a variety of roles. In the Royal Australian Air Force, PBYs and PB2Bs (a variant built by Boeing in Canada) served as multi role bombers and scouts, the type eventually earning great renown among Australian aircrews. The motto of the Catalina squadrons was "The First and Furthest."

== Background ==
Originally designed by Consolidated Aircraft as a patrol bomber with a long operational range, the PBY was soon adapted to fill a multitude of roles. With war planners becoming increasingly conscious to the possibility of a future conflict in the Pacific Ocean, the U.S. Navy invested millions of dollars in the 1930s into developing flying boats. Flying boats had the advantage of not requiring runways, in effect leaving the entire ocean available for landing if weather conditions permitted. Several designs for flying boats were considered, with some being developed in small numbers, but the PBY was the most widely used and produced.

== Operational history ==
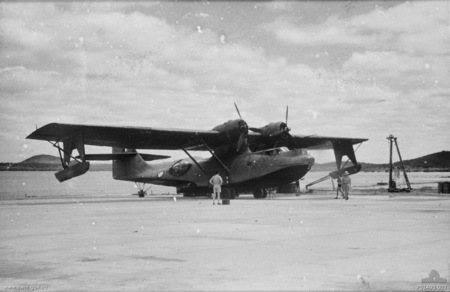
An RAAF Catalina of No. 11 Squadron landed on a beach awaiting maintenance in 1943.

The PBY Catalina was widely utilized by the Royal Australian Air Force in the Pacific Theater. In keeping with the trend set by the Royal Air Force, the aircraft was commonly known as the Catalina while in Australian service.

The Royal Australian Air Force ordered its first 18 PBY-5s in 1940, intending to use them for naval patrols. However, following the declaration of war on the Japanese Empire by the British Empire and its Commonwealth, the Catalinas were pressed into a number of different roles. The initial Japanese offensives in Southeast Asia were immensely successful, with the Fall of Singapore in February 1942 leading to the abandonment of the Singapore strategy and the adoption of a policy of general withdraw being enacted by the Australian armed forces. This turn of events isolated tens of thousands of Allied soldiers and civilians from Allied controlled territories. In response, RAAF Catalinas (among other aircraft) formed a rapid evacuation service from Java for hundreds of evacuees who were ferried to the port of Broome, Western Australia. During the last weeks of February 1942 more than 7000 people were successfully transported to Broome. Concerned with the evacuations and seeking to limit Allied bomber activity, the Japanese attacked Broome on 3 March 1942, destroying eight Catalinas along with 14 other aircraft. The attack led to a period referred to as the Western Australian emergency of March 1942, during which Catalinas were deployed to scout for a possible Japanese invasion force.

After the Fall of Rabaul in February 1942 the Catalina squadrons became the RAAF's only offensive weapon against the Japanese. They were soon attacking Japanese targets in Lae, Salamaua and Rabaul. On 27 June, each squadron contributed an aircraft to a four-hour raid over Lae and Salamaua during which, as well as bombs, the RAAF crews of No. 20 Squadron dropped empty beer bottles to disrupt the Japanese soldiers' sleep.

Catalinas had a reputation for being confused with the Japanese Kawanishi H6K flying boat. In one instance, a Catalina returning from a bombing mission was mistaken for a H6K by the pilot of a USN Grumman F4F Wildcat fighter and attacked. The American pilot later stated that the red markings of the standard RAF roundel (which was still used by the RAAF at that time) confused him into believing that the aircraft was Japanese. This incident led the RAAF to remove the red from the British roundel, and in doing so created the modern RAAF roundel.

The PBY Catalina was also employed by the RAAF as a long range bomber and mine-layer. The Catalinas excelled in the latter role, for while their low speed made them vulnerable to fighters, it also allowed them to accurately lay mines while flying. Four squadrons laid mines from April 1943 to July 1945 in the southwest Pacific. These operations blockaded ports and shipping routes. They also forced Japanese shipping into waters where American submarines were present. RAAF mining missions were often conducted at night to minimize the risk of interception and were hazardous, with some aircraft flying as low as 200 feet (61 m) above the surface to perform an accurate drop. These operations could last over 20 hours. In 1944 RAAF Catalinas flew missions to the Philippines and laid naval mines in Manila Bay to interdict the Japanese navy and prevent their intervention in the Battle of Mindoro. The motto of the crews who conducted these operations was "The First and the Furthest."

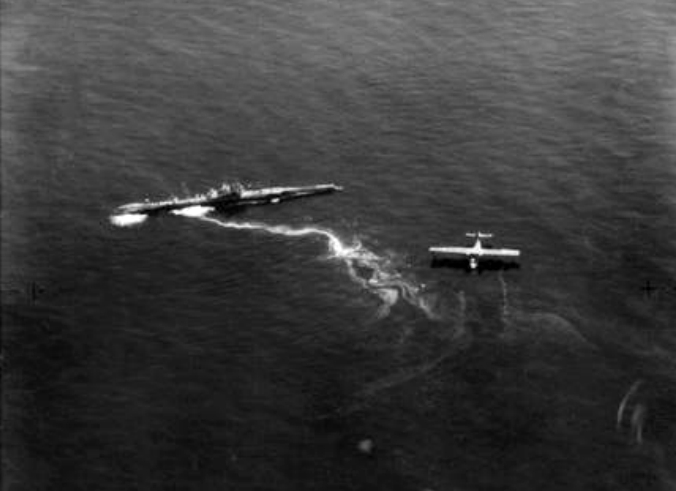
Aerial photo of a rendezvous between the British submarine HMS Telemachus and a Catalina of No. 112 Air Sea Rescue Flight RAAF in the Banda Sea, Netherlands East Indies, 23 March 1945. An engineer officer, injured in an accident, was transferred from the submarine to the Catalina by dinghy and flown to Darwin, Australia.

Taking advantage of the long range of the aircraft, the RAAF used the Catalina as a passenger and mail carrier during the war. The Fall of Singapore to the Japanese Army in 1942 cut Australia's air connection to Britain. To reestablish communications, an extreme range flight route was planned. Former Qantas Airlines pilots were employed to fly a 5,632-kilometre (3,500 mi) nonstop route from Perth to Ceylon in modified Catalinas, a route which was at that time the longest flight path in history without refuelling. The modified Catalinas had their crews reduced to three and were loaded with extra fuel and 69 kilograms (152 lb) of diplomatic and armed forces mail. Dubbed The Double Sunrise, these top secret flights remain the longest-duration nonstop commercial flights at 32 hours 9 minutes.

Like their American counterparts, Australian Catalinas were employed in search and rescue operations to recover downed aircrews.

Australian Catalinas also played an important role during the Pacific War in deploying Australian built military folboats (folding kayaks), namely the Hoehn MKIII. These were used for rescue, commando raids and reconnaissance operations because the Catalinas had the advantage of being able to easily approach remote coastal regions, then crew could erect these small craft on the large horizontal wing area and load the required gear, whether it be munitions, signal or aid equipment from the large hold.

Following the Surrender of Japan in September 1945, RAAF Catalinas were used to deliver medical supplies to liberated POW camps before flying survivors back to Australia. On 30 August 1945 a flight of 9 RAAF Catalinas landed in Singapore bearing medical supplies and documents in preparation for the Japanese surrender, becoming the first allied forces to enter the island since 1942, days before the commencement of Operation Tiderace. In total, Australia operated 168 Catalinas during the war.

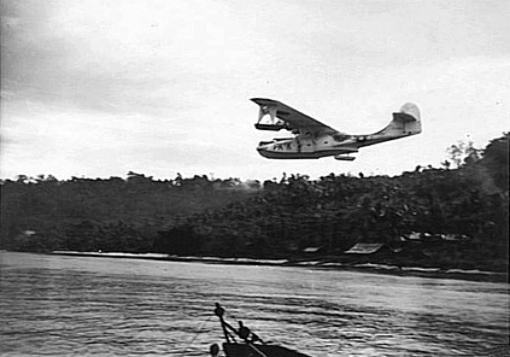
A Catalina preparing to land in Tol Anchorage. One of the advantages of flying boats such as the Catalina was the ability for them to land in isolated outposts too small for runways.

The aircraft continued to be used in immediate post-war period, being used to assist with the repatriation of former prisoners of war from Singapore to Australia. In 1948 No. 11 Squadron was still operating Catalinas for courier and search and rescue tasks. In April 1950 the last two aircraft were withdrawn from RAAF service.

=== RAAF PBY Catalina squadrons ===
- No. 11 Squadron RAAF
- No. 20 Squadron RAAF observation
- No. 40 Squadron RAAF had aircraft placed on establishment, but not actually issued.
- No. 42 Squadron RAAF
- No. 43 Squadron RAAF
- No. 6 Communication Unit RAAF
- No. 8 Communication Unit RAAF
- No. 111 Air-Sea Rescue Flight RAAF
- No. 112 Air-Sea Rescue Flight RAAF
- No. 113 Air-Sea Rescue Flight RAAF
- Seaplane Training Flight RAAF
- No. 3 Operational Training Unit RAAF
- Search and Rescue Wing RAAF

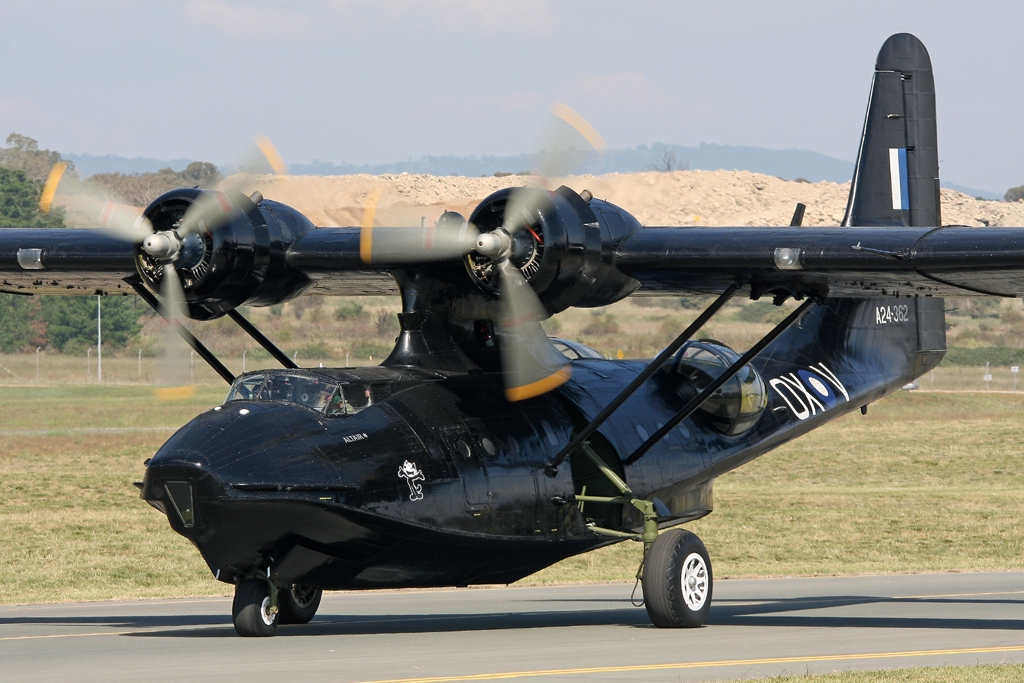
A restored Catalina in RAAF "Black Cat" livery. The black served to camouflage the Catalina during night operations.

== Legacy ==
The PBY Catalina remains an immensely popular aircraft in Australia. An Australian government website's stories section maintains that "The Catalina was to Australia what the Spitfire was to Britain." Qantas Airlines, the company that introduced the PBY to civilian service in Australia, pays tribute to the Catalinas on its website. An annual festival celebrating the Catalina and other Australian aircraft, the Rathmines Catalina Festival, is held in the town of Rathmines, New South Wales.

== Bibliography ==
- Courtney, G. B. (2002). Silent Feet: The History of 'Z' Special Operations1942-1945. Slouch Hat Publications. ISBN 0646129031.
- Gaunt, Coral; Cleworth, Robert (2000). Cats at War: Story of RAAF Catalinas in the Asia Pacific Theatre of War. Roseville, New South Wales: J.R. Cleworth. ISBN 978-1-86408-586-0.
- Gillison, Douglas (1962). Royal Australian Air Force 1939–1942. Australia in the War of 1939–1945. Series 3 – Air. Vol. 1. Canberra: Australian War Memorial. OCLC 2000369.
- Hoehn, J. W. (2011). Commando Kayak: The role of the Australian folboat in the Pacific War. Hirsch Publishing, Zürich, Switzerland. ISBN 9783033017177.
- Johnston, Mark (2011). Whispering Death: Australian Airmen in the Pacific War. Crows Nest, New South Wales: Allen & Unwin. ISBN 978-1-74175-901-3.
- Minty, Albert (1994). Black Cats: The Real Story of Australia's Long Range Catalina Strike Force in the Pacific War, Solomons to Singapore, Cairns to the Coast of China. Point Cook, Victoria: RAAF Museum. ISBN 9780642202895.
- Park, Keith (1946). Air Operations in South East Asia 3rd May 1945 to 12th September 1945 (PDF). London: War Office. published in "No. 39202". The London Gazette (Supplement). 13 April 1951. p. 2127.
- Wilson, Stewart (1994). Military Aircraft of Australia. Weston Creek, Australian Capital Territory: Aerospace Publications. ISBN 1875671080.
