= List of Royal Australian Air Force independent aircraft flights =

This is a list of independent Royal Australian Air Force aircraft flights. It includes flights which did not form part of a parent squadron and flying units of less than squadron status.

== Air ambulance units ==
- No. 1 Air Ambulance Unit RAAF
- No. 2 Air Ambulance Unit RAAF

== Air-sea rescue flights ==
- No. 111 Air-Sea Rescue Flight RAAF
- No. 112 Air-Sea Rescue Flight RAAF
- No. 113 Air-Sea Rescue Flight RAAF
- No. 114 Air-Sea Rescue Flight RAAF
- No. 115 Air-Sea Rescue Flight RAAF

== Air observation post flights ==
- No. 16 Air Observation Post Flight RAAF
- No. 17 Air Observation Post Flight RAAF

== Communication units ==
- No. 1 Communication Unit RAAF
- No. 2 Communication Unit RAAF
- No. 3 Communication Unit RAAF
- No. 4 Communication Unit RAAF
- No. 5 Communication Unit RAAF
- No. 6 Communication Unit RAAF
- No. 7 Communication Unit RAAF
- No. 8 Communication Unit RAAF
- No. 9 Communication Unit RAAF
- No. 10 Communication Unit RAAF
- No. 11 Communication Unit RAAF
- No. 12 Communication Unit RAAF
- No. 13 Communication Unit RAAF
- No. 30 Communication Unit RAAF

== Forward air control flights ==
- No. 4 Forward Air Control Flight RAAF
- Forward Air Control Development Unit RAAF

== Transport flights ==
- No. 9 Local Air Supply Unit RAAF
- No. 10 Local Air Supply Unit RAAF
- No. 12 Local Air Supply Unit RAAF
- No. 33 Flight RAAF
- No. 200 Flight RAAF
- Governor-General's Flight RAAF
- RAAF Special Transport Flight
- RAAF Transport Flight (Japan)
- RAAF Transport Flight Vietnam
- Transport Support Flight RAAF
- Transport Flight Butterworth RAAF

== Training flights ==
- No. 82 Wing Training Flight RAAF
- Lincoln Conversion Flight RAAF
- Sabre Advisory Flight RAAF
- RAAF Sabre Advisory Unit
- Seaplane Training Flight RAAF

== Miscellaneous flights ==
- No. 1 Long Range Flight RAAF
- No. 5 Flight RAAF
- No. 101 Flight RAAF
- No. 201 Flight RAAF
- Antarctic Flight RAAF
- Survey Flight RAAF
- Target Towing and Special Duties Flight RAAF
- RAAF Washington Flying Unit
