= No. 107 Squadron RAAF =

Royal Australian Air Force squadron

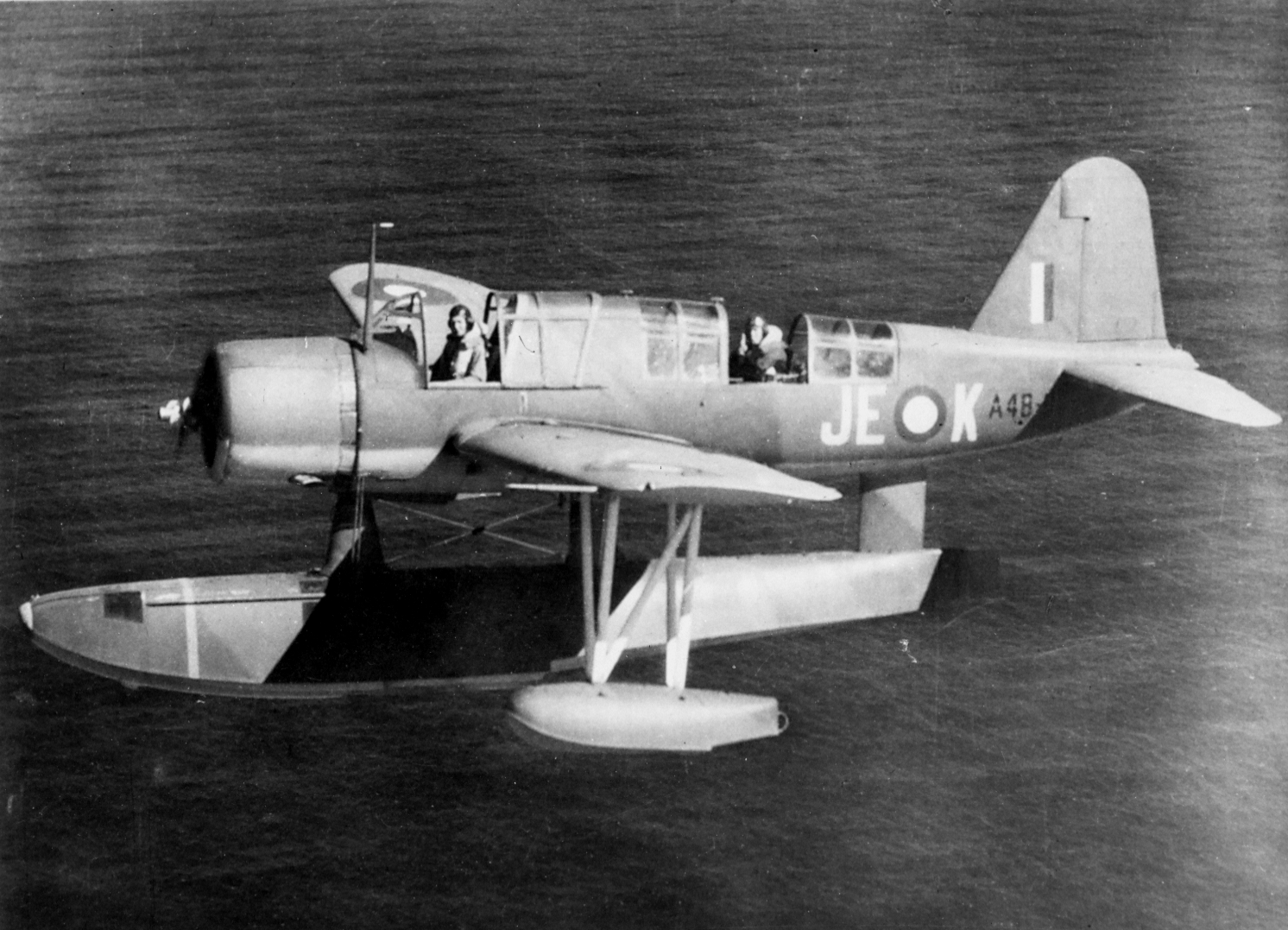
- A No. 107 Squadron OS2U Kingfisher
- Active: 1943–1945
- Country: Australia
- Branch: Royal Australian Air Force
- Role: Maritime patrol
- Engagements: World War II: Axis naval activity in Australian waters

Insignia
- Squadron code: JE

Aircraft flown
- Patrol: Vought OS2U Kingfisher (1943–1945)

No. 107 Squadron was a Royal Australian Air Force maritime patrol squadron of World War II. It was formed in May 1943 and was equipped with Vought OS2U Kingfisher aircraft. The squadron conducted anti-submarine patrols off the Australian east coast during the last years of the war, but did not encounter any enemy submarines. It was disbanded in October 1945.

== History ==
No. 107 Squadron was formed on 10 May 1943 at RAAF Station Rathmines, New South Wales. The squadron was equipped with 15 Vought OS2U Kingfisher aircraft which had been ordered by the Netherlands East Indies (NEI) Naval Service but delivered to Australia following the Japanese conquest of the NEI. These aircraft had previously been used by the Seaplane Training Flight and No. 3 Operational Training Unit for training purposes. The squadron's first commanding officer was Flying Officer N.J. Lennon.

As soon as it was formed, No. 107 Squadron began conducting anti-submarine and convoy escort patrols. Detachments of Consolidated PBY Catalinas from No. 11 Squadron and No. 20 Squadron were briefly attached to the squadron during June and September–October 1943. One of the squadron's Kingfishers was lost as a result of damage sustained by an in flight cockpit fire on 22 September 1943, but both its crewmen survived after they made an emergency landing in the sea off Pittwater.

In mid-1944 it was decided to transfer No. 107 Squadron from Rathmines, which had become crowded, to St Georges Basin to the south of Sydney. The squadron began moving south on 1 July 1944, but this process was delayed by bad weather. The facilities at St Georges Basin were greatly inferior to those at Rathmines, and hot water and ablution facilities were not initially available. No. 107 Squadron resumed its routine shipping protection patrols from St Georges Basin on 7 July.

No. 107 Squadron's patrols were intensified after the German submarine U-862 sank the American Liberty Ship Robert J. Walker off Moruya on 25 December 1944. The squadron flew five sorties a day for the next week in search of the submarine. On 29 December one of the squadron's Kingfishers attacked what its pilot believed was a submarine periscope near the point at which Robert J. Walker had been sunk. However, by this time U-862 was in the Tasman Sea near New Zealand. This was the only deliberate attack made by a RAAF Kingfisher during the war.

During early 1945 No. 107 Squadron's duties were expanded to include providing search and rescue support for elements of the British Pacific Fleet as they passed along the Australian east coast. The number of anti-submarine patrols was also decreased in early 1945 as the threat of attack had greatly diminished. Following the end of the war, No. 107 Squadron ferried its Kingfishers to the RAAF's Flying Boat Repair Depot at Lake Boga, Victoria, during August 1945; the last Kingfishers departed St Georges Basin on the 29th of the month. The squadron was disbanded at St Georges Basin on 28 October 1945.
