= No. 41 Squadron RAAF =

Royal Australian Air Force squadron

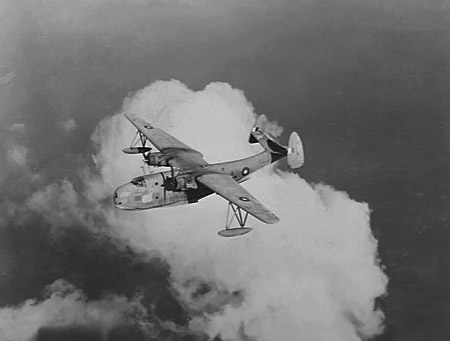
- A No. 41 Squadron Martin Mariner in 1944
- Active: 1942–1945
- Country: Australia
- Branch: Royal Australian Air Force
- Role: Transport
- Engagements: World War II

Insignia
- Squadron code: DQ (Jan 1943 – Sep 1944)

Aircraft flown
- Transport: Empire, Do 24, Mariner

No. 41 Squadron was a Royal Australian Air Force (RAAF) transport squadron of World War II. It was formed in August 1942 and operated flying boats in the South West Pacific area. The squadron was disbanded in September 1945.

== History ==
No. 41 Squadron was formed from 'A' Flight of No. 33 Squadron at Townsville, Queensland on 21 August 1942. It was initially equipped with two ex-Qantas Short Empire flying boats and flew its first transport flights on the day it was established. The unit was later allocated two Dornier Do 24 flying boats.

The squadron's main task throughout the war was to conduct regular transport flights between towns in northern Australia and Allied military bases in New Guinea. Regular destinations included Bowen, Brisbane, Cairns, Darwin and Karumba in Australia and Finschhafen, Goodenough Island, Hollandia, Los Negros, Madang, Milne Bay, Port Moresby, Salamaua in New Guinea. The squadron also had a large maritime section and performed a number of air-sea rescues. During its existence the squadron's boats and aircraft rescued more than 150 people.

In June 1943 No. 41 Squadron had a strength of three Empires and two Do 24s, but the Empires were returned to Qantas in July that year. The Do 24s were in poor mechanical condition and serviceability rates were constantly low. Martin Mariners supplemented the Do 24s from February 1944 and these larger and more reliable aircraft became the squadron's only aircraft from May. The squadron moved to RAAF Base Rathmines on 11 May 1944 but maintained detachments at Townsville and at Rose Bay in Sydney. It moved again to Cairns on 2 July and added longer flights to Nouméa, Espiritu Santo and other islands to its routes.

The squadron was originally scheduled to be disbanded on 10 June 1945, but it was decided to maintain it. Some personnel were posted to No. 114 Air-Sea Rescue Flight, however. During June the squadron continued to fly a daily service to Madang, a bi-weekly service to Brisbane and occasional flights to Merauke and Darwin. No. 41 Squadron was officially disbanded on 27 September 1945.
