= No. 83 Wing RAAF =

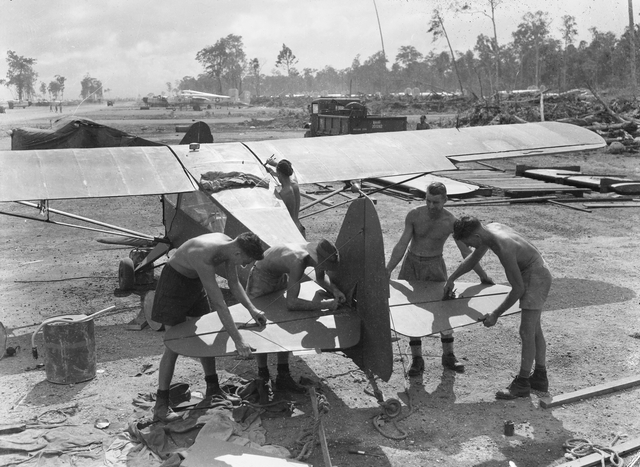
- A No. 16 Air Observation Post Auster being assembled at Morotai in April 1945
- Active: 1944–1947
- Country: Australia
- Branch: Royal Australian Air Force
- Role: Army cooperation
- Engagements: World War II: Borneo campaign

No. 83 Wing was a unit of the Royal Australian Air Force during World War II. The wing was formed in September 1944 and was one of the RAAF's two such units tasked with army cooperation. It took part in the Borneo campaign from May 1945 until the end of the war to support the Army's I Corps. No. 83 Wing was disbanded in July 1947.

== History ==
No. 83 Wing was raised at Nadzab in the Territory of New Guinea on 25 September 1944. It was one of two army cooperation wings established by the RAAF, the other being No. 84 Wing, which was formed in Cairns on 11 September 1944. Each wing was made up of a tactical reconnaissance squadron, a local air supply unit and an air observation post flight.

The two army cooperation wings were tasked with supporting units of the Australian Army. Their duties included reconnaissance, artillery spotting, directing attack aircraft to targets, transporting supplies and spraying anti-malarial chemicals. They were not authorised to conduct offensive operations, but their aircraft were permitted to attack targets of opportunity.

No. 83 Wing was transferred to Lae on 13 November 1944. It was subsequently deployed to Morotai in the Netherlands East Indies, arriving there on 4 April 1945. The movement to Morotai formed part of a broader transfer of the Australian First Tactical Air Force to take part on the Borneo campaign, the wing forming part of No. 1 TAF. At this time No. 83 Wing included No. 4 Squadron, which flew CAC Boomerang and CAC Wirraway aircraft, No. 16 Air Observation Post Flight with Taylorcraft Austers and No. 9 Local Air Supply Unit which operated Bristol Beauforts.

Four of No. 16 Air Observation Post Flight's Auster aircraft were landed at Tarakan early in the invasion of the island in early May 1945. One of these aircraft crashed on takeoff from Tarakan during 2 May, killing its pilot; this was the flight's only fatality during the campaign. Detachments from No. 16 Air Observation Post Flight supported the 9th Division's operations in North Borneo from June and the 7th Division's landing at Balikpapan during July. No. 4 Squadron also took part in these operations. Its Wirraways were sent to North Borneo, and began operating from Labuan from 23 June. The Boomerangs supported the 7th Division at Balikpapan. The wing headquarters was transferred from Morotai to Labuan, and began operating from there on 12 June. No. 9 Local Supply Unit's Beauforts supported operations in North Borneo by spraying DDT over the areas Australian Army units were operating. A Beaufort crashed while taking off for one of these sorties on 11 June, with all three of its aircrew being killed. Following the Japanese surrender, No. 83 Wing's aircraft were used to locate Allied prisoners of war in Borneo, among other tasks.

The wing headquarters was transferred to Canberra, and opened there on 22 January 1946. Nos. 4 Squadron and 16 Air Observation Post Flight were also stationed at Canberra at this time. Both units, along with No. 383 Base Squadron, were assigned to No. 83 Wing. The wing may have been designated Army Co-Operation Wing for part of its period at Canberra. No. 83 Wing was disbanded in Canberra on 8 July 1947.
