= No. 16 Air Observation Post Flight RAAF =

No. 16 Air Observation Post Flight
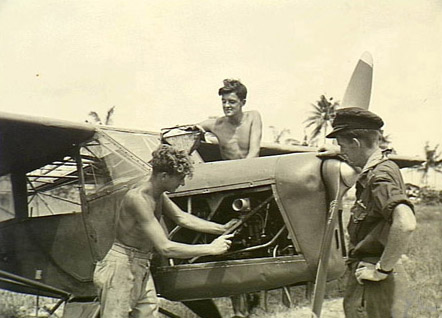
- No. 16 AOP Flight groundcrew working on an aircraft prior to an artillery spotting flight in July 1945
- Active: 1944–1947, 1958–1960
- Country: Australia
- Branch: Royal Australian Air Force
- Type: Army liaison
- Engagements: World War II: New Guinea campaign; Borneo campaign

Insignia
- Squadron code: NF

Aircraft flown
- Reconnaissance: Auster (1944–1947, 1958–1959); Cessna 180 (1959–1960)

No. 16 Air Observation Post Flight (No. 16 AOP Flight) was a Royal Australian Air Force (RAAF) unit that saw action in World War II supporting Australian Army operations. It was formed in October 1944 and disbanded in June 1947. The flight was reestablished in September 1958, and was disbanded again in December 1960, when its responsibilities were transferred to a joint Army-RAAF unit.

== History ==
No. 16 Air Observation Post Flight was formed at Lae in New Guinea on 20 October 1944. At the time it was established it had a strength of four pilots and was equipped with Taylorcraft Auster light aircraft. These aircraft were among the 56 Austers that the RAAF eventually ordered. The first batch was ordered in 1944 to equip Nos. 16 and 17 AOP Flights. No. 16 AOP Flight was initially assigned to the headquarters of the First Army, and conducted a mix of training and operational flights from Lae during late 1944 and early 1945. The operational missions included flying supplies and personnel to Army units fighting the Japanese, evacuating wounded soldiers and conducting reconnaissance tasks. The flight established at detachment at Tadji on 30 January 1945 to support the Army's 17th Brigade during the Aitape–Wewak campaign.

On 28 March 1945, No. 16 Flight departed for Morotai in the Netherlands East Indies with its parent unit, No. 83 (Army Cooperation) Wing, in preparation for the Borneo campaign; it arrived at Morotai on 4 April. A detachment of the flight took part in the landing at Tarakan on 1 May. The next day an Auster crashed while taking off from a newly constructed small airstrip within the Allied beachhead, resulting in the death of the aircraft's observer, an Army Air Liaison Officer, Lieutenant Stanley Ket. Another No. 16 AOP Flight detachment landed on Labuan island on 10 June, and subsequently supported the 9th Division throughout the Battle of North Borneo. During late June aircraft from this detachment rescued eleven downed American airmen from a valley central Borneo. On 1 July the detachment at Tarakan ceased operations, and embarked to take part in the landing at Balikpapan. From 3 July until the end of the war this detachment supported the 7th Division.

Following the Japanese surrender ceremony in Tokyo Bay, No. 16 AOP Flight flew air cover over HMAS Burdekin while the official surrender of Dutch Borneo was signed on board the ship on 10 September. Other Austers from the flight escorted a Japanese aircraft to Labuan. No. 16 AOP Flight was ordered to cease flying operations on 6 November 1945, and it returned to Australia by sea later that month. A nucleus from the flight arrived at RAAF Station Canberra on 3 December, and flying operations resumed there on 3 January 1946. No. 16 AOP Flight was disbanded on 23 June 1947.

The flight was re-formed at Canberra on 25 September 1958 with the role of providing training to Army officers. It was equipped with World War II-vintage Austers until new Cessna 180 light aircraft were delivered in July 1959. In addition to its training role, No. 16 AOP Flight was occasionally used to support the Australian Capital Territory Police Force and conduct aerial photography for the Commonwealth Scientific and Industrial Research Organisation. In August 1960 it was announced that the flight would be expanded to squadron strength and also begin to operate Bell 47G Sioux helicopters. On 1 December 1960 No. 16 Army Light Aircraft Squadron was formed as a joint Army and RAAF unit at RAAF Base Amberley in Queensland, and No. 16 AOP Flight was disbanded at Canberra on the 20th of the month. This squadron was expanded to become the Army's 1st Aviation Regiment in April 1966.
