= RAAF Base Rathmines =

Former RAAF WWII seaplane base

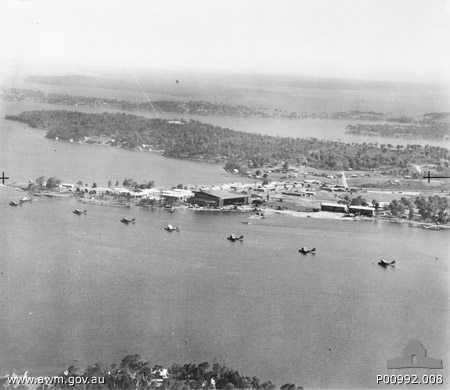
- RAAF Rathmines showing the hangars on the shore and the Catalina aircraft moored in the lake, 1945

- Location within New South Wales Location within Australia
- 33.0393°S 151.5921°E
- Location: Dorrington Road, Rathmines, City of Lake Macquarie, New South Wales, Australia

History
- Founded: 1939
- Built for: Royal Australian Air Force

Site notes
- Owner: Australian Christadelphian Bible School; Disability Life Enrichment; Don Geddes Nursing Home; Lake Macquarie City Council

New South Wales Heritage Register
- Official name: Rathmines Park, former RAAF Seaplane Base; RAAF Base Rathmines; Seaplane Base; flying boat base; Rathmines Aerodrome; Catalina Base
- Type: state heritage (complex / group)
- Designated: 25 November 2005
- Reference no.: 1740
- Type: Defence Base Air Force (Flying boats)
- Category: Defence

RAAF Base Rathmines is a heritage-listed former RAAF Second World War seaplane base and now used as community venues, sports venues and a visitor attraction at Dorrington Road, Rathmines, City of Lake Macquarie, New South Wales, Australia. It was in use as an RAAF base from 1939 to 1961. It is also known as Rathmines Park, former RAAF Seaplane Base, Flying Boat Base, Rathmines Aerodrome and Catalina Base. The property is owned by Australian Christadelphian Bible School, Disability Life Enrichment, Don Geddes Nursing Home and Lake Macquarie City Council. The remains of the former air base was added to the New South Wales State Heritage Register on 25 November 2005.

RAAF Base Rathmines was established in 1939 and was the RAAF's main flying boat base during the Second World War and the early 1950s. During the war, aircraft based at Rathmines conducted anti-submarine patrols along the Australian east coast and the base was home to the RAAF's main seaplane training units. In addition, detachments from squadrons based at Rathmines flew numerous offensive mine laying missions into Japanese-held territory (due to Rathmines' distance from the front line, these aircraft staged through bases in Northern Australia when travelling to and from their targets). Rathmines was also the RAAF Maritime Section's main training base.

== History ==
The Awabakal were the first peoples of Lake Macquarie. Awaba is the Aboriginal name for the region and Ninkinbah was the Aboriginal name for Lake Macquarie. There are several sites within Rathmines Park that demonstrate Aboriginal use of the area and provide local Aboriginal people with a tangible link to past land use practices.

Early European settlement around Rathmines took place in the 1840s with the name of Rathmines derived from the Hely family that came from a town named Rathmines, located near Dublin, Ireland. The Hely family built a homestead and farmed a significant portion of the land that now makes up Rathmines Park.

The Rathmines site on the shores of Lake Macquarie was identified as a possible place for a flying boat base in 1936, when the Director of Duties, RAAF HQ Victoria Barracks, Melbourne, gave instructions to investigate and recommend a site for a flying boat base in the Newcastle region. A ground and water survey of the bay and inlet was undertaken, and while the Rathmines site was the second recommendation, it was considered as the most likely site, and was chosen to be the site.

During July 1938, No 5 Squadron from RAAF Base Richmond was sent to investigate landing areas and sites around the Lake Macquarie area for the establishment of the Rathmines Base and the eventual move of the squadron. On 1 January 1939, the No 5 Squadron was renamed No 9 (Fleet Cooperation) Squadron. Further surveys of the area were made in August 1939 and, in September, camp was set up, and arrangements were made to rent local cottages as living quarters. The base became operational when the No 9 Squadron transferred from RAAF Point Cook, Victoria, to Rathmines, with Seagull flying boats. Catalina flying boats arrived at the base in February 1941 and, by September 1943, the base comprised 14 Catalinas, two Seagulls, a Dornier and a Dolphin. During training, many personnel brought their families to live in the towns and villages near the Rathmines Base which influenced the establishment of other services such a school and post office.

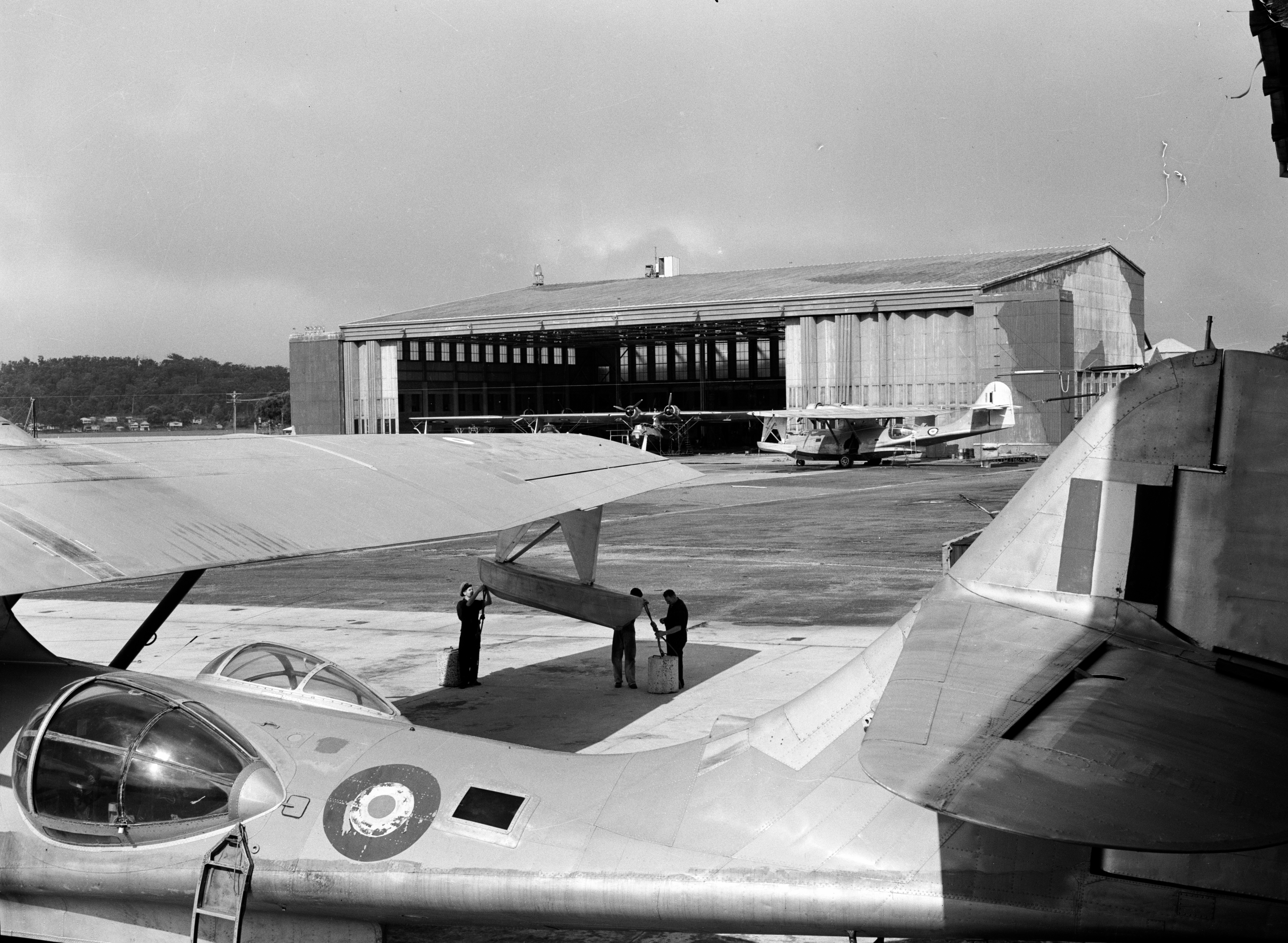
Seaplanes at RAAF base at Rathmines on Lake Macquarie, 1941-43

Rathmines was an important base for the Catalina flying boats and their squadrons, which played a significant role in Australia's RAAF defensive operations during the Second World War. The RAAF operated 168 between 1941 and 1950, flown by four front line squadrons, two communications units and three air-sea rescue flights during the war. The Catalina flying boats were the only aircraft to see service with the RAAF for the total wartime operations against Japan.

Catalina operations included reconnaissance bombing, mine laying, supplying troops, coast watches and air-sea rescue missions. RAAF Catalinas were famous for their precision laying of mines in enemy water ways and harbours. The Catalina flying boat was one of the durable and effective aircraft of the war, due to their range, endurance and good load carrying capacity. Consequently, they were used by almost all the Allied services including the Royal Air Force and RAAF. Although it was one of the slowest combat aircraft of the war, it outsold all the newer, faster and better-equipped replacements of other manufacturers. Flying boats such as the Catalina placed a special demand on training air crews who not only learnt to fly the aircraft but needed to learn manoeuvres in sea conditions which was usually associated with naval operations. The famous Black Cats were used on covert night operations mine laying just about every enemy port in the South West Pacific Area, operations extending as far as the Chinese coast. During these operations, 322 aircrew were lost.

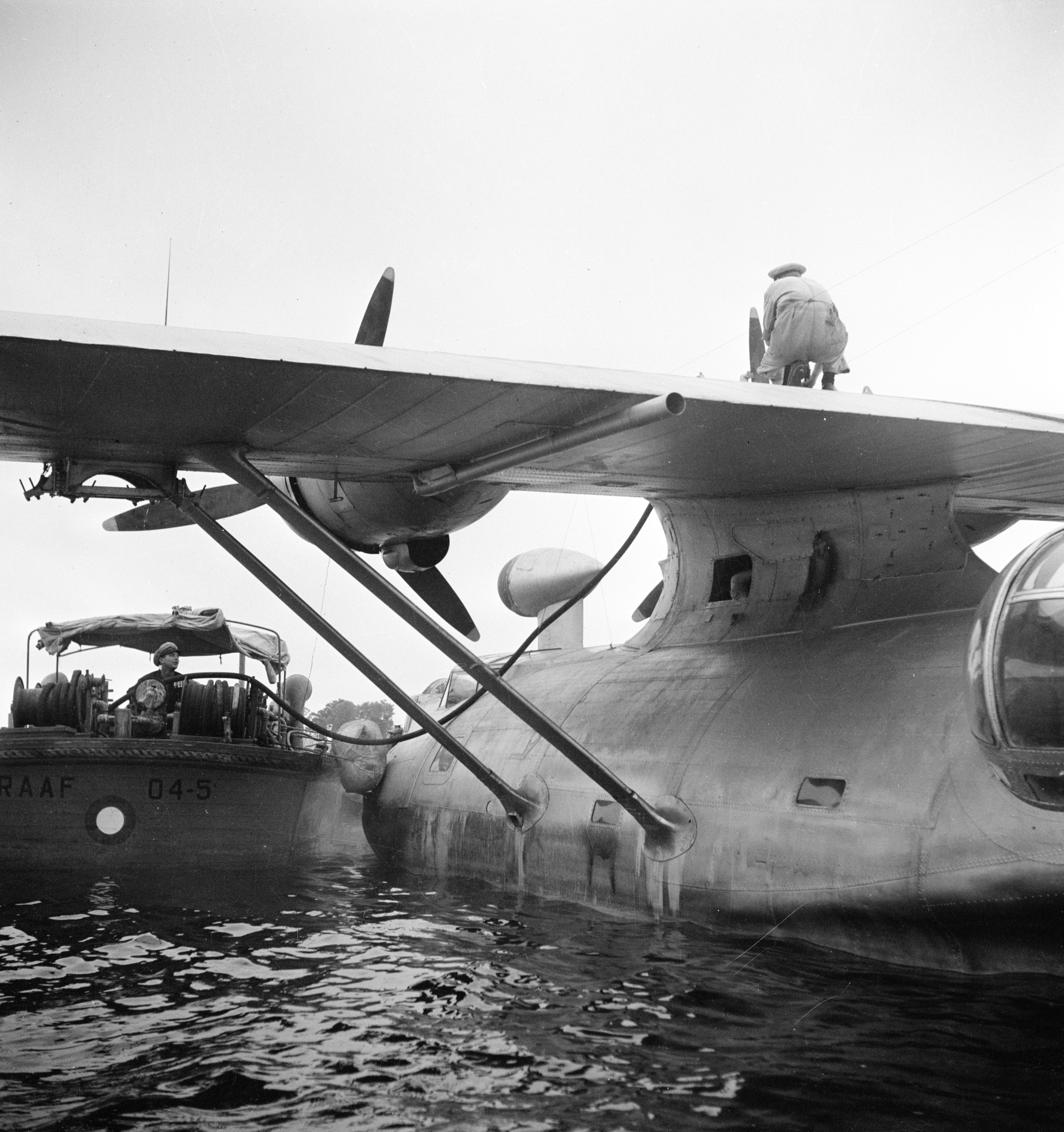
Refueling a PBY Catalina seaplane at RAAF base at Rathmines on Lake Macquarie, 1941-43

Catalinas and air crews from Rathmines were involved in the defence of Australia in war events such as the Battle of the Coral Sea. In 1942, a Japanese taskforce bound for Port Moresby was located and followed by Catalina aircraft. The extensive duration of the Catalina enabled the aircraft to remain in contact with the Japanese force and call in the navy. Reports transmitted from the aircraft allowed American and Australian navies to intercept the Japanese force, resulting in the Battle of the Coral Sea. Flying boats from Rathmines were a part of this battle, which ended with the Japanese forced to withdraw from Australian waters, effectively ending the immediate threat of a Japanese invasion of the Australian mainland.

The base was also involved with the mining of Manila Harbour, which involved 24 RAAF Catalinas, eight of which were from No 11 Squadron aircraft which originated from Rathmines.

The Rathmines Base was an important flying boat crew training facility for the war. The base housed the Operational Training Unit for Catalina aircrew. During the 1940s, crews for No.s 9, 10, 11 Squadrons trained at Rathmines, with a total of over 200 Catalina air crews trained at the base. The base also provided a Flying Boat Repair Depot and a Marine Section Repair Depot. New flying boats were made in the US, and were then converted at Rathmines for operational duties.

The base reached its peak strength of almost 3,000 officers and other ranks in 1944–45, and was the largest flying boat base in Australia.

Many wartime heroes served at Rathmines including squadron commanders Group Captain Attire Wearne DSO DFC, Air Commodore W. Keith Bolitho DFC DFC (US), Wing Commander Dick Atkinson DSO DFC, Wing Commander Gordon Stilling DFC, Squadron Leader Lin Hurt DFC and Wing Commander G.U. "Scottie" Allan.

After the RAAF retired its flying boats in 1952 RAAF Base Rathmines was used as a ground-training base for, among others, officers, senior non-commissioned officers, physical training instructors, national servicemen and recruits until being closed in 1960/61. When the base closed, a large hangar, complete with electrically operated doors and used for servicing seaplanes, was pulled down and half of the very high building shipped to RAAF Base Richmond to house the RAAF's then-new C-130 Hercules aircraft.

Flying units based at RAAF Rathmines at different times included:

- No. 9 Squadron
- No. 11 Squadron
- No. 20 Squadron
- No. 40 Squadron
- No. 41 Squadron
- No. 43 Squadron
- No. 107 Squadron
- No. 3 Operational Training Unit
- Seaplane Training Flight
- Search and Rescue Wing

== Description ==
The Rathmines RAAF Base is on the western shore of Lake Macquarie. The design and construction of the base at the beginning of the Second War resulted in a geometric layout of structures over the site which reflect its use for military purposes.

When the base closed in 1956, there were more than 230 buildings and structures on site. In 1997, ten remained:

- The officers mess, adapted for use as the Rathmines Bowling Clubhouse
- Part of the north-east hangar, adapted for use as the Christadelphian School
- The inflammable liquids store, adapted for use as the Scout Hall
- Substation No.2, now empty and not in regular use
- The airmen's ablution building, adapted for use as Rathmines Catamaran Clubhouse
- The picture theatre and gymnasium building, adapted for use as Rathmines Community Hall
- The central boiler house, now stripped and used as a store
- The emergency power house, now stripped and used as a store
- The sergeants mess, adapted for use as Westlakes Music Centre
- The base hospital and facilities, now owned and operated by Disability Life Enrichment Ltd and incorporating the Catalina Conference Centre.

In 1997, the former picture theatre and gymnasium was the most intact of all the surviving structures and had the most original fabric. It was one of the base's largest, most important buildings. The cinema hall is the largest in volume with a stage flanked by dressing rooms at the north-east end. Beyond is the former gymnasium, though it has been altered and subdivided.

Other structures also on the site in 1997, many altered or adapted, include:

- A concrete stormwater channel
- The bomb and fuel wharf, partly rebuilt
- Part of the Marine Section timber wharf, now rebuilt as the "F" wharf
- The jetty and slipway complex at Styles Point
- The concrete apron area
- The bitumen hardstanding
- The parade ground
- The first septic tank installation
- The second septic tank installation

In 1997, there were also many remains of structures on site, including:

- The pump house and duty pilots tower
- The general stores building
- The celestial trainer
- The aircraft stores
- The motor transport building
- The parade ground saluting base
- The central ironing room and laundry
- A remnant of the south boundary fence
- The battery room
- The western hangars

=== Condition ===
In 1997, there was a significant amount of remaining physical evidence from the war time use of the Rathmines Base. The elements which remained varied in condition. Some have been largely altered and adapted for new uses, and some are in disrepair.

There are two Aboriginal Artifact Scatters (one scatter and one isolated find) and a midden recorded within the area.

=== Modifications and dates ===
Following sale in 1962, several structures were leased: picture theatre and gymnasium for Rathmines Community Hall; flammable liquids store for Scout Hall; airmen's ablution block for Sailing Club; officers' mess for Rathmines Bowling Club; sergeants' hall for Westlake Music Centre. The base hospital was sold to private interests and the workshops to a Bible School. Many buildings were also sold and removed.

The Catalina Memorial was constructed on the site in 1972.

== Heritage listing ==
The Rathmines RAAF seaplane base played a pivotal role in the defence of Australia in World War II. It was the largest seaplane base in the Southern Hemisphere and was the longest serving during the war effort. It is the most intact example of an RAAF WWII seaplane base in Australia.

Rathmines RAAF Base is significant as a flying boat base used for the defence of Australia in World War II. During WWII, it was a major boat base in NSW, and was the largest boat base in Australia. It is understood to be the only flying boat base in NSW with a significant amount of physical fabric remaining.

The Rathmines RAAF Base is important through its use as a base for the seaplanes used in WWII, particularly the Catalina flying boat, which had the ability to land and take off in calm water, and had great endurance over long distances. The Catalina was one of the most successful flying boats produced and its qualities made the aircraft important in the defense of Australia during WWII.

The Rathmines RAAF base is significant as it was a centre for training, housing the Operational Training Unit for Catalina crew and providing training to over 200 Catalina crews during the war. The Base was also important as a repair centre for the flying boats and was the location of a Flying Boat Repair Depot.

The Rathmines RAAF Base is significant through its association with specific WWII events. The Base's flying boats were involved with the mining of Manilla Harbour, and played an important part in the Battle of the Coral Sea.

The Base has continuing social significance to WWII service personnel, and to the community of Lake Macquarie, who recognise the site's history and continue to use the site, creating an evolving landscape which retains significant elements of the RAAF Base.

It had a dramatic impact on the housing and road development within the area

Rathmines Park, former RAAF Seaplane Base was listed on the New South Wales State Heritage Register on 25 November 2005 having satisfied the following criteria.

The place is important in demonstrating the course, or pattern, of cultural or natural history in New South Wales.

The Rathmines RAAF seaplane base is of state significance played a pivotal role in the defence of Australia in World War II and is therefore of great importance in the pattern of NSW's cultural history.

The place has a strong or special association with a person, or group of persons, of importance of cultural or natural history of New South Wales's history.

The Rathmines RAAF Seaplane Base is of State and Local significance for its strong and special associations with service personnel that served at the Base during and after World War II.

The place is important in demonstrating aesthetic characteristics and/or a high degree of creative or technical achievement in New South Wales.

The surviving buildings and remnant structures are of state significance for the ability to demonstrate the large scale, configuration and function of the RAAF seaplane base as a military establishment. The remnant fabric coupled with open clearings and sitting along on the banks of Lake Macquarie demonstrates the important relationship between the seaplanes and the water. It is an aesthetically distinctive landscape which has landmark qualities. The Rathmines RAAF Base has significant association with technical innovations and capabilities of the Catalina flying boats that made significant contributions to the defence of Australia during WWII.

The place has strong or special association with a particular community or cultural group in New South Wales for social, cultural or spiritual reasons.

The Rathmines RAAF Base is held in high esteem by the local community, ex-service personnel and Catalina aviator enthusiasts. The site is of significance to the Awabakal Peoples of the local area.

The place has potential to yield information that will contribute to an understanding of the cultural or natural history of New South Wales.

Remnant above ground and sub-surface fabric may have state significance for their potential to yield further information as a source of physical evidence to interpret the range of operations of a large defence seaplane base during WWII. The scale of the surviving evidence makes it an important benchmark for such sites. The site also contains two Aboriginal Artifact Scatter sites and a midden area that has potential to yield further cultural information about the Awabakal Peoples of the area.

The place possesses uncommon, rare or endangered aspects of the cultural or natural history of New South Wales.

The Rathmines RAAF Base was the major WWII boat base in NSW, and is the only known example in NSW with surviving fabric.

The place is important in demonstrating the principal characteristics of a class of cultural or natural places/environments in New South Wales.

The Rathmines RAAF Base is rare and of state significance as a major WWII seaplane base in NSW, and is the only known example in NSW of its type.

== See also ==
Lake Boga Flying Boat Base
