= No. 17 Air Observation Post Flight RAAF =

No. 17 Air Observation Post Flight
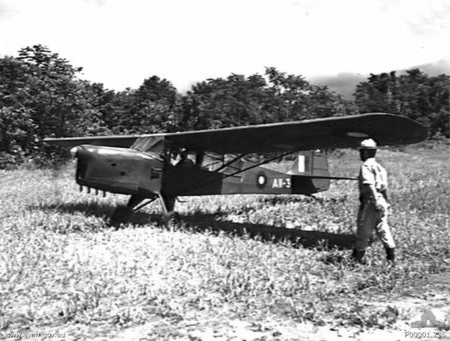
- A 17 AOP Flight Auster at Bougainville Island in 1945
- Active: 1944–1945
- Country: Australia
- Branch: Royal Australian Air Force
- Type: Army liaison
- Engagements: World War II: Bougainville campaign; New Britain campaign; Aitape–Wewak campaign

Insignia
- Squadron code: KV

Aircraft flown
- Reconnaissance: Auster (1944–1945); Tiger Moth (1945)

No. 17 Air Observation Post Flight (No. 17 AOP Flight) was a Royal Australian Air Force artillery-spotting and liaison unit which saw action as part of the Bougainville campaign and New Britain campaign in World War II. The flight was established in October 1944 and disbanded in December the next year.

== History ==
No. 17 AOP Flight was formed at Cairns on 2 October 1944. It was equipped with seven Taylorcraft Auster light aircraft, the first of which was delivered to the unit on 22 October. These aircraft were among the 56 Austers the RAAF had ordered in 1944 to equip Nos. 16 and 17 AOP Flights. The flight formed part of No. 84 (Army Cooperation) Wing, along with No. 5 Squadron, which was equipped with CAC Boomerang and CAC Wirraway aircraft, and the Bristol Beaufort-equipped No. 10 Local Air Supply Unit.

The flight began moving from Cairns to Bougainville in late October 1944, with its main party arriving on the island on 14 December 1944. Some operational flying was conducted in December, but all of No. 17 AOP Flight's aircraft had to be grounded on the 31st of the month as their fabric airframes had been damaged by the tropical conditions. The necessary repairs included replacing some of the Austers fabric sections and perspex windows, but the process of shipping these items to Bougainville proved slow. As a result, the unit was inactive until the first aircraft to be repaired returned to service on 1 February 1945. A detachment of No. 17 AOP Flight was established on 14 February at Cape Hoskins on the island of New Britain to support the Australian Army units engaged there; this detachment comprised two officers and eight airmen, and was subsequently equipped with de Havilland Tiger Moth aircraft.

From February 1945 the main body of No. 17 AOP Flight supported the advance conducted by the Australian Army's II Corps against Japanese positions on Bougainville. The Austers were used for reconnaissance, artillery spotting and supply dropping as well as evacuating wounded personnel, and proved successful in these roles. By June 1945 No. 17 AOP Flight had conducted 1,328 sorties on Bougainville, though shortages of supplies and pilots hindered the operations of the unit and the other elements of No. 84 Wing. The flight worked closely with infantry and armoured units, and its aircraft were called "the eyes of the battalion commanders" by George Odgers in the official history of the RAAF in World War II. In April 1945 another detachment of the No. 17 AOP Flight was established at Tadji on the mainland of New Guinea to evacuate soldiers wounded during fighting in the Aitape–Wewak campaign; by the time of the Japanese surrender it had conducted 255 evacuation flights.

Following the end of the war No. 17 AOP Flight was disbanded on 7 December 1945.
