= No. 10 Local Air Supply Unit RAAF =

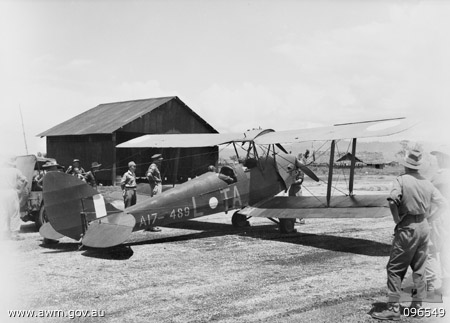
A No. 10 Local Air Supply Unit Tiger Moth aircraft following the Japanese surrender

No. 10 Local Air Supply Unit was a Royal Australian Air Force air transport unit of World War II. No. 84 (Army Cooperation) Wing was formed on 11 September 1944 in Cairns, Queensland. Commanded by Group Captain Bill Hely, it comprised No. 5 (Tactical Reconnaissance) Squadron, No. 17 Air Observation Post (AOP) Flight, No. 10 Communication Unit, and No. 39 Operational Base Unit. The wing arrived at Torokina in October to begin supporting Australian troops during the Bougainville Campaign. 10 Communications Unit flew Avro Ansons and Bristol Beauforts on courier, reconnaissance, supply, and anti-malarial spraying missions; it was renamed No. 10 Local Air Supply Unit RAAF in March 1945. The Unit was also formed at Aitape, New Guinea on 18 April 1945 to undertake the local air supply of Australian Army units in New Guinea. The Unit here was equipped with a mix of Avro Anson, Bristol Beaufort and Tiger Moth aircraft and conducted supply and casualty evacuation flights until the end of the war. When the Pacific War ended in August 1945, No. 10 Local Air Supply Unit was tasked with dropping leaflets announcing the news over Japanese positions. Following the war No. 10 Local Air Supply Unit conducted courier flights to various locations in New Guinea until it was disbanded on 6 March 1946. 17 AOP Flight was disbanded on Bougainville in December, followed a month later by the Bougainville flight of No. 10 Local Air Supply Unit.
