= Royal Australian Air Force Maritime Section =

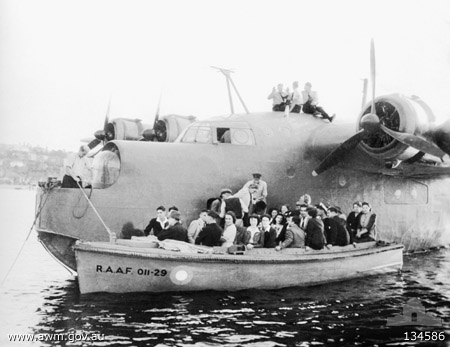
A RAAF work boat alongside a Sunderland flying boat

The Royal Australian Air Force Maritime Section was the branch of the Royal Australian Air Force responsible for manning boats operated by the Air Force. The typically small craft operated by the Section provided the RAAF with an air-sea rescue service, transported stores and provided support for seaplanes.

== History ==
The RAAF's first boats were obtained in 1921 to support the Fairey III seaplanes based at RAAF Base Point Cook. The RAAF Maritime Section was massively expanded during World War II and at its peak the Section operated over 600 powered and 700 unpowered craft (including several sailing vessels). While many of these craft were ex-civilian fishing boats, the RAAF also purchased a number of specialised craft. Small maritime sections were established at many RAAF bases in Australia and the South West Pacific and were administered by the units they supported. Most training for RAAF crews was undertaken at RAAF Base Rathmines in New South Wales.

Following the war, the RAAF Maritime Section was greatly reduced to operate only 65 powered and 42 unpowered craft. This force was reduced further when the RAAF retired its seaplanes in 1952 and as helicopters replaced air-sea rescue boats. The RAAF Maritime Section was disbanded on 31 January 1993.
