= Search and Rescue Wing RAAF =

Search and Rescue Wing
- Active: 1947–1948
- Country: Australia
- Branch: Royal Australian Air Force
- Role: Search and rescue
- Headquarters location: RAAF Base Rathmines

Aircraft flown
- Patrol: Consolidated PBY Catalina

Search and Rescue Wing was a seaplane-equipped unit of the Royal Australian Air Force (RAAF). It was established in October 1947 and renamed No. 11 Squadron in July the next year.

== History ==
Following the end of World War II, the RAAF's four squadrons equipped with Consolidated PBY Catalina were disbanded. On 1 October 1947 a new Search and Rescue Wing was formed at RAAF Base Rathmines, the RAAF's main seaplane base, to provide a search and rescue capability in and around Australia for the Department of Civil Aviation. This unit operated Catalinas, and took over previously-independent flights located at Darwin, Townsville and Port Moresby. The wing comprised four squadrons, which were designated Headquarters, Flying, Maintenance and Maritime. A Catalina and crew was held at readiness at each of the wing's bases. In addition, pilots, aircraft and ground crew from Search and Rescue Wing were assigned to work with the Australian National Antarctic Research Expedition in 1948.

The operations of the Search and Rescue Wing were hampered by insufficient manning, especially among pilots and skilled technicians. In order to meet its operational requirements the wing was unable to conduct training, and its pilots did not take their full leave entitlements. In addition, the Catalinas were in increasingly poor condition. The Search and Rescue Wing was renamed No. 11 Squadron on 1 July 1948.
