= No. 113 Air-Sea Rescue Flight RAAF =

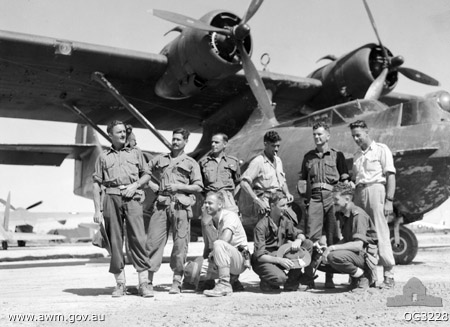
A No. 113 Air-Sea Rescue Flight Catalina and crew in August 1945

No. 113 Air-Sea Rescue Flight was a Royal Australian Air Force unit of World War II. The Flight was formed at Cairns, Queensland on 10 January 1945 and was equipped with PBY Catalinas for air-sea rescue operations. The Flight conducted its first operational missions in February, providing support for Allied air strikes and making supply drops. The flight departed Australia for Morotai in the Netherlands East Indies in late February, and became operational there in early March. From Morotai the Flight continued in its rescue and transport roles and also began flying missions behind Japanese lines in support of the Allied Intelligence Bureau (AIB).

In the months after the end of the war No. 113 Air-Sea Rescue Flight transported Australian prisoners of war home to Australia and performed other tasks to support Australian units in Borneo. The Flight returned to Australia in January 1946 and was disbanded at RAAF Base Rathmines on 31 January 1946.
