= No. 3 Operational Training Unit RAAF =

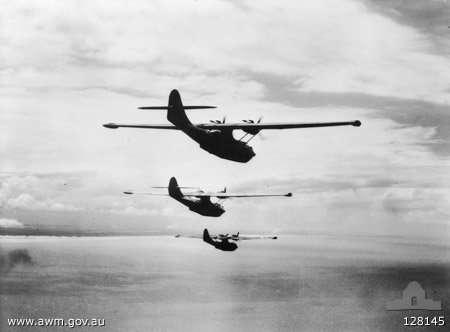
Catalina aircraft from No. 3 Operational Training Unit in 1943

No. 3 Operational Training Unit (3OTU) was the Royal Australian Air Force's main seaplane training unit during World War II.

Formed by expanding the RAAF's Seaplane Training Flight in late 1942, 3OTU was located at RAAF Base Rathmines in New South Wales and was responsible for converting RAAF aircrew to aircraft such as the Catalina and Kingfisher. In addition, aircraft from 3OTU flew anti-submarine patrols off the coast of New South Wales.

3OTU was disbanded following the end of the war.
