= No. 111 Air-Sea Rescue Flight RAAF =

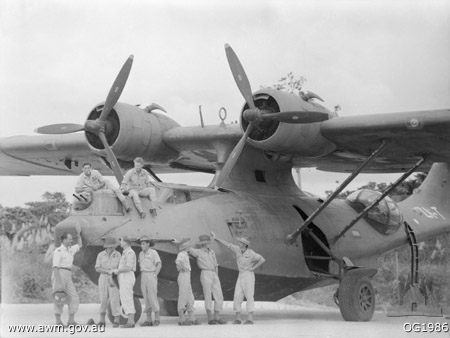
A No. 111 Flight crew with a Catalina in early 1945. The captain, Flight Lieutenant I. J. L. Wood (left), was awarded a DFC for rescuing a US air crew from enemy-controlled waters during 1944.

No. 111 Air-Sea Rescue Flight was a Royal Australian Air Force unit of World War II.

It was formed at Madang in New Guinea on 13 December 1944 and was equipped with Consolidated Catalinas.

The flight's role was to carry out search and rescue operations and provide air-sea rescue support to other aircraft during attacks on Japanese targets. The flight's aircraft also conducted offensive operations and dropped supplies on behalf of the Australian New Guinea Administrative Unit.

Following the end of the war the Flight moved to Port Moresby on 18 March 1946 and was disbanded there on 24 January 1947.
