= No. 112 Air-Sea Rescue Flight RAAF =

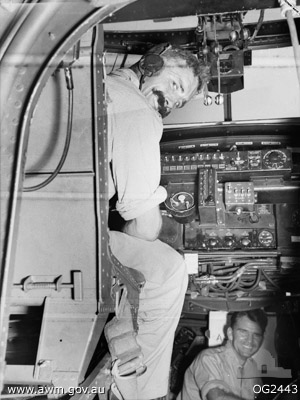
The pilot and another crew member of a No. 112 Air-Sea Rescue Flight Catalina

No. 112 Air-Sea Rescue Flight was a Royal Australian Air Force unit of World War II. The Flight was formed at Darwin, Northern Territory on 23 December 1944 and was equipped with PBY Catalinas. The Flight's role was to carry out search and rescue operations as well as air-sea rescue support to other aircraft during attacks on Japanese targets.

Following the end of the War No. 112 Air-Sea Rescue Flight evacuated former prisoners of war from Borneo and Morotai to Australia and provided a regular courier and supply service to Australian outposts in East Timor and the Northern Territory. The Flight was disbanded at Darwin on 16 September 1947.
