= List of Royal Australian Air Force Communication Units =

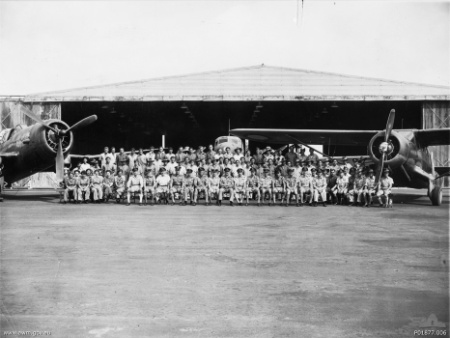
Members of No. 7 Communication Unit with a Vultee Vengeance aircraft (left), an Avro Anson aircraft (centre) and an A71-14 Norseman aircraft (right). These three types of aircraft were used by many Communication Units.

During and shortly after World War II the Royal Australian Air Force formed 13 Communication Units. These flight-sized units performed a wide range of support roles including transport, supplying isolated garrisons and supporting training. The Communication Units typically operated small numbers of several types of aircraft.

Summary list of RAAF Communication Units
| Name | Formed | Disbanded | Area of operations | Remarks |
| No. 1 Communication Unit | 1 Nov 1939 | 22 Jul 1948 | Victoria | Provided VIP transport from September 1944 |
| No. 2 Communication Unit | 2 Dec 1940 | 15 Jul 1944 | New South Wales | |
| No. 3 Communication Unit | 30 Jun 1942 | 28 Feb 1946 | New South Wales | |
| No. 4 Communication Unit | 7 Sep 1942 | 16 Apr 1946 | Queensland | |
| No. 5 Communication Unit | 1 Dec 1942 | 9 Mar 1946 | North Queensland | |
| No. 6 Communication Unit | 8 Dec 1942 | 30 Dec 1945 | Northern Territory | |
| No. 7 Communication Unit | 24 Dec 1943 | 31 May 1946 | Western Australia | |
| No. 8 Communication Unit | 4 Nov 1943 | 4 Mar 1946 | New Guinea | Formed from No. 1 Rescue and Communications Squadron |
| No. 9 Communication Unit | 4 Nov 1943 | 10 May 1946 | New Guinea, Borneo | Formed from No. 1 Rescue and Communications Squadron |
| No. 10 Communication Unit | 11 Sep 1944 | 17 Nov 1944 | Bougainville Island | |
| No. 11 Communication Unit | 13 Mar 1945 | February 1946 | Netherlands East Indies | |
| No. 13 Communication Unit | 17 Jul 1945 | 23 Oct 1945 | Queensland | No aircraft issued |
| No. 30 Communication Unit | 1 Nov 1950 | 10 Mar 1953 | Korea | Redesignated No. 30 Transport Unit in November 1951, and No. 36 (Transport) Squadron in March 1953 |
