= Seaplane Training Flight RAAF =

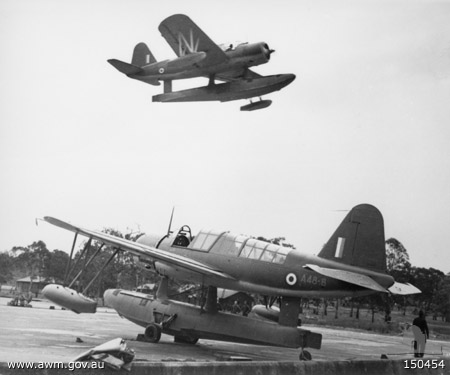
Seaplane Training Flight Kingfishers in August 1942

The Seaplane Training Flight was a Royal Australian Air Force unit responsible for providing seaplane conversion training to RAAF air and ground crew.

The Seaplane Training Flight was established on 1 March 1940 at RAAF Base Rathmines in New South Wales. Initially equipped with two Supermarine Seagull aircraft the Flight received Consolidated Catalina aircraft in the second half of 1940 and a small number of Vought Kingfisher aircraft in early 1942.

As part of the expansion of the RAAF's seaplane units the Seaplane Training Flight was expanded to form No. 3 Operational Training Unit on 28 December 1942.
