= Baudissin Glacier =

Glacier on Heard Island in the southern Indian Ocean

- Location of Heard Island and McDonald Islands on the globe

- Location within Indian Ocean
- Interactive map of Baudissin Glacier
- Type: cirque/tidewater
- Location: Heard Island, Territory of Heard Island and McDonald Islands, Australia
- Coordinates: 53°2′S 73°26′E
- Width: 1.5 nautical miles (2.8 km; 1.7 mi)
- Thickness: 55 m (180 ft)
- Terminus: western side of Corinthian Bay, at Sealers Cove
- Status: Retreating

Baudissin Glacier (53°2′S 73°26′E) is a tidewater glacier on the north side of Heard Island. in the southern Indian Ocean. Located 1 nautical mile (1.9 km) west of Challenger Glacier, Baudissin Glacier is 1.5 nautical miles (2.8 km) wide and flows into the western part of Corinthian Bay. The terminus of Baudissin Glacier is located at the western side of Corinthian Bay, at Sealers Cove. To the east of Baudissin Glacier is Challenger Glacier, whose terminus is located at the eastern side of Corinthian Bay, close west to Saddle Point. To the south of Baudissin Glacier is Schmidt Glacier, and to the northwest is Atlas Cove. Kildalkey Head is west of Schmidt Glacier. To the south of Schmidt Glacier is Vahsel Glacier, whose terminus is at South West Bay, between Erratic Point and Cape Gazert. Immediately south of Vahsel Glacier is Allison Glacier. Click here to see a map of Baudissin Glacier and the northwestern coast of Heard Island.

== Discovery and naming ==
Baudissin Glacier appears to have been first noted by a sketch in the narrative accompanying the scientific reports of the expedition of HMS Challenger in 1874 along the north side of the island. The German Antarctic Expedition under Erich von Drygalski, 1901–03, portrayed a single large glacier flowing into Corinthian Bay and named it after Admiral Count Friedrich Baudissin, a sponsor of the expedition. In 1948 the ANARE (Australian National Antarctic Research Expeditions) determined that more than one glacier discharges into Corinthian Bay. Antarctic Names Committee of Australia (ANCA) recommended in 1954 that Baudissin Glacier be adopted for the westernmost and largest of these glaciers.
