= Vahsel Glacier =

Glacier on Heard Island in the southern Indian Ocean

- Location of Heard Island and McDonald Islands on the globe

- Location within Indian Ocean
- Interactive map of Vahsel Glacier
- Type: cirque/tidewater
- Location: Heard Island; Territory of Heard Island and McDonald Islands; Australia
- Coordinates: 53°04′S 73°23′E
- Thickness: approximately 55 meters
- Terminus: South West Bay, between Erratic Point and Cape Gazert
- Status: Retreating

Vahsel Glacier (53°04′S 73°23′E) is a glacier on the northwestern side of Heard Island in the southern Indian Ocean. It flows west into South West Bay, between Erratic Point and Cape Gazert. Immediately to the north of Vahsel Glacier is Schmidt Glacier, whose terminus is located between Mount Drygalski and North West Cornice. To the south of Vahsel Glacier is Allison Glacier, whose terminus is located south of Cape Gazert, which separates Allison Glacier from Vahsel Glacier.

== Discovery and naming ==
Vahsel Glacier was charted in 1902 by the German Antarctic Expedition under Erich von Drygalski. A landing party was sent ashore near Atlas Cove on 3 February 1902. Drygalski named the glacier for Richard Vahsel, an officer of the landing party of the Gauss expedition who conducted investigations near Atlas Cove. Vahsel was later captain of Wilhelm Filchner's Deutschland; he died in August 1912 during the drift of the Deutschland.
