= Schmidt Glacier (Heard Island and McDonald Islands) =

Glacier on Heard Island in the southern Indian Ocean

- Location of Heard Island and McDonald Islands on the globe

- Location within Indian Ocean
- Interactive map of Schmidt Glacier
- Type: cirque/tidewater
- Location: Heard Island; Territory of Heard Island and McDonald Islands; Australia
- Coordinates: 53°3′S 73°24′E
- Length: 0.7 nautical miles (1.3 km)
- Thickness: approximately 55 meters
- Terminus: between Mount Drygalski and North West Cornice
- Status: Retreating

Schmidt Glacier (53°3′S 73°24′E) is a glacier, 0.7 nautical miles (1.3 km) long, flowing west from Baudissin Glacier between Mount Drygalski and North West Cornice, on the west side of Heard Island in the southern Indian Ocean. To the north of Schmidt Glacier is Baudissin Glacier, whose terminus is located at the western side of Corinthian Bay, near Sealers Cove. Kildalkey Head is west of Schmidt Glacier. To the south of Schmidt Glacier is Vahsel Glacier, whose terminus is at South West Bay, between Erratic Point and Cape Gazert. Immediately south of Vahsel Glacier is Allison Glacier. Click here to see a map of Schmidt Glacier and the northwestern coast of Heard Island.

== Discovery and naming ==
Schmidt Glacier was roughly charted in 1902 by the 1st German Antarctic Expedition under Erich von Drygalski. He named it for Dr. J. Schmidt of the Royal Prussian Ministry, who assisted in obtaining government support for the expedition.
