= Challenger Glacier =

Glacier on Heard Island in the southern Indian Ocean

- Location of Heard Island and McDonald Islands on the globe

- Location within Indian Ocean
- Interactive map of Challenger Glacier
- Type: cirque/tidewater
- Location: Heard Island; Territory of Heard Island and McDonald Islands; Australia
- Coordinates: 53°2′S 73°28′E
- Width: 0.8 nautical miles (1.5 km)
- Thickness: 55 metres (180 ft)
- Terminus: eastern side of Corinthian Bay, close west to Saddle Point
- Status: Retreating

Challenger Glacier is a tidewater glacier on the north side of Heard Island in the southern Indian Ocean. Located 1 nautical mile (2 km) east of Baudissin Glacier, Challenger Glacier is 0.8 nautical miles (1.5 km) wide and flows into the eastern side of Corinthian Bay, close west to Saddle Point. To the east of Challenger Glacier is Downes Glacier, whose terminus is located at Mechanics Bay, between Saddle Point and Cape Bidlingmaier. To the west of Challenger Glacier is Baudissin Glacier, whose terminus is located at the western side of Corinthian Bay, near Sealers Cove.

== Discovery and naming ==
The glacier appears to have been first charted by the Gauss expedition under Erich von Drygalski, 1901–03, who portrayed a single large glacier flowing into Corinthian Bay. In 1948 the Australian National Antarctic Research Expeditions (ANARE) determined that more than one glacier discharges into Corinthian Bay. ANARE applied the name Challenger Glacier to the easternmost of these glaciers to commemorate the work of the British Challenger Expedition, 1873–76.
