= Ealey Glacier =

Glacier of Heard Island in the southern Indian Ocean

- Location of Heard Island and McDonald Islands on the globe

- Location within Indian Ocean
- Interactive map of Ealey Glacier
- Type: cirque/tidewater
- Location: Heard Island; Territory of Heard Island and McDonald Islands; Australia
- Coordinates: 53°2′S 73°35′E
- Thickness: 55 m (180 ft)
- Terminus: close southeast of Cape Bidlingmaier, between Melbourne Bluff and North Barrier
- Status: Retreating

Ealey Glacier (53°2′S 73°35′E) is a glacier, flowing northeast from the lower slopes of the Big Ben massif to the northeast side of Heard Island in the southern Indian Ocean. Its terminus is located close southeast of Cape Bidlingmaier, between Melbourne Bluff and North Barrier. The glacier terminates in ice cliffs. To the southeast of Ealey Glacier is Compton Glacier, whose terminus is located at Compton Lagoon, between Gilchrist Beach and Fairchild Beach. To the west of Ealey Glacier is Downes Glacier, whose terminus is located at Mechanics Bay, between Saddle Point and Cape Bidlingmaier.

== Discovery and naming ==
Ealey Glacier is named after E. H. M. "Tim" Ealey, biologist on the 1949 ANARE Heard Island Expedition who crossed the glacier during a biological survey en route to Spit Point.
