= Allison Glacier (Heard Island) =

Glacier on Heard Island, Indian Ocean

- Location of Heard Island and McDonald Islands on the globe

- Location within Indian Ocean
- Interactive map of Allison Glacier (Heard Island)
- Type: ice stream
- Location: Heard Island; Territory of Heard Island and McDonald Islands; Australia
- Coordinates: 53°04′S 73°24′E
- Thickness: approximately 55 meters
- Terminus: immediately south of Cape Gazert
- Status: Retreating

Allison Glacier (53°04′S 73°24′E) is an ice stream on the west side of Heard Island in the southern Indian Ocean. Allison Glacier flows from Big Ben massif down to the sea to the south of Cape Gazert. To the north of Allison Glacier is Vahsel Glacier, whose terminus is at South West Bay, between Erratic Point and Cape Gazert. Immediately to the north of Vahsel Glacier is Schmidt Glacier, whose terminus is located between Mount Drygalski and North West Cornice. To the south of Allison Glacier is Abbotsmith Glacier, while Cape Gazert is immediately west.

== Discovery and naming ==
Allison Glacier was named after Ian Allison, an Australian glaciologist who carried out glaciological research in this area in 1971 for the Australian Antarctic Division during the French-Australian Antarctic Expedition.

== See also ==
- List of glaciers in the Antarctic
- Retreat of glaciers since 1850
