= Downes Glacier =

Glacier on Heard Island in the southern Indian Ocean

- Location of Heard Island and McDonald Islands on the globe

- Location within Indian Ocean
- Interactive map of Downes Glacier
- Type: tidewater
- Location: Heard Island; Territory of Heard Island and McDonald Islands; Australia
- Coordinates: 53°2′S 73°31′E
- Thickness: approximately 55 meters
- Terminus: Mechanics Bay, between Saddle Point and Cape Bidlingmaier
- Status: Retreating

Downes Glacier (53°2′S 73°31′E) is a broad tidewater glacier on the north side of Heard Island in the southern Indian Ocean. It flows north on both sides of Cape Bidlingmaier to the north coast of Heard Island. To the east of Downes Glacier is Ealey Glacier, whose terminus is located close southeast of Cape Bidlingmaier. To the west of Downes Glacier is Challenger Glacier, whose terminus is located at the eastern side of Corinthian Bay, close west to Saddle Point. Saddle Point separates Downes Glacier from Challenger Glacier.

== Discovery and naming ==
Surveyed by ANARE (Australian National Antarctic Research Expeditions) in 1948. Named by Antarctic Names Committee of Australia (ANCA) for M.C. Downes, ANARE biologist at Heard Island in 1951 and 1963.
