= Ealey =

Ealey is a surname. Notable people with the name include:

- Adolphus Ealey (1941–1992), American artist, curator, educator, writer, and entrepreneur
- Carly Ealey, artist from San Diego, California, best known for her mural installations
- Chuck Ealey (born 1950), American former professional football player
- Kristian Ealey (1977–2016), British actor and musician
- Robert Ealey (1925–2001), American electric blues singer
- Roland J. Ealey (1914–1992), former member of the Virginia House of Delegates
- Tim Ealey (1927–2020), Australian biologist

== See also ==
- Ealey Glacier flows from the Big Ben massif to Heard Island in the southern Indian Ocean
