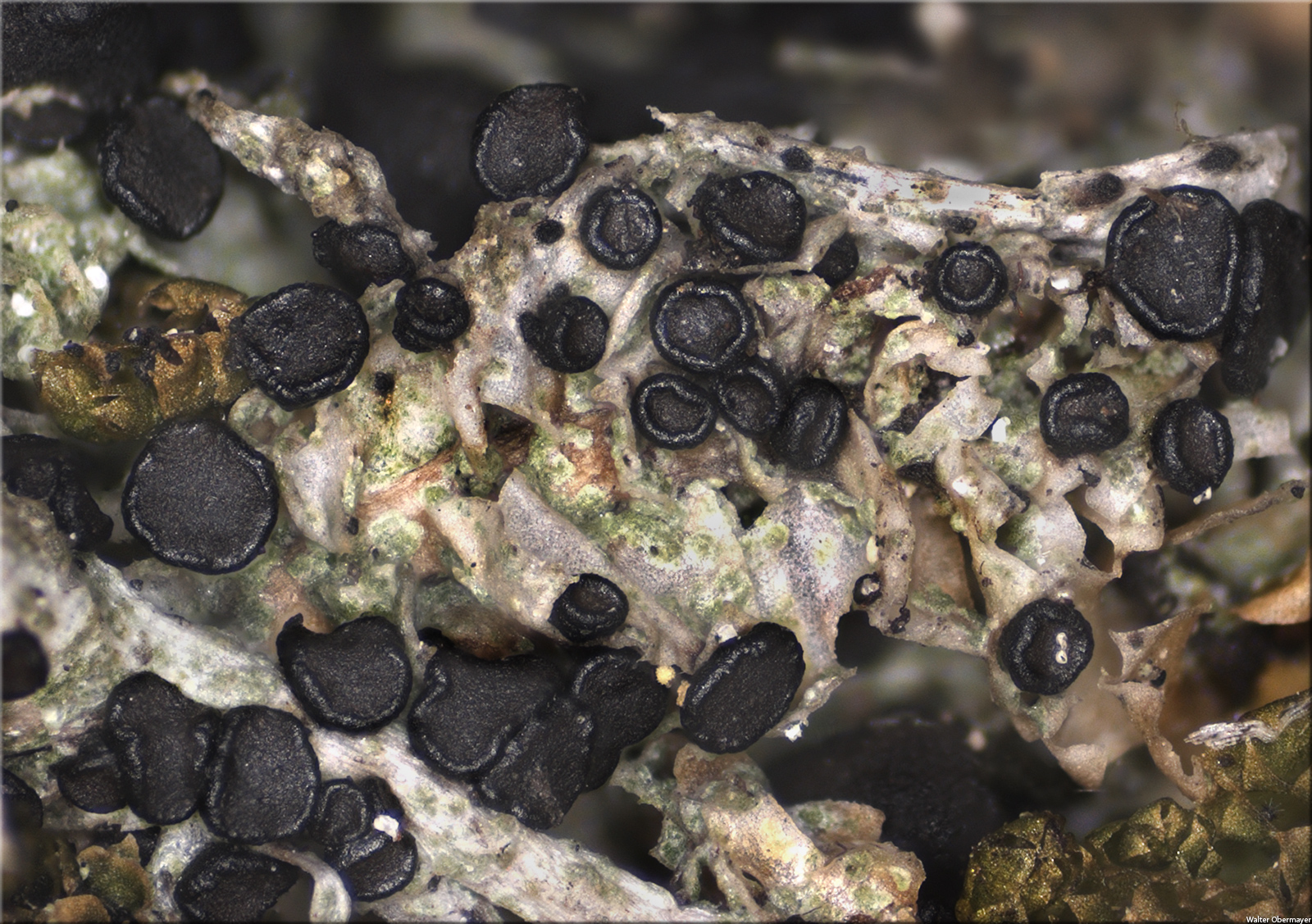
- Bryobilimbia hypnorum

Scientific classification
- Kingdom: Fungi
- Division: Ascomycota
- Class: Lecanoromycetes
- Order: Lecideales
- Family: Lecideaceae
- Genus: Bryobilimbia; Fryday, Printzen & S.Ekman (2014)

Type species
- Bryobilimbia hypnorum (Lib.) Fryday, Printzen & S.Ekman (2014)

= Bryobilimbia =

Genus of lichen-forming fungi

Bryobilimbia is a genus of lichen-forming fungi belonging to the family Lecideaceae. It was circumscribed in 2014 by Alan Fryday, Christian Printzen, and Stefan Ekman. The type species is Bryolimbia hypnorum.

== Taxonomy ==
The genus Bryobilimbia was circumscribed in 2014 by Alan Fryday, Christian Printzen, and Stefan Ekman. The research team established this new genus after molecular phylogenetics analysis revealed that several species previously classified within Lecidea and Mycobilimbia formed a distinct evolutionary group separate from either genus. The type species for the genus is Bryobilimbia hypnorum (formerly Lecidea hypnorum). While superficially similar to some other lichen genera, DNA analysis based on five different genes demonstrated that Bryobilimbia species form a well-supported clade most closely related to genera like Clauzadea, Farnoldia, Lecidoma, and Romjularia, rather than being part of the true family Lecideaceae.

Bryobilimbia was named by combining "bryo-" (referring to bryophytes or mosses, which are the typical substrate for these lichens) with "-bilimbia" (from the historical genus name Bilimbia, which some of these species were once thought to belong to).

== Description ==
Bryobilimbia lichens have a relatively inconspicuous, thin, greyish thallus (main body) that sometimes shows brownish tints. Their reproductive structures (apothecia) are dark brown to black, measuring 0.6–1.2 mm across, and can sometimes form clusters that resemble blackberries. The apothecia typically have a flat to convex surface.

A distinctive microscopic feature of Bryobilimbia is the presence of scattered blue-violet granules in the hymenium (reproductive layer) that turn green when treated with potassium hydroxide solution (K). The spores they produce are usually simple (without internal divisions), though occasionally they may have one partition. These spores have a distinctive warty outer layer and are surrounded by a thin gelatinous coat.

The genus can be distinguished from related groups by several characteristics:

- The presence of blue-violet granules in their reproductive structures
- Paraphyses (sterile filaments) that are only slightly swollen at the tips
- A dark reddish-brown hypothecium (tissue layer beneath the reproductive layer)
- Rod-shaped (bacilliform) conidia approximately 1 micrometre wide
- Their tendency to grow on mosses and plant debris, though some species occur on damp rocks

== Species ==
As of February 2025, Species Fungorum (in the Catalogue of Life) accept nine species of Bryobilimbia:

- Bryobilimbia ahlesii (Körb.) Fryday, Printzen & S.Ekman (2014)
- Bryobilimbia australis (Kantvilas & Messuti) Fryday, Printzen & S.Ekman (2014)
- Bryobilimbia austrosaxicola Fryday & Coppins (2014)
- Bryobilimbia diapensiae (Th.Fr.) Fryday, Printzen & S.Ekman (2014)
- Bryobilimbia fissuriseda (Poelt) Timdal, Marthinsen & Rui (2019)
- Bryobilimbia flakusii Rodr.Flakus 2020)
- Bryobilimbia hypnorum (Lib.) Fryday, Printzen & S.Ekman (2014)
- Bryobilimbia pallida Rodr.Flakus 2020)
- Bryobilimbia sanguineoatra (Wulfen) Fryday, Printzen & S.Ekman (2014)
