= Mycobilimbia subbyssoidea =

Scientific classification
- Kingdom: Fungi
- Division: Ascomycota
- Class: Lecanoromycetes
- Order: Lecanorales
- Family: Ramalinaceae
- Genus: Mycobilimbia
- Species: M. subbyssoidea

Binomial name
- Mycobilimbia subbyssoidea Øvstedal (2008)

Species of lichen

Mycobilimbia subbyssoidea is a species of crustose lichen in the family Ramalinaceae. This small lichen forms thin, greyish patches with tiny black fruiting bodies up to 1 mm across. It was found growing among dying moss on Heard Island, a remote and largely ice-covered island in the southern Indian Ocean, and remains known only from the original discovery site.

== Taxonomy ==
Mycobilimbia subbyssoidea was described as new to science by Dag Øvstedal in a survey of the lichens of subAntarctic Heard Island. The holotype was collected on Corinth Head at 170 m elevation in 2001 by N.J.M. Gremmen (specimen H-1496, kept at the herbarium of the Australian Antarctic Division, ADT). Earlier, the material had been listed only as Mycobilimbia sp.; subsequent review of the literature—including Southern Hemisphere species treatments—showed it lacked a valid name and warranted formal description.

== Description ==
The thallus is thin and indistinct (described as "evanescent"), greyish, and lacks a protective outer skin (ecorticate). Its photosynthetic partner is a green alga of the Trebouxia type with cells 6–8 micrometres (μm) across. The fruiting bodies (apothecia) are black, up to about 1 mm in diameter, with a narrow but distinct rim and a flat disc; the underside often shows patches of cottony (byssoid) white tissue.

Internally, the spore-bearing layer (hymenium) is 100–110 μm tall and turns blue with iodine-based reagents (amyloid). Beneath it lie a strongly red-brown layer and a blue-pigmented zone; the pigments intensify slightly in standard spot tests. The asci are of the Biatora-type and the paraphyses are very slender. Ascospores are colourless, with 1–3 cross-walls, typically 30–33 × 5–6 μm, and have pointed ends; no pycnidia were seen. No secondary metabolites were detected, as there was insufficient material for full chemical tests.

== Habitat and distribution ==
The species was found growing among dying moss cushions (moribund bryophytes) and is known only from the type collection on Heard Island. Heard Island is a cold, windy, largely glaciated oceanic island in the southern Indian Ocean.
