= Corinth Head =

- Headland
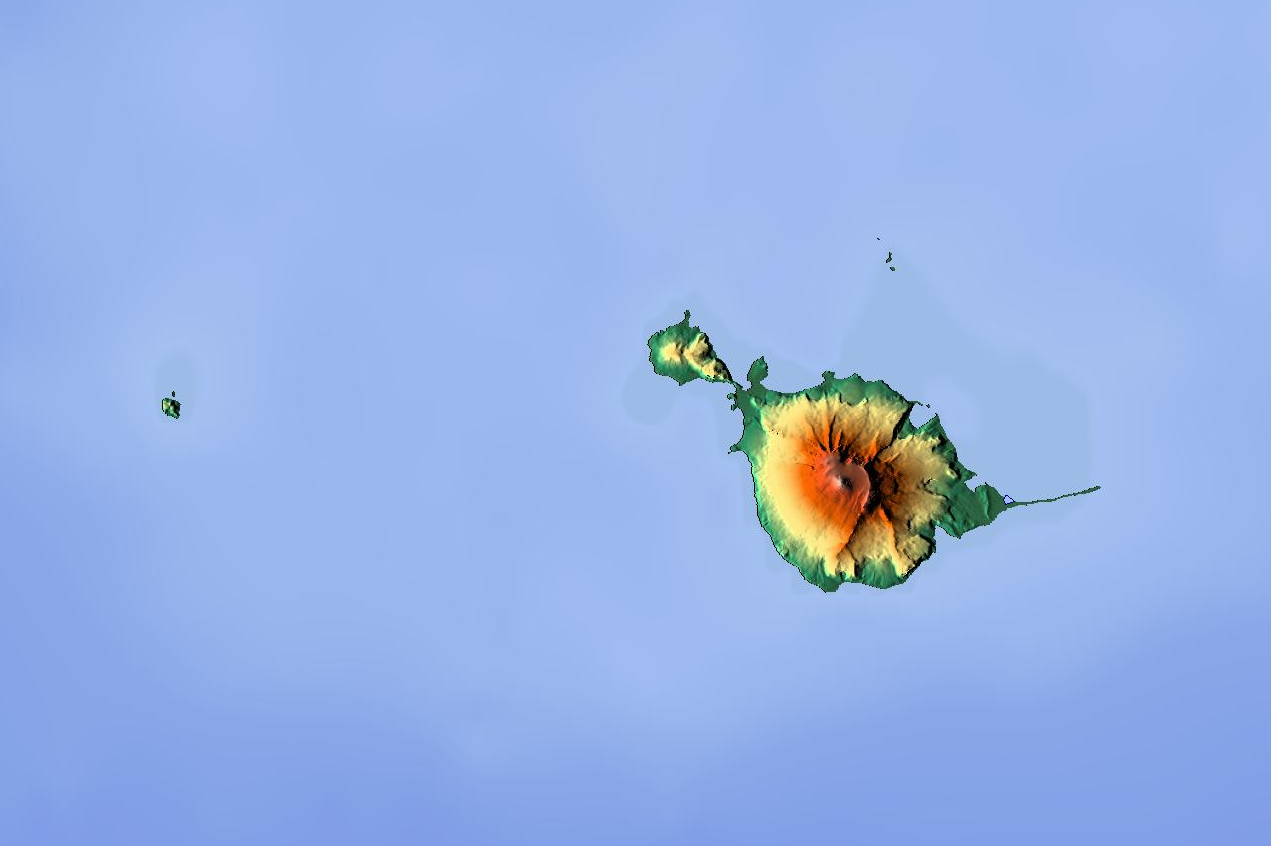
- Coordinates: 53°1′S 73°25′E
- Location: Heard Island

Corinth Head is a rocky headland 0.5 nautical miles (1 km) southeast of Rogers Head, overlooking the west side of Corinthian Bay, on the north side of Heard Island. The feature appears to have been roughly charted by the First German Antarctica Expedition under Erich von Drygalski, who made a running survey of the north side of the island in 1902. It was resurveyed by the Australian National Antarctic Research Expeditions in 1948, and so named by them because of its close association with Corinthian Bay.
