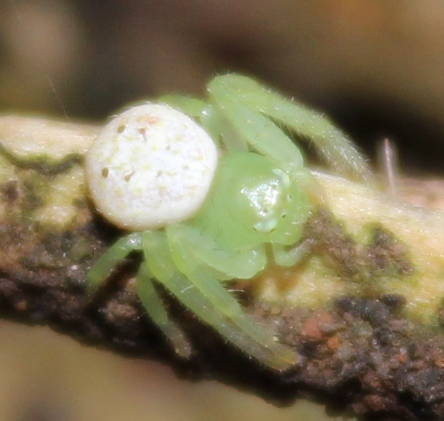
- S. riflense from South Africa
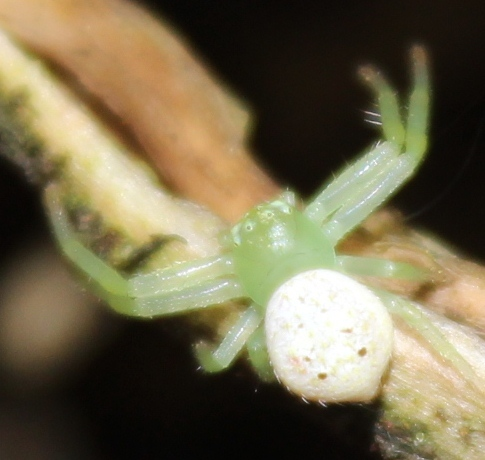

Scientific classification
- Kingdom: Animalia
- Phylum: Arthropoda
- Subphylum: Chelicerata
- Class: Arachnida
- Order: Araneae
- Infraorder: Araneomorphae
- Family: Thomisidae
- Genus: Synema
- Species: S. riflense

Binomial name
- Synema riflense Strand, 1909

= Synema riflense =

Simonstown Synema crab spider

Species of spider

Synema riflense is a species of crab spider in the family Thomisidae. It is endemic to South Africa and is commonly known as the Simonstown Synema crab spider.

== Taxonomy ==
The species was first described by Embrik Strand in 1909 based on a male specimen collected during the German Antarctic Expedition of 1901-1903. The holotype is deposited in the Museum für Naturkunde, Berlin.

== Distribution ==
Synema riflense is endemic to South Africa and has been recorded from three provinces. The species is found at elevations ranging from 15 to 1,328 meters above sea level.

== Habitat ==
Synema riflense is a free-living species found on vegetation. The spiders live on plants and are occasionally found inside flower corollas, which is typical behavior for crab spiders that ambush prey on flowers. The species has been sampled from both Fynbos and Grassland biomes.

== Description ==
Currently, only the male of Synema riflense has been described in detail.

The male has a total length of 2.8 mm.

The cephalothorax is brownish-yellow, noticeably darker than the extremities, with black eyes. The eye region is whitish, while the rest of the cephalothorax is uniform in color. The chelicerae and labium are similar to the latter, and the sternum and maxillae are lighter.The opisthosoma is brownish-yellow above, lightly reddish, with fine whitish tubercles that form a specific pattern when viewed from above. The dorsal surface shows two rounded dark spots in the middle, with additional markings including a cross-shaped pattern of four spots in the center and two curved rows of spots forming connected patches.

The female remains undescribed.

== Conservation status ==
Synema riflense is classified as Least Concern according to South African national assessments. Despite being known from only one sex and having a relatively small area of occupancy, the species has a wide geographical range across three provinces.

The species faces no known threats and is protected within the Kogelberg Nature Reserve. However, additional sampling is needed to collect and describe the female, and the overall status of the species remains somewhat obscure due to limited specimens.
