= Bryobilimbia austrosaxicola =

Scientific classification
- Kingdom: Fungi
- Division: Ascomycota
- Class: Lecanoromycetes
- Order: Lecideales
- Family: Lecideaceae
- Genus: Bryobilimbia
- Species: B. austrosaxicola

Binomial name
- Bryobilimbia austrosaxicola Fryday & Coppins (2014)
- Holotype: summit of Mount Azimuth on Campbell Island, New Zealand

Species of lichen

Bryobilimbia austrosaxicola is a species of crustose lichen within the family Lecideaceae. This species is closely related to Bryobilimbia australis, distinguishable by its saxicolous (rock-dwelling) nature, presenting with a brown, rather than violaceous, epihymenium, and ascospores that have a single septum.

== Taxonomy ==
The species was identified for the first time in New Zealand, specifically on Campbell Island, atop rock outcrops at the summit of Mount Azimuth, recorded at a height of 488 m (1,601 ft) on January 3, 1970, by Henry Imshaug. Alan Fryday and Brian Coppins formally described it as a new species in 2014.

Bryobilimbia austrosaxicola is placed within the genus Bryobilimbia due to its similarities with B. australis and the presence of bacilliform (rod-shaped) conidia, a characteristic shared across the genus. Its differentiation from B. australis and other genus members is primarily through its saxicolous habit and consistently 1-septate ascospores. The suggestion to classify this taxon within the Lecidea hypnorum group came from Brian Coppins, hence his inclusion as an author of the species.

== Description ==
The lichen spreads over surfaces up to 5 cm across, forming a patchwork of pale grey, thin, angular areoles that are flat to slightly convex, each measuring between 0.2 and 0.3 mm. The core of the lichen, or medulla, does not produce a reaction with iodine. It has a primary photobiont of chlorococcoid nature, with cells measuring 5–9 μm in diameter, and a secondary photobiont that consists of small clumps of cyanobacteria, including both Stigonema, characterised by short, branched, yellow-brown filaments, and Gloeocapsa, noticeable for its groups of 2–4 cells within a reddish sheath.

Apothecia (fruiting bodies) are common, black, and range from flat to convex, with a diameter of 1.0–1.5 mm. They are generally circular but can become angular when confluent. The hymenium, a tissue layer containing the spore-producing asci, is infused with a red-brown pigment, and paraphyses (filamentous structures among the asci) are sparse and simple. The asci themselves are cylindrical to clavate, housing hyaline (clear), 1-septate ascospores measuring 10–12 by 3.5–4.0 μm.

Chemical analyses have not detected any secondary substances through thin-layer chromatography (TLC), and all standard chemical spot test reactions are negative.

== Habitat and distribution ==
This lichen's presence is only verified from three collections on Campbell Island, New Zealand, suggesting its rarity and specific habitat preference on mountainous sites. It tends to associate with a limited number of other species, including Placopsis sp. and Steinera radiata subsp. aucklandica. In the 2018 edition of the Conservation status of New Zealand indigenous lichens and lichenicolous fungi, Bryobilimbia austrosaxicola appears for the first time, where it is given the status "island endemic".
