= Stuart Campbell (explorer) =

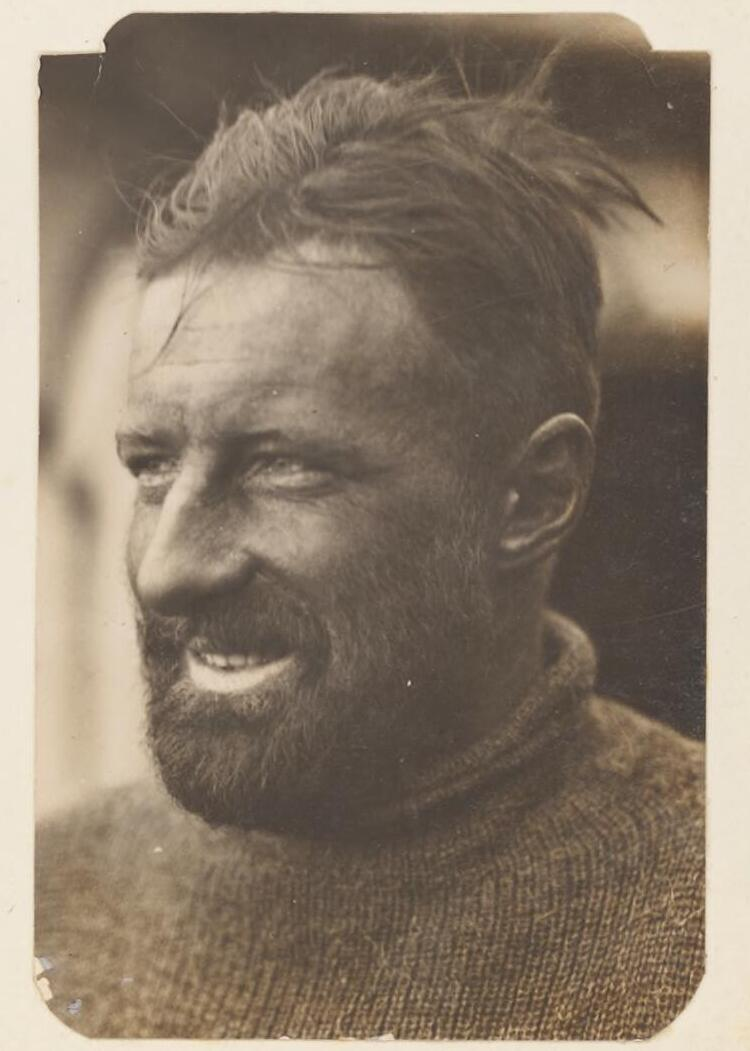
- Campbell c. 1930
- Born: 27 March 1903; Darling Point, New South Wales, Australia
- Died: 7 March 1988 (aged 84); Townsville, Queensland, Australia
- Military career
- Allegiance: Australia
- Branch: RAAF
- Service years: 1926–1946
- Rank: Group captain
- Commands: No. 42 Squadron RAAF; No. 76 Wing RAAF

Stuart Alexander Caird Campbell (27 March 1903 – 7 March 1988) was an Australian air force officer and Antarctic explorer.

== Early life ==
Campbell was born on 27 March 1903 in Darling Point, New South Wales. He was the son of Caroline Maxwell (née Caird) and Murray Aird Campbell. He attended Sydney Church of England Grammar School and went on to study electrical and mechanical engineering at the University of Sydney, graduating Bachelor of Engineering in 1926.

== Military service ==
Campbell enlisted in the Royal Australian Air Force (RAAF) in 1926. After undertaking flying training he was commissioned as an officer and joined No. 101 Flight RAAF, where his initial duties including surveying the Great Barrier Reef. He later served aboard the seaplane tender HMAS Albatross in 1929.

Campbell transferred to the RAAF Reserve in 1932, returning to active duty upon the outbreak of World War II. He was promoted to squadron leader in 1939, to wing commander in 1941 and to group captain in 1942. He was appointed commander of No. 42 Squadron RAAF in December 1944 and commander of No. 76 Wing RAAF in May 1945, flying PBY Catalinas on long-range mine-laying operations. He was demobilised in April 1946.

== Antarctic exploration ==
=== Early involvement ===
In 1929, Campbell was selected to serve as the senior pilot to the British Australian and New Zealand Antarctic Research Expedition (BANZARE) led by Douglas Mawson. Along with Hubert Wilkins and Carl Ben Eielson, who had flown the first flight over the Antarctic the previous year, he and Gilbert Eric Douglas were pioneers of Antarctic aviation. Campbell flew a float-mounted Gipsy Moth biplane, which was raised and lowered from their ship via a cable. He was frequently accompanied by Mawson on flights to identify routes through pack ice and to map new territory between the Ross Sea and Enderby Land, which was subsequently claimed as the Australian Antarctic Territory.

=== Post-war expeditions ===
Campbell joined the Department of Civil Aviation after his discharge from the RAAF, but was soon seconded to the Australian National Antarctic Research Expeditions (ANARE). In November 1947, it was announced by the Chifley government that he would lead three Antarctic expeditions, to establish weather stations on Heard Island and Macquarie Island and a reserve fuel base on the French territory of Kerguelen Island, as part of a scheme to establish a permanent Australian base in Antarctica.

Campbell's first expedition landed on Heard Island the following month, claiming Heard Island and McDonald Islands as an Australian territory and established a forward base for 14 scientists. After returning to Australia he joined HMAS Wyatt Earp on a combined naval and ANARE expedition to survey King George V Land and reoccupy Mawson's Huts in Commonwealth Bay. The expedition proved unable to reach the Antarctic coastline due to higher than usual levels of pack ice. It instead headed east to survey the Balleny Islands, where Campbell and two others became the first to set foot on the islands in over a century.

Campbell Peak on Heard Island and Campbell Head, located on Antarctica's Mawson Coast, are named in Campbell's honour.

== Other activities and personal life ==
In 1951, Campbell was appointed as an aviation advisor to the government of Thailand, under a technical assistance program developed by the International Civil Aviation Organization. He lived in Thailand for two years, and in 1954, he was appointed as a commander of the Order of the Crown of Thailand for his work. He later returned to Thailand and established an import firm, Thai-Australia Co. Ltd. He published two books on Thailand, titled The Fundamentals of the Thai Language (1957) and A Guide to the Hard Corals of Thai Waters (1980).

In 1968, Campbell married Shelagh Ann Nickson, a nurse; they retired to Townsville, Queensland. He was widowed in 1985 and died on 7 March 1988 at his home in Townsville.
