= Bryobilimbia australis =

Scientific classification
- Kingdom: Fungi
- Division: Ascomycota
- Class: Lecanoromycetes
- Order: Lecideales
- Family: Lecideaceae
- Genus: Bryobilimbia
- Species: B. australis

Binomial name
- Bryobilimbia australis (Kantvilas & Messuti) Fryday, Printzen & S.Ekman (2014)
- Holotype: Projection Bluff, Tasmania

Synonyms
- Mycobilimbia australis Kantvilas & Messuti (2005)

Species of lichen-forming fungus

Bryobilimbia australis is a species of crustose lichen in the family Ramalinaceae. First described by lichenologist Gintaras Kantvilas in 2005 from specimens collected in Tasmania, this lichen forms dull-coloured, uneven patches that range from pale greyish to brownish or greenish grey. It is distinguished by its large, black, berry-like reproductive structures that can form complex clusters up to 9 millimetres wide, and its broad ecological tolerance. The species is found across the Southern Hemisphere, occurring in Tasmania, south-eastern mainland Australia, New Zealand, and Tierra del Fuego, where it grows on soil, plant litter, mosses, and dead vegetation in habitats ranging from coastal heathlands to alpine zones.

== Taxonomy ==
It was formally described as a new species in 2005 by the lichenologist Gintaras Kantvilas. The type specimen of the species was collected in Tasmania, Australia, on the summit plateau of Projection Bluff at an elevation of 1,260 m (4,130 ft). It was found growing on peaty soil in alpine heathland on 3 January 1994 by Gintaras Kantvilas and J. Jarman (collection number 3/94). The holotype is housed at the Tasmanian Herbarium (HO). The species epithet refers to its Southern Hemisphere distribution.

Original described as a member of the genus Mycobilimbia, it was transferred to Bryobilimbia in 2014.

== Description ==
Mycobilimbia australis is a crustose (crust-forming) lichen that forms a spreading, uneven, dull-coloured patch ranging from pale greyish to brownish or greenish grey. The lichen's main body (thallus) takes on the texture of whatever surface it grows on and is typically dotted with small black-brown spots that are either developing or aborted reproductive structures. When viewed in cross-section, the thallus lacks a distinct outer layer (cortex) and varies in thickness from 200 to 400 micrometres (μm), containing patches of a distinctive blue-black pigment that turns aeruginose green when treated with potassium hydroxide solution (K). The algal partner (photobiont) cells are broadly oval to spherical, measuring 9–20 by 8–16 μm.

The reproductive structures (apothecia) are relatively large, measuring 0.5–4.5 mm across, and range from brown to glossy jet-black in colour. Young apothecia are slightly convex with a thin black rim, but they soon become markedly convex and lose their rim. As they mature, the apothecia develop a wrinkled, brain-like surface and can form complex clusters resembling blackberries that reach up to 9 mm wide and 3 mm tall. These clusters often develop small, new apothecia on their surface.

Under the microscope, the spore-producing cells (asci) are narrowly club-shaped and measure 45–55 by 6–10 μm. Each ascus produces eight colourless spores that are oval to egg-shaped and measure 8–12(–13) by 3–5 μm. The spores are typically undivided, though they sometimes appear two-celled due to the presence of internal vacuoles, and very rarely (<0.5% of cases) develop a cross-wall. The species occasionally produces small reproductive structures called pycnidia, which are black, somewhat glossy, and measure 0.10–0.15 mm across. These structures produce tiny rod-shaped reproductive cells (conidia) measuring 4–5 by 1 μm.

When tested with common spot test used in lichen identification, M. australis shows no reaction, and no secondary metabolites are detected using thin-layer chromatography.

== Habitat and distribution ==
Bryobilimbia australis has a Southern Hemisphere distribution, being found in Tasmania, montane regions of south-eastern mainland Australia, New Zealand, and Tierra del Fuego. This distribution pattern is shared by several other lichen genera associated with cool temperate rainforest habitats, including Coccotrema, Pseudocyphellaria, Bunodophoron, Siphula, and Pannaria.

While the species is frequently encountered in alpine, treeless areas where it grows on soil, plant litter, mosses, dead vegetation, and other lichens, its apparent preference for alpine habitats may be due to habitat loss in lowland areas. The species demonstrates remarkable ecological versatility. In Tasmania, it occurs from coastal heathlands to alpine zones, growing in both low and high rainfall areas, and can be found in lowland grasslands and open eucalypt forests. In Tierra del Fuego, it grows near sea level up to 20 metres elevation in areas receiving 400–800 millimetres of annual rainfall, particularly in deciduous forests dominated by lenga (Nothofagus pumilio) and ñire (N. antarctica). B. australis often grows alongside various other lichens, including stunted forms of Cladia aggregata, Cladonia species, Lecanora epibryon, Megaspora verrucosa, and several Micarea species.
