= North Barrier =

Ridge of Antarctica

Coordinates: 53°4′S 73°35′E

North Barrier is a narrow rock ridge which descends northward from Campbell Peak to Mount Separation, and then along the northwest flank of Compton Glacier in northern Heard Island. The descriptive name was applied by ANARE (Australian National Antarctic Research Expeditions) in 1948.
