= Mount Separation =

Mountain on Heard Island

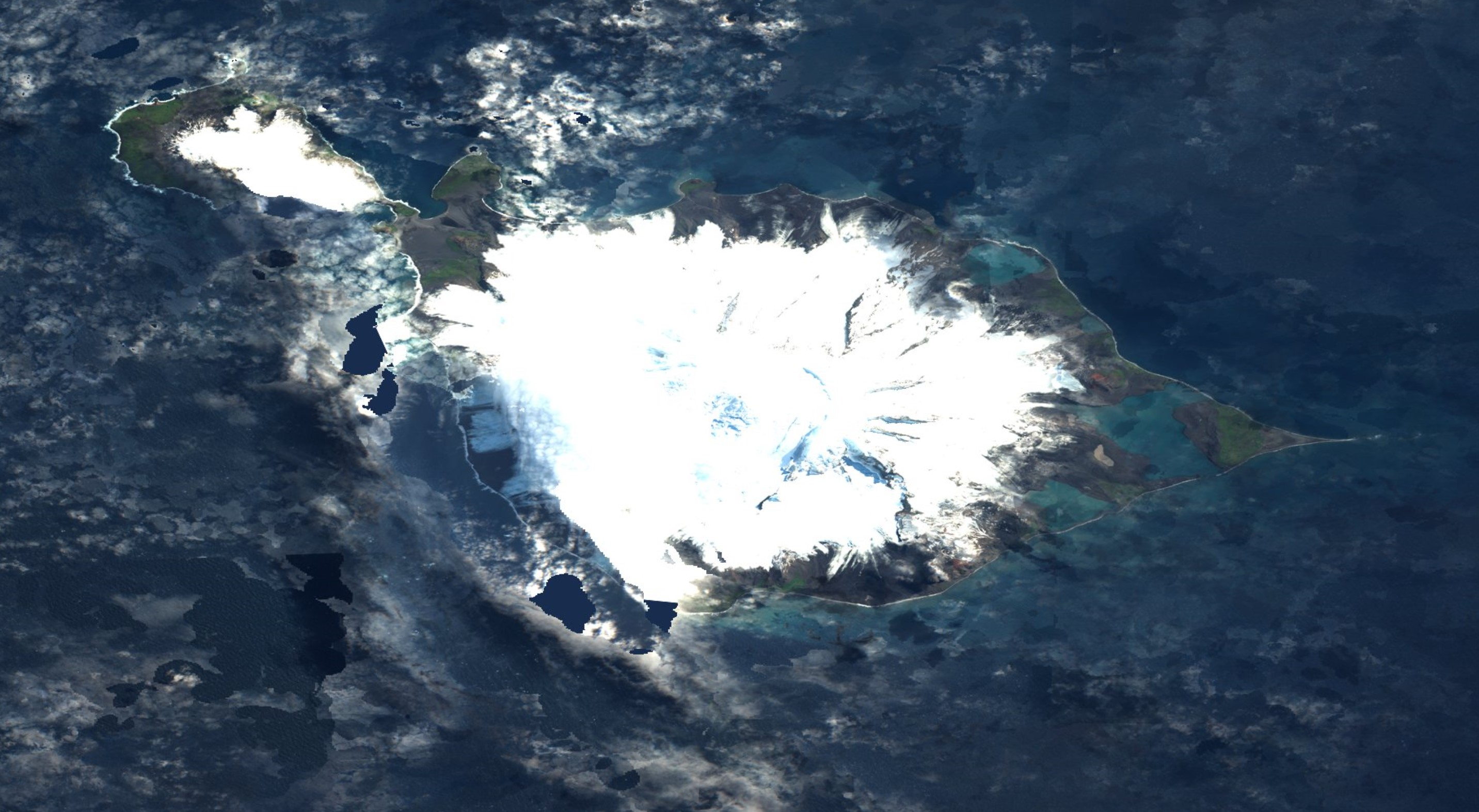
Mount Separation

Mount Separation (53°5′S 73°33′E) is a rocky peak, 1,480 m, standing 1 nautical mile (1.9 km) northeast of Campbell Peak on the northeast flank of Big Ben, the dominating mountain on Heard Island. Surveyed in 1948 by the ANARE (Australian National Antarctic Research Expeditions) and probably so named by them because this feature lies somewhat apart from the main cluster of peaks near the summit of Big Ben.
