= Bryobilimbia sanguineoatra =

Scientific classification
- Domain: Eukaryota
- Kingdom: Fungi
- Division: Ascomycota
- Class: Lecanoromycetes
- Order: Lecideales
- Family: Lecideaceae
- Genus: Bryobilimbia
- Species: B. sanguineoatra

Binomial name
- Bryobilimbia sanguineoatra (Wulfen) Fryday, Printzen & S.Ekman (2014)

Synonyms
- List: Lichen sanguineoater Wulfen (1791); Lecidea sanguineoatra (Wulfen) Ach. (1803); Lichen peltatus * sanguineoatra (Wulfen) Lam. (1813); Lecidea fuscolutea var. sanguineoatra (Wulfen) Ach. (1814); Patellaria sanguineoatra (Wulfen) Duby (1830); Biatora vernalis var. sanguineoatra (Wulfen) Fr. (1831); Lecidea vernalis var. sanguineoatra (Wulfen) Link (1833); Biatora sanguineoatra (Wulfen) Tuck. (1848); Biatora fusca var. sanguineoatra (Wulfen) Stein (1879); Lecidea fuscorubens var. sanguineoatra (Wulfen) Boistel (1903); Mycobilimbia sanguineoatra (Wulfen) Kalb & Hafellner (1992)

Species of lichen

Bryobilimbia sanguineoatra is a species of terricolous (ground-dwelling), crustose lichen in the family Lecideaceae. It occurs in Europe.

== Taxonomy ==
Bryobilimbia sanguineoatra was originally described by the Austrian naturalist Franz Xaver von Wulfen in 1789 as Lichen sanguineo-ater. In his original description, von Wulfen characterised the lichen as a leprose-crustose, farinaceous lichen with a whitish-greenish thallus. He described it as having hemispherical-convex, non-marginate tubercles that are deep blood-red in colour, eventually becoming black. Von Wulfen discovered this rare lichen in the forests near Labach (modern-day Ljubljana), growing on clayey soil. He initially considered it to potentially be L. sanguinarius or a variety thereof, but determined it warranted distinction as a separate species. The description notes that the farinaceous leprose covering spreads over the substrate, changing from whitish-green to greyish as it ages, and occurred on sloping clay soil. The hemispherical to spherical tubercles were described as lacking any distinct margin or circumference pattern.

Erik Acharius later transferred the species to the genus Lecidea in 1803, modifying the epithet to Lecidea sanguineoatra. In historical literature, the epithet has appeared with variant spellings, including sanguineo-ater (as originally used by Wulfen) and sanguineo-atra (as used by Acharius), though the unhyphenated form sanguineoatra has been consistently adopted in later works.

Over time, taxonomic uncertainty arose due to the absence of original material to verify Wulfen's concept of the species. In 1882, Ferdinand Arnold considered it conspecific with Bilimbia sabuletorum, a name published earlier than L. sanguineoatra. However, later authors continued to use the latter name, often with qualifiers such as sensu A.L. Smith or auct. to indicate differing interpretations.

To resolve ongoing confusion, a neotype was designated from a specimen collected in Bavaria, Germany, on spruce roots in 1862. The species was subsequently placed in Bryobilimbia by Alan Fryday, Christian Printzen, and Stefan Ekman, who formalized the new combination Bryobilimbia sanguineoatra.
