= No. 76 Wing RAAF =

Royal Australian Air Force (RAAF) wing during World War II

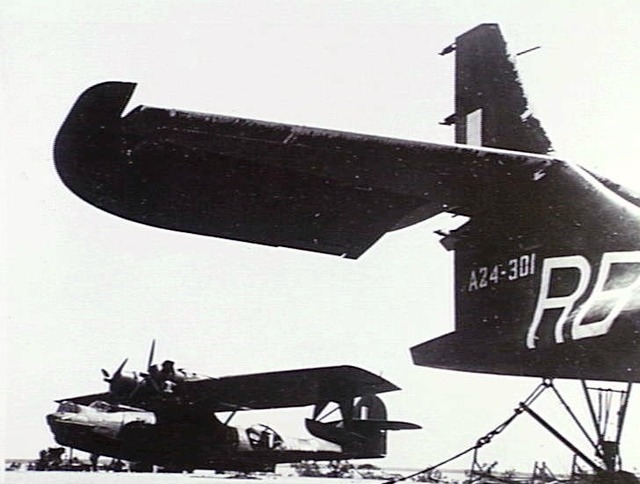
- Catalinas of No. 20 Squadron (foreground) and No. 42 Squadron (background)
- Active: 1944–1945
- Country: Australia
- Branch: Royal Australian Air Force
- Role: Minelaying
- Size: Three flying squadrons
- Part of: North-Western Area Command
- Engagements: World War II: North-Western Area campaign; Philippines campaign; Borneo campaign; Battle of North Borneo; Battle of Balikpapan

Aircraft flown
- Patrol: PBY Catalina

No. 76 Wing was a Royal Australian Air Force (RAAF) wing that operated during World War II. Initially based in Far North Queensland, its headquarters transferred to Darwin, Northern Territory, in September 1944 to take control of three PBY Catalina units: Nos. 20, 42, and 43 Squadrons. The prime task of these squadrons was minelaying in the South West Pacific theatre, and they conducted these operations as far afield as Java, Borneo, the Philippines, and China. As well as minelaying, No. 76 Wing's Catalinas flew bombing, patrol, and transport missions, and dropped millions of propaganda leaflets in the closing months of the war. The wing headquarters disbanded in November 1945.

== History ==
No. 76 Wing headquarters was established at Townsville, Queensland, on 3 January 1944, and moved to Cairns mid-month. Led by Wing Commander Reginald Burrage, it transferred to Darwin, Northern Territory, in September to coordinate and control minelaying operations in the North-Western Area by Nos. 20, 42, and 43 Squadrons. Each of the squadrons was equipped with PBY Catalina flying boats, nicknamed "Black Cats"; No. 20 had been based in Cairns with No. 76 Wing headquarters, No. 42 had just been formed at Darwin in August, while No. 43 had been operating out of Darwin since March. Minelaying missions carried out by the RAAF over the past year had been credited with successfully disrupting enemy shipping for a much smaller outlay of operating hours than conventional bombing, and were thus considered profitable enough to dedicate a wing with three squadrons to furthering the work. Although the Catalinas were relatively slow and susceptible to enemy fighter attack, their loss rate was no more than one per 95 sorties. In addition to its flying squadrons, the wing controlled No. 2 Flying Boat Maintenance Unit, No. 11 Air Sea Rescue Flight, and No. 3 Mobile Torpedo Unit. All units were located in Darwin except No. 42 Squadron, which was based at Melville Bay.

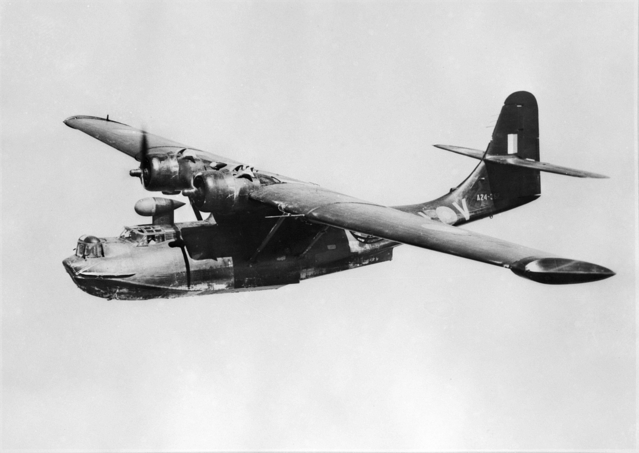
Catalina of No. 43 Squadron

The Catalina squadrons were expected to carry out a total of 100 missions per month from Darwin. In their first three weeks of operation from 13 September 1944 they accomplished 98, mining targets in Celebes, Java, and Surabaya. In October, they were able to use the recently liberated island of Morotai as a forward base for operations against Balikpapan and Tarakan. On 14 December, No. 43 Squadron, augmented by Catalinas from No. 11 Squadron based at Rathmines, New South Wales, mined Manila Bay to keep Japanese shipping "bottled up", thus supporting the Allied landing at Mindoro taking place the next day. Flying from Leyte, the 24 Catalinas successfully dropped 60 mines in the heavily defended target area for the loss of one of their number, and returned to base at the limit of their fuel reserves.

In the early part of 1945, monsoonal weather in Darwin reduced the number of missions flown by No. 76 Wing. On the night of 5/6 April, three Catalinas kept watch on the Japanese cruiser Isuzu, which was subsequently struck by Allied bombers and sunk by submarines. During the month, the Catalinas mined Hong Kong harbour, as well as targets on the coast of mainland China, flying up to sixteen hours per mission. On 26 May, they undertook the RAAF's most northerly operation during the Pacific War, against Wenchow. The same month, Group Captain Stuart Campbell, former leader of No. 42 Squadron, took over command of the wing. In May–June, reinforced by a detachment from No. 11 Squadron, No. 76 Wing flew mining and bombing missions in support of the forthcoming Operation Oboe Six, the Battle of North Borneo, and Oboe Two, the Battle of Balikpapan. Before Oboe Six, while some of the Catalinas concentrated on mining the approaches to Surabaya harbour, others bombed airfields in Java and Celebes in concert with RAAF B-24 Liberators. The Catalinas and Liberators combined again in the lead-up to Oboe Two to raid any Japanese airfields that could threaten Balikpapan, in some cases bombing the same target around the clock, the Catalinas by night and Liberators by day.

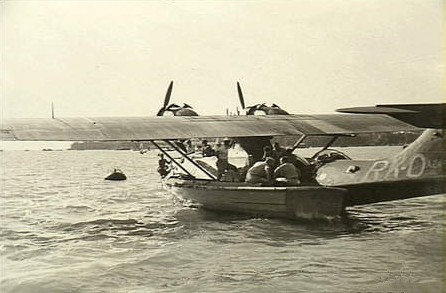
Catalina of No. 42 Squadron at Darwin, 1945

With the Allies' decision to confine RAAF minelaying operations to areas south of China from June onwards, the number of worthwhile targets for the Catalinas was reduced. Sorties for the month were down to 58, a number of which were carried out from Labuan against Banka Strait. The wing's last minelaying missions of the war took place in July, again in the Banka Strait. In the final months before the Japanese surrender, the Catalinas also delivered propaganda leaflets around the Dutch East Indies and South China Sea, dropping over a million in June alone. No. 76 Wing and its squadrons remained at Darwin in the immediate aftermath of the war, conducting routine patrols, transporting supplies and medicine to prisoners-of-war in the South West Pacific, and assisting in the repatriation of Australian personnel. In November 1945, under a reorganisation of RAAF units at Darwin, the wing headquarters was given orders to disband. It became non-operational on 16 November and was officially dissolved five days later. No. 42 Squadron disbanded the same month, while Nos. 20 and 43 Squadrons transferred to Rathmines, where they disbanded in 1946.
