= Mycobilimbia olivacea =

Scientific classification
- Domain: Eukaryota
- Kingdom: Fungi
- Division: Ascomycota
- Class: Lecanoromycetes
- Order: Lecanorales
- Family: Ramalinaceae
- Genus: Mycobilimbia
- Species: M. olivacea

Binomial name
- Mycobilimbia olivacea Aragón, Sarrión & Hafellner (2003)

Species of lichen

Mycobilimbia olivacea is a species of corticolous and lignicolous (bark- and wood-dwelling) crustose lichen in the family Ramalinaceae. Found in Spain, it was described as a new species in 2003.

== Taxonomy ==
Mycobilimbia olivacea was formally described in 2003 by Francisco José Sarrión, Gregorio Aragón, and Josef Hafellner. The specific epithet olivacea refers to the olive-green colouration of its thallus. While M. olivacea shows some characteristics comparable to the genus Biatora—such as its fruiting body development, and thin-walled spores with smooth epispore—its well-developed thallus and distinctive asci place it within Mycobilimbia.

== Description ==
Mycobilimbia olivacea has a thallus that is crustose (crust-like), continuous, thick, and minutely squamulose, composed of small scales. The thallus is dark green to dark olive-brown in colour. The individual squamules measure 0.2–0.7 mm in diameter, occasionally up to 1 mm, are up to 0.1 mm high, and are typically arranged in a continuous, slightly overlapping pattern. These squamules have flat to convex surfaces with sinuate (wavy) to finely lobulate margins.

The upper cortex is thin, up to 10 μm, consisting of one or two rows of rounded cells with cell interiors 4.5–9 μm wide, pigmented brown to brown-orange at the surface. Within the lichen body is the photobiont layer containing green, chlorococcoid algal cells, 5–9 μm in diameter, arranged in a continuous layer 45–60 μm thick.

The apothecia (fruiting bodies) are numerous, lecideoid to biatorine in form (with disc-like structures), measuring 0.2–0.8 mm in diameter, occasionally up to 1 mm. They are simple, more or less circular to compressed, commonly sessile with a somewhat constricted base. The disc is flat to convex and dark reddish-brown. The excipulum, which is the outer layer of the apothecia, is well-developed, 48–55 μm wide, with reddish-brown pigmented cell walls at the surface. Above the spore-producing layer is the epithecium, which is ochraceous-brown and 5–12 μm high.

The hymenium, or spore-producing layer, is 50–70 μm high, ranging from 45–80 μm, and is colourless. Beneath it lies the hypothecium, which is also 50–70 μm high, occasionally up to 75 μm, colourless, and contains photobiont cells in the inner part. The sterile filaments known as paraphyses are 1.5–2.5 μm wide, sparsely branched and anastomosing, with tips 3–4 μm, occasionally up to 5 μm, that become club-shaped with an orange-brown cap.

The asci are club-shaped, containing eight spores, with a thick apical apparatus that shows a dark blue reaction with K/I (potassium iodide), containing a more densely amyloid tubular pore. The ascospores are arranged in two rows, colourless, single-celled, with smooth epispore, measuring 11–15 μm by 5–6.5 μm, ranging from 9–17 μm by 5–7.5 μm, with a length to width ratio averaging 2.36, elongate to cylindrical or ovoid in shape. No lichen products were detected in this species by thin-layer chromatography. The cortex does not react with any standard chemical spot tests.

== Habitat and distribution ==
Mycobilimbia olivacea is found in Spain at middle to high elevations (900–1750 m) in humid to subhumid meso- and supramediterranean bioclimatic belts. It inhabits two primary ecological niches: the fissures of tree bases in dense Pinus nigra (black pine) formations and the exposed wood (lignum) of Quercus pyrenaica (Pyrenean oak) in southern Iberia. The black pine habitats occur on calcareous mountains in eastern Spain, particularly in the well-preserved forests of Sierra de Segura and Sierra de Alcaraz, while the Pyrenean oak habitats are found on siliceous substrata in Sierra Madrona, in age-structured stands showing little human disturbance. In both environments, M. olivacea associates with various lichen species, suggesting it prefers mature forest ecosystems with stable conditions and minimal recent human influence. A similar, unnamed species (referred to as Mycobilimbia aff. olivacea) was reported from Italy; it differs from the Spanish material in its paler thallus and lack of biseriate asci.
