= No. 20 Squadron RAAF =

Royal Australian Air Force squadron

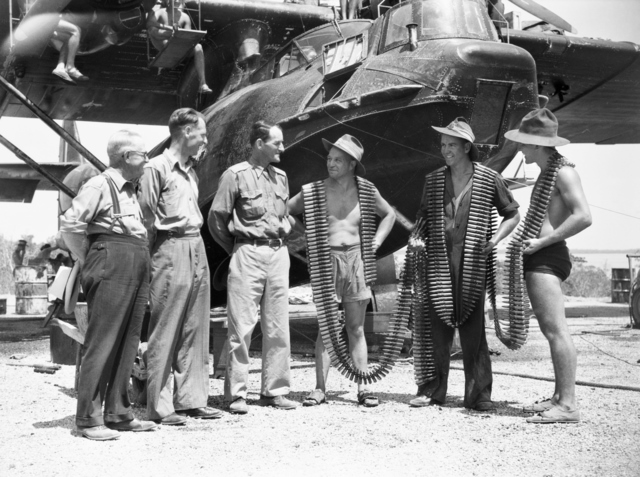
- Personnel of No. 20 Squadron carrying machine-gun belts speak with members of the Parliamentary War Expenditure Committee in Darwin, Northern Territory, October 1944
- Active: 1941–1946; 2015–current
- Country: Australia
- Branch: Royal Australian Air Force
- Role: Airfield support
- Part of: No. 96 Wing, Combat Support Group
- Garrison/HQ: RAAF Base Woomera
- Engagements: World War II: New Guinea Campaign; North Western Area Campaign

Insignia
- Squadron code: RB (1941–1946)

Aircraft flown
- Patrol: PBY Catalina (1941–1946); Short Empire (1941–1942)

No. 20 Squadron is a Royal Australian Air Force (RAAF) support squadron. Coming under the control of No. 96 Wing, it is responsible for the management of the airfield at RAAF Base Woomera, South Australia. The squadron originated as a maritime patrol unit during World War II. Raised in August 1941, it operated PBY Catalina and Short Empire flying boats from bases in New Guinea, Queensland and the Northern Territory, conducting search-and-rescue, mine-laying, anti-submarine and bombing missions against Japanese targets in the Pacific theatre. Following the conclusion of hostilities, the squadron was disbanded in March 1946. It was reactivated as an airfield support squadron in April 2015.

== History ==
=== World War II ===
No. 20 Squadron was formed at Port Moresby, New Guinea, on 1 August 1941 for a general reconnaissance role, under the command of Squadron Leader W.N. Gibson. Its establishment was six PBY Catalina flying boats and 133 personnel, but only five aircraft (all transferred from No. 11 Squadron) and 55 personnel were available initially. The squadron conducted long-range patrols between bases scattered around the islands to Australia's north in conjunction with No. 11 Squadron. On 18 November, No. 20 Squadron's Catalinas were augmented by two Short Empire flying boats transferred from No. 11 Squadron.

On 25 November 1941, following the loss of HMAS Sydney, one of No. 20 Squadron's Catalinas was despatched to Western Australia to join a No. 11 Squadron Catalina in search-and-rescue missions, but they found only oil slicks. By the outbreak of war in the Pacific, No. 20 Squadron had a strength of six Catalinas and two Empire flying boats. Its personnel at the beginning of December numbered 14 officers and 118 men. The squadron undertook its first sortie of the Pacific War on 8 December; a Catalina located three Japanese luggers in the vicinity of Thursday Island, Queensland. Later in the month it commenced anti-submarine patrols and, in January 1942, bombing raids against Japanese bases. As the Japanese advanced into the South West Pacific, No. 20 Squadron was also responsible for evacuating white civilians from areas threatened by invasion. On 21 January, one of its Catalinas located the Japanese fleet steaming for Rabaul and signalled a warning to the town's Australian defenders before being shot down by anti-aircraft fire; it was the squadron's first combat loss.

In the wake of the fall of Rabaul, the Catalinas of Nos. 11 and 20 Squadrons became the RAAF's only offensive weapon against the Japanese. Their raids on Rabaul did little to stem the Japanese advance, and in the following months Port Moresby itself was subjected to increasingly frequent attacks, which destroyed aircraft, facilities, and squadron records. In February 1942, the Short Empires operated by Nos. 11 and 20 Squadrons were transferred to the newly formed No. 33 (Transport) Squadron. No. 20 Squadron lost two Catalinas during patrols on 4 and 6 May; the nine crewmen of the first were later found to have been captured and beheaded; the crew of the second were also captured and subsequently disappeared without trace.

In response to the threat of invasion at Port Moresby, Nos. 11 and 20 Squadrons moved to Bowen, Queensland, on 7 May 1942. They were soon attacking Japanese targets in Lae, Salamaua and Rabaul. On 27 June, each squadron contributed an aircraft to a four-hour raid over Lae and Salamaua during which, as well as bombs, the RAAF crews dropped beer bottles to disrupt the enemy soldiers' sleep—the sound they made falling through the air was, according to the official history, "something between a shrill whistle and a scream". By 1 July, No. 20 Squadron's strength was six Catalinas and 175 personnel, out of a planned establishment of nine aircraft and 415 personnel. Its prime responsibility in early 1942 was maritime reconnaissance as far as New Guinea, the Solomon Islands, and New Caledonia; the latter half of the year saw a greater focus on night bombing. Now comprising 252 officers and men, the squadron relocated to Cairns on 11 November 1942. From Cairns it continued to conduct reconnaissance, anti-submarine and occasional bombing operations over the waters around New Guinea. Between December 1942 and March 1943, No. 20 Squadron's aircraft flew a total of 9,629 hours and dropped 227 tons of bombs. The squadron's role changed in June 1943 when it commenced mine-laying operations over the Netherlands East Indies and the Philippines, though it continued to make some bombing raids and supply drops.

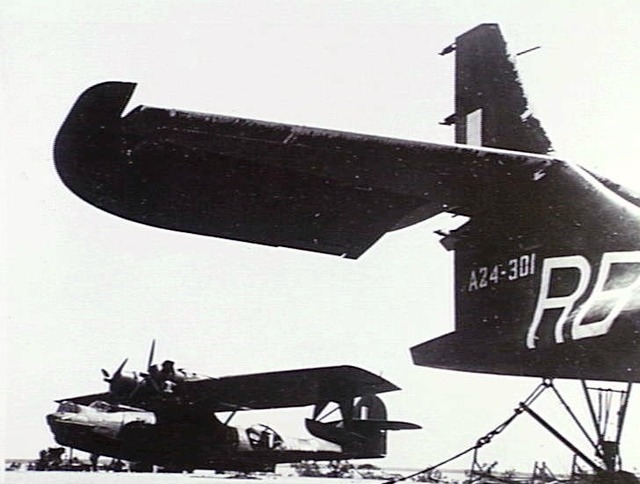
Catalinas of No. 20 Squadron (foreground) and No. 42 Squadron (background)

In September 1944, No. 20 Squadron became part of No. 76 Wing RAAF, along with Nos. 42 and 43 Squadrons, and moved to Darwin, Northern Territory. All three squadrons operated Catalinas, their primary purpose being mine-laying. On the night of 30 September, a Catalina of No. 20 Squadron was shot down while attacking a ship at Pomelaa in the Dutch East Indies; the loss was compounded by the fact that one of the coordinators of the mining campaign, Lieutenant Commander P.E. Carr of the Royal Australian Navy, was aboard the plane and was captured by the Japanese. Another of the squadron's Catalinas went down on the night of 27/28 January 1945, possibly in a cyclone over the Timor Sea, during the campaign to mine Surabaya. In March, a detachment of four No. 20 Squadron aircraft, along with four from No. 43 Squadron, laid mines off the coast of southern China and Taiwan as part of a No. 76 Wing offensive in this area; these operations were conducted from Leyte Gulf in the Philippines. One of No. 20 Squadron's Catalinas was lost on the night of 7/8 March, most likely owing to bad weather rather than enemy action. Three of the squadron's aircraft mined the entrance to Hong Kong harbour on 8 April and, on 26 May, four of its Catalinas mined Wenzhou harbour in China, the furthest north that any Australian aircraft infiltrated during the war in the Pacific. Three of its aircraft flew the RAAF's last mine-laying mission on 30 July.

No. 20 Squadron's final wartime sortie was a patrol on 14 August 1945. Following the end of the war, the squadron operated in the transport role and ferried Australian prisoners of war home from various locations in South East Asia. It relocated to RAAF Station Rathmines, New South Wales, on 21 November. No. 20 Squadron flew its last mission, a transport flight to Balikpapan, on 21 January 1946, and disbanded at Rathmines on 27 March.

=== Post-war re-establishment ===
No. 20 Squadron was reactivated on 1 April 2015 to support airfield operations at RAAF Base Woomera, South Australia. Consisting of nine uniformed personnel and one Australian Public Service member under the command of Squadron Leader Simon Bartlett, the squadron formed part of No. 96 Wing, a component of Combat Support Group (CSG). The airfield had previously been managed under the auspices of Aerospace Operational Support Group, but a command-and-control review commissioned by the Chief of Air Force recommended that, in common with other RAAF airfields, it should be administered by CSG. RAAF Base Woomera, incorporating Woomera Village, was one of two Air Force units formally established on 12 January 2015 as part of a reorganisation of the Woomera Range Complex, the other unit being RAAF Woomera Test Range.

The design of the reactivated squadron's crest includes a wedge-tailed eagle to denote courage and nobility, a woomera spear thrower to symbolise the town and its indigenous heritage, Sturt's Desert Pea to represent South Australia, and the Pleiades star cluster, which features in the folklore of the local Kokatha people.
