= No. 43 Squadron RAAF =

Royal Australian Air Force squadron

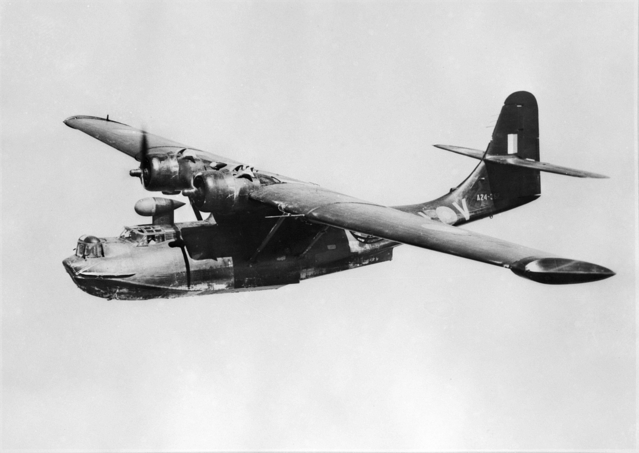
- A No. 43 Squadron Catalina
- Active: 1 May 1943 – 11 March 1946
- Country: Australia
- Branch: Royal Australian Air Force
- Role: Maritime patrol
- Engagements: World War II

Aircraft flown
- Patrol: Consolidated PBY Catalina

No. 43 Squadron was a Royal Australian Air Force (RAAF) maritime patrol and mine-laying squadron that operated during World War II. Raised in early 1943, the squadron flew Catalina aircraft from bases in Queensland and the Northern Territory, flying mine-laying, convoy-protection and bombing sorties against Japanese targets in the Pacific theatre. These operations saw it operate as far north as the Chinese coast. After the conclusion of hostilities, the squadron was disbanded in mid-1946.

== History ==
No. 43 Squadron was formed at Bowen in Queensland on 1 May 1943, initially under the command of Flight Lieutenant I.L. Addison. It subsequently moved to Karumba in August. The squadron's first commanding officer was Squadron Leader Charles Thompson, who took over soon after. Equipped with Catalina aircraft, the squadron flew its first operational patrols on 8 September, with four aircraft conducting strikes against targets in Ambon.

The squadron was initially allocated a general reconnaissance role; however, like all the RAAF's Catalina units the squadron also operated in mine-laying, bombing and supply-dropping roles. As well as flying convoy protection and anti-submarine patrols along the Australian east coast the squadron conducted offensive operations against Japanese shipping in the Solomon Islands and the eastern islands of the Netherlands East Indies, with a detachment maintained at Bowen during this time.

After moving to Darwin in the Northern Territory in April 1944 the squadron became part of No. 76 Wing RAAF along with Nos. 20 and 42 Squadrons. On 10 May 1944, Squadron Leader L.M. Hurt took over as commanding officer, but was soon replaced by Squadron Leader P.J. McMahon in July. After this, they operated almost exclusively in the mine laying role. Operating alongside the other Catalina squadrons, No. 43 Squadron conducted mine laying operations throughout South East Asia, venturing as far as the Philippines, Hong Kong and the Chinese coast. Aircraft from the squadron flew up to 25 hours on such missions, often staging through airfields as far away as Morotai.

The squadron also undertook air-sea rescue operations, supporting long-range Allied bombing missions in the Netherlands East Indies from early 1944. It also undertook harassing operations against Japanese installations and conducted anti-shipping missions. A number of aircraft were lost during these and other operations. One of its most significant actions came on the night of 5/6 April 1945, when three No. 43 Squadron Catalinas shadowed the Japanese cruiser Isuzu, which was subsequently sunk by Allied bombers and submarines. Hurt was replaced as commanding officer by Squadron Leader R.M. Seymour on 19 May 1945.

Following the end of the war No. 43 Squadron performed routine patrol and transport flights until moving to RAAF Base Rathmines in November 1945. On 31 January 1946, Squadron Leader A.R. Emslie was appointed commanding officer. No. 43 Squadron was disbanded at Rathmines on 11 March 1946.
