= Melbourne Bluff =

Rocky bluff at the north side of Heard Island

Melbourne Bluff (53°2′S 73°32′E) is a rocky bluff, 385 metres (1,260 ft) high, standing 1.3 nautical miles (2.4 km) south of Cape Bidlingmaier and protruding above the ice-covered slopes at the north side of Heard Island. The feature was surveyed in 1948 by the Australian National Antarctic Research Expeditions and so named by them because it trends roughly east-northeast in the general direction of Melbourne, Australia, the home headquarters of the expedition.
