= Mycobilimbia meridionalis =

Scientific classification
- Kingdom: Fungi
- Division: Ascomycota
- Class: Lecanoromycetes
- Order: Lecanorales
- Family: Ramalinaceae
- Genus: Mycobilimbia
- Species: M. meridionalis

Binomial name
- Mycobilimbia meridionalis Kantvilas (2005)

Species of lichen-forming fungus

Mycobilimbia meridionalis is a species of lichen-forming fungus in the family Ramalinaceae. It is found in Tasmania, where it grows on mossy soil mounds in mixed forest. It was formally described as a new species in 2005 by the lichenologist Gintaras Kantvilas.
