= Erratic Point =

Cape on Heard Island in the southern Indian Ocean

Coordinates: 53°4′S 73°22′E

Erratic Point is a small, moss-covered point at the head of South West Bay, 1.3 nautical miles (2.4 km) northeast of Cape Gazert, on the west side of Heard Island in the southern Indian Ocean. The First German Antarctica Expedition in 1902 charted a cape in this vicinity, from the summit of Mount Drygalski, and applied the name "Kap Lerche." In November 1929 the British Australian and New Zealand Antarctic Research Expedition under Douglas Mawson charted a small point in this position and applied the name "Erratic Point" because of the large number of massive erratic boulders encountered there. The Australian National Antarctic Research Expedition was unable to find any significant feature in this immediate area during their 1948 survey of the island, hence the name Erratic Point was retained by them for this small point.
