= Mycobilimbia parvilobulosa =

Scientific classification
- Domain: Eukaryota
- Kingdom: Fungi
- Division: Ascomycota
- Class: Lecanoromycetes
- Order: Lecanorales
- Family: Ramalinaceae
- Genus: Mycobilimbia
- Species: M. parvilobulosa

Binomial name
- Mycobilimbia parvilobulosa Sarrión, Aragón & Hafellner (2003)

Species of lichen

Mycobilimbia parvilobulosa is a species of corticolous (bark-dwelling) crustose lichen in the family Ramalinaceae. Found in southern Spain, it was first described in 2003. This small organism grows primarily on the bark of oak trees in undisturbed woodland habitats, especially near the base of trees where it often covers mosses. It can be recognized by its whitish to greenish-grey crust-like body with distinctive small, scalloped or finger-like lobes, and its dark brown fruiting bodies. The species is considered rare, having been found in only a small number of forest locations during ecological surveys.

== Taxonomy ==
Mycobilimbia parvilobulosa was first formally described in 2003 by Francisco José Sarrión, Gregorio Aragón, and Josef Hafellner. The specific epithet parvilobulosa refers to the small (Latin: parvus) lobes that characterize the thallus of this species. The holotype specimen was collected on 4 February 1997, by A.R. Burgaz, I. Martínez and F.J. Sarrión at Baños de las Tiñosas, Solana del Pino (Ciudad Real province) at 800 m elevation, growing at the base of Quercus faginea.

Mycobilimbia parvilobulosa is closely related to M. berengeriana, but differs markedly in its thallus morphology, specifically its squamulose thallus with crenate (scalloped) to somewhat digitiform (fingerlike) margins, as well as its dark reddish-brown excipulum and colourless epithecium.

== Description ==
Mycobilimbia parvilobulosa has a thallus that is crustose (crust-like), widespread to continuous and imbricate (overlapping), thick, and granulose to minutely squamulose in texture. The thallus is whitish to greenish-grey in colour. The granules measure 0.07–0.17 mm wide and develop into minute squamules that are 0.2–0.8 mm wide and 0.15–0.2 mm high. These squamules have flat surfaces with margins that are crenate (scalloped) to subdigitiform (somewhat finger-like), and they are weakly corticate (having a thin outer cortex).

The upper cortex is thin, up to 15 μm, surrounded by a closely compacted layer of hyphae (fungal filaments) of 1–3 μm diameter. The photobiont layer contains green, chlorococcoid algal cells measuring 8–15 μm in diameter, arranged in a continuous layer 55–75 μm thick. The medulla consists of loose hyphae, 2–4 μm in diameter, which project into the substrate below the squamules.

The apothecia (fruiting bodies) are numerous, lecideoid to biatorine in form (having disc-like structures), measuring 0.3–1 mm in diameter. They are simple, more or less circular to compressed, with a somewhat constricted base. The disc is flat to convex and dark brown. The margin is thick and darker initially, later becoming excluded as the apothecia sometimes develop a tuberculate (warty) appearance.

The excipulum, which forms the outer layer of the apothecia, consists of radiating hyphae with thick, reddish-brown walls that are darker in the outer part. The inner cells in contact with the hypothecium have lumina (cell interiors) measuring 6–11 by 1–2 μm, while the outer cells are swollen and darker with lumina measuring 7–9 by 4–6 μm. The epithecium (upper layer of the hymenium) is colourless, with sparse orange gelatinous granules on the surface. The hymenium (spore-producing layer) measures 60–70 μm high (ranging from 50–75 μm) and is colourless. The hypothecium (tissue beneath the hymenium) is 60–75 μm high (ranging from 55–80 μm) and dark reddish-brown.

The paraphyses (sterile filaments) are 2–2.5 μm wide, mostly simple, with tips that are 4–5 μm wide and become clavate (club-shaped) or capitate (having a distinct head). The asci are clavate, containing eight spores, with an apical apparatus typical of the genus Mycobilimbia. The ascospores are arranged in one or two rows, colourless, unicellular, with a finely warted epispore, measuring 11–14 μm by 4–6 μm (ranging from 9.5–16.5 μm by 4–6 μm), with a length to width ratio averaging 2.4, and are ellipsoid to fusiform in shape. No lichen substances were detected in Mycobilimbia parvilobulosa by thin-layer chromatography. The cortex shows no reaction or a slight yellow reaction with potassium hydroxide solution (K− or K± yellow).

== Habitat and distribution ==
Mycobilimbia parvilobulosa inhabits the hyperhumid to subhumid meso- and supramediterranean bioclimatic belts of southern Spain, primarily growing on old fagaceous tree trunks near their bases and typically overgrowing bryophytes in undisturbed woodland habitats. The species occurs across diverse ecological settings: in Sierra Madrona and Montes de Toledo on Quercus faginea subsp. broteroi in narrow siliceous valleys; in Sierra de Segura and Sierra de Alcaraz on Q. faginea subsp. faginea and Q. ilex subsp. ballota in limestone valleys and ravines; and in Cádiz province on Q. faginea in relict pinsapo fir forests. Its consistent association with old-growth indicator lichens like Lobaria pulmonaria, Nephroma laevigatum, and various Fuscopannaria and Leptogium species suggests M. parvilobulosa is an ecological indicator of forest antiquity and stability, preferring sites with minimal human disturbance. In a 2016 study of fragmented Mediterranean forests, it was shown to be one of the least common species, having been found in only a single forest plot (of 40).
