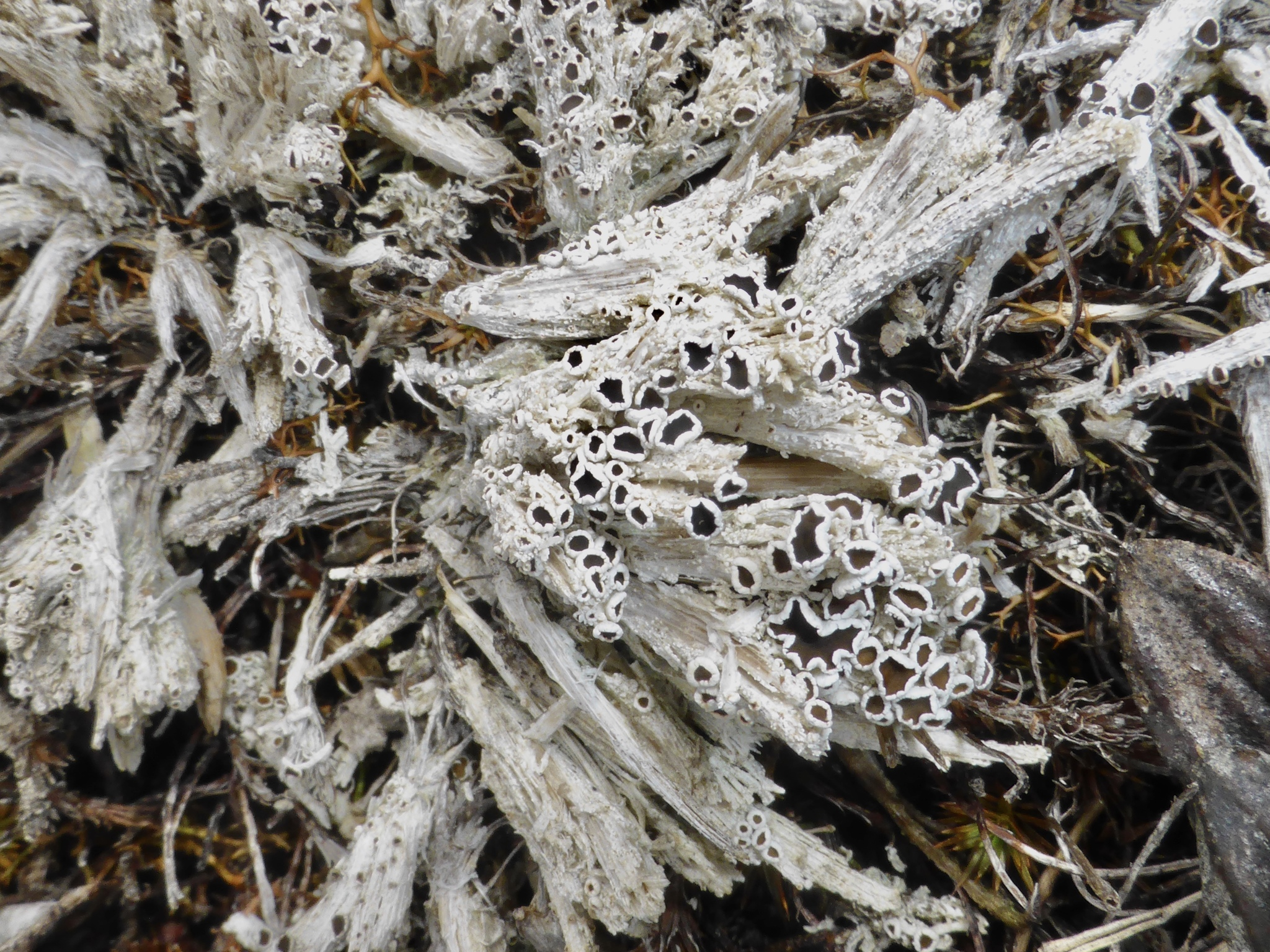
- Lecanora epibryon in Lake Hāwea

Conservation status
- Secure (NatureServe)

Scientific classification
- Kingdom: Fungi
- Division: Ascomycota
- Class: Lecanoromycetes
- Order: Lecanorales
- Family: Lecanoraceae
- Genus: Lecanora
- Species: L. epibryon

Binomial name
- Lecanora epibryon (Ach.) Ach. (1810)

= Lecanora epibryon =

Species of fungi

Lecanora epibryon is a species of crustose lichen. It is known from Europe, New Zealand, and Antarctica.

== Description ==
The thallus is thin and white. The apothecia are crowded and yellow to black.

== Range ==
This species is known from New Zealand and Antarctica. The lectotype is from Mt Tapuaenuku.

== Habitat ==
This lichen is graminicolous (dead tussock bases) and terricolous.

== Taxonomy ==
Lecanora epibryon contains the following subspecies:

- Lecanora epibryon subsp. xanthophora
- Lecanora epibryon subsp. broccha

Both of these species are considered Not Threatened under the New Zealand Threat Classification System.

The nominate subspecies is found in Europe, among other places. In the original description, it is noted as being found in Austria and Switzerland.
