= No. 42 Squadron RAAF =

Royal Australian Air Force squadron

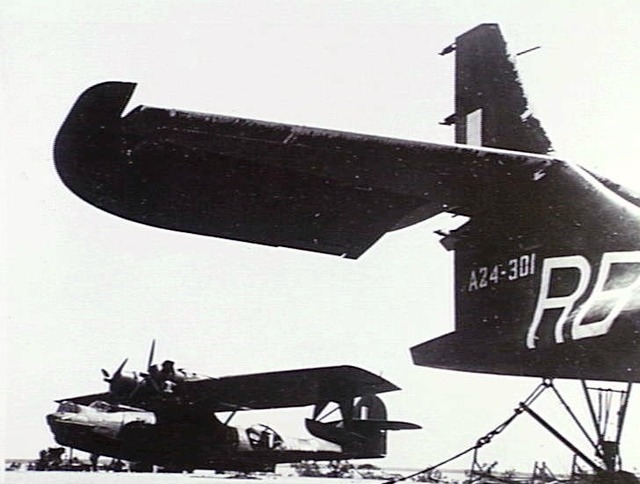
- A No. 42 Squadron Catalina (left) with a No. 20 Squadron Catalina (right)
- Active: 1944–1945
- Country: Australia
- Branch: Royal Australian Air Force
- Role: Mine laying; maritime patrol
- Engagements: World War II: North Western Area Campaign

Insignia
- Squadron code: RK

Aircraft flown
- Patrol: PBY Catalina

No. 42 Squadron was a Royal Australian Air Force (RAAF) mine laying and maritime patrol squadron of World War II formed in June 1944. It conducted patrol and mine-laying operations over the Netherlands East Indies (NEI) from August 1944 until the war ended a year later. It also conducted operations in the waters off southern China in early 1945. Following the Japanese surrender, the squadron performed transport and reconnaissance flights until it was disbanded in November 1945.

== History ==
No. 42 Squadron was formed at Darwin in Australia’s Northern Territory on 1 June 1944. In early July, the squadron’s 50 personnel moved to Melville Bay aboard USS John Owen, arriving there on the 11th of the month. During July, No. 42 Squadron was expanded to a strength of 300 personnel, and it received its PBY Catalina flying boats and further personnel in August. The unit conducted its first operation on 27 August when three Catalinas flew patrols searching for shipping.

During 1944 RAAF Catalinas based in northern Australia conducted a highly successful minelaying campaign against Japanese shipping in the NEI, which formed part of the North Western Area Campaign. In order to expand this campaign, Air Vice Marshal William Bostock, the commander of RAAF Command, ordered the Catalina-equipped No. 20, No. 42 and No. 43 Squadrons be assigned solely to minelaying under the command of No. 76 Wing.

No. 42 Squadron commenced minelaying operations in September 1944, laying mines off Celebes. Here it suffered its first loss on 23 September when a Catalina made a forced landing in Japanese-controlled territory; the aircraft’s crew were later rescued by a No. 43 Squadron Catalina. The squadron focused on laying mines off Makassar and Pare Pare Bay in Celebes during October, and lost two aircraft to Japanese anti-aircraft guns. In November a detachment of aircraft was deployed to Morotai in the NEI, which had been captured by Allied forces in mid-September. From here they flew minelaying operations against Brunei Bay, Tarakan, Sandakan, and the Balabac Straits. Later in 1944, seven No. 42 Squadron Catalinas were deployed to Leyte in the Philippines from where they mined Manila Bay on the night of 14/15 December.

In January and February 1945, No. 42 Squadron and the other units of No. 76 Wing focused on laying mines off Surabaya and the Laoet Straits. One of the squadron’s Catalinas was forced to make an emergency sea landing on 14 January after being damaged by Japanese anti-aircraft fire, but its crew was rescued by an aircraft from No. 43 Squadron. From March to May detachments of No. 42 Squadron aircraft laid mines off the coast of southern China and Formosa as part of a No. 76 Wing offensive in this area; these operations were conducted from Jinamoc Seaplane Base in Leyte Gulf with aircraft refuelling at Lingayen Gulf in Luzon while en route to their targets. During June No. 42 Squadron aircraft flying from Jinamoc Island via a refuelling base which had been established at Brunei Bay laid mines off Sumatra while some of its other Catalinas mined Surabaya. Following this, the squadron’s aircraft were mainly used to conduct harassment raids on Japanese air bases in south-west Celebes, though they also attacked shipping in the Flores Sea and Banda Sea.

No. 42 Squadron assisted in the repatriation of Australian prisoners of war from Manila and other Australian personnel from Labuan following the Japanese surrender.

In October 1945, one of the squadron’s Catalinas, A24-365, was lost during a non-operational flight from Melville Bay to Manila undertaken to collect recently liberated Australian prisoners of war. While manoeuvring for a multiple-drift wind finding at approximately 0300 hours on 10 October, the aircraft is believed to have stalled and crashed into the sea at position 07°57′N 126°53′E, south-east of Mindanao. The crew comprised Flight Lieutenant Ronald Ross Carter (pilot), Flight Lieutenant William Havilah Williams (second pilot), Flying Officer Ronald Patterson Condie (navigator), Flight Sergeant Edgar Bruce Edwards (wireless air gunner), Flight Sergeant John Richard White (wireless air gunner), Warrant Officer Stewart Arthur Evans (flight engineer), and Sergeant Torrens Archibald Hawkes (fitter IIA/air gunner). Several members of the crew survived the impact and were rescued by United States naval forces.

The squadron also conducted several reconnaissance flights over Japanese-occupied islands. No. 42 Squadron was disbanded at Melville Bay on 30 November 1945. During its existence it conducted 396 operational sorties, during which its aircraft dropped 549 tons of mines and 17 tons of bombs. The squadron also flew 6,330 hours of transport and courier flights. During these operations it lost very few aircraft.
