= Saddle Point =

Rocky point on the north coast of Heard Island in the Antarctic

Saddle Point (53°1′S 73°29′E) is a rocky point separating Corinthian Bay and Mechanics Bay on the north coast of Heard Island in the Antarctic.

The terminus of Challenger Glacier is located at the eastern side of Corinthian Bay, close west to Saddle Point. To the east of Challenger Glacier is Downes Glacier, whose terminus is located at Mechanics Bay, between Saddle Point and Cape Bidlingmaier.

== Naming ==
The name was applied by American sealers at Heard Island following their initiation of sealing there in 1855.
