= Mount Drygalski =

Mountain on Heard Island

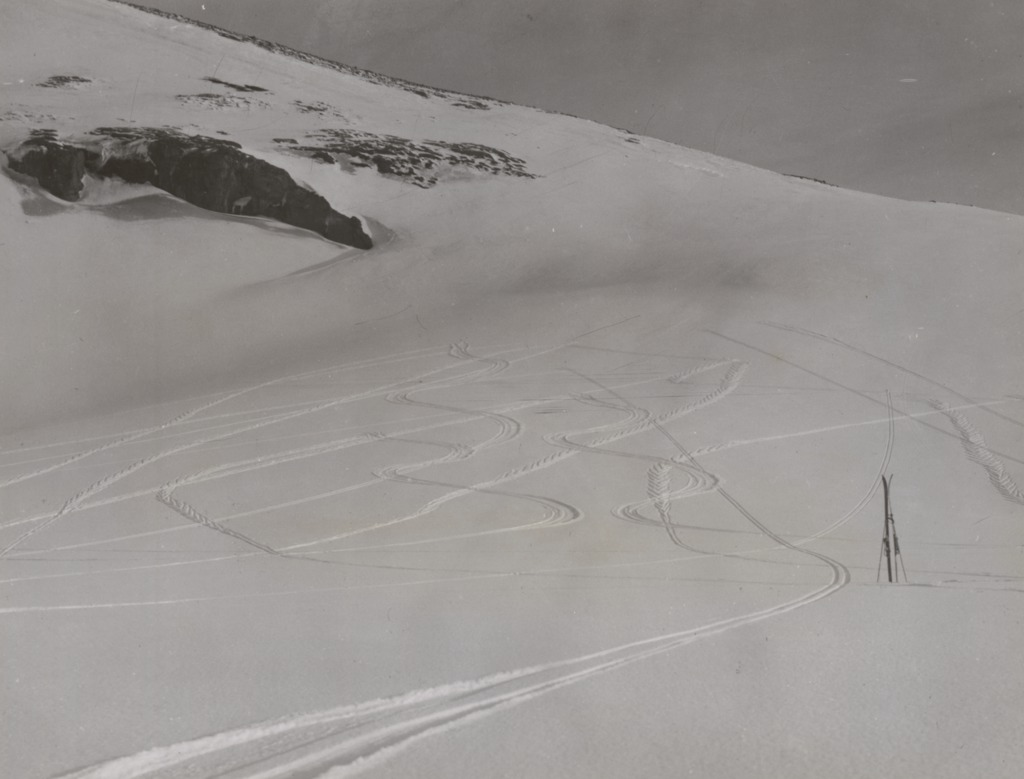
- Sub-Antarctic ski run on the slopes of Mt. Drygalski, Heard Island, Antarctica

Highest point
- Elevation: 210 m (690 ft)
- Coordinates: 53°2′S 73°23′E

Geography
- Location within Indian Ocean
- Location: Heard Island, Southern Indian Ocean

Mount Drygalski is an ice-free hill, 210 metres (700 ft) high, standing 0.7 nautical miles (1.3 km; 0.8 mi) southeast of Atlas Cove, near the northwest end of Heard Island in the southern Indian Ocean. The feature appears to have been roughly charted on an 1882 sketch map compiled by Ensign Washington Irving Chambers aboard the USS Marion during the rescue of the shipwrecked crew of the American sealing bark Trinity. It was more accurately charted and named by the First German Antarctica Expedition in 1902. Professor Erich von Drygalski, the leader of the German Expedition, was a member of the landing party which investigated the area between Rogers Head and the summit of this feature.
