= Tim Ealey =

Australian biologist (1927–2020)

Eric Herbert Mitchell "Tim" Ealey, 29 March 1927—21 October 2020, was an Australian biologist, known for his contributions to science, the environment and conservation awareness and was the recipient of a Medal of the Order of Australia. Ealey has received international recognition for his works, and nationally acknowledged for a program that involved schools in rehabilitation of the environment. Ealey was commemorated in the specific epithet of a tiny marsupial, Ningaui timealeyi, he discovered in the Pilbara region of Western Australia. Amongst his works was research on the monotreme family of Tachyglossidae, the species of echidnas. Ealey worked for the Antarctic Division in the 1950s, researching the fauna of Heard Island. The Ealey Glacier there is named after him.
