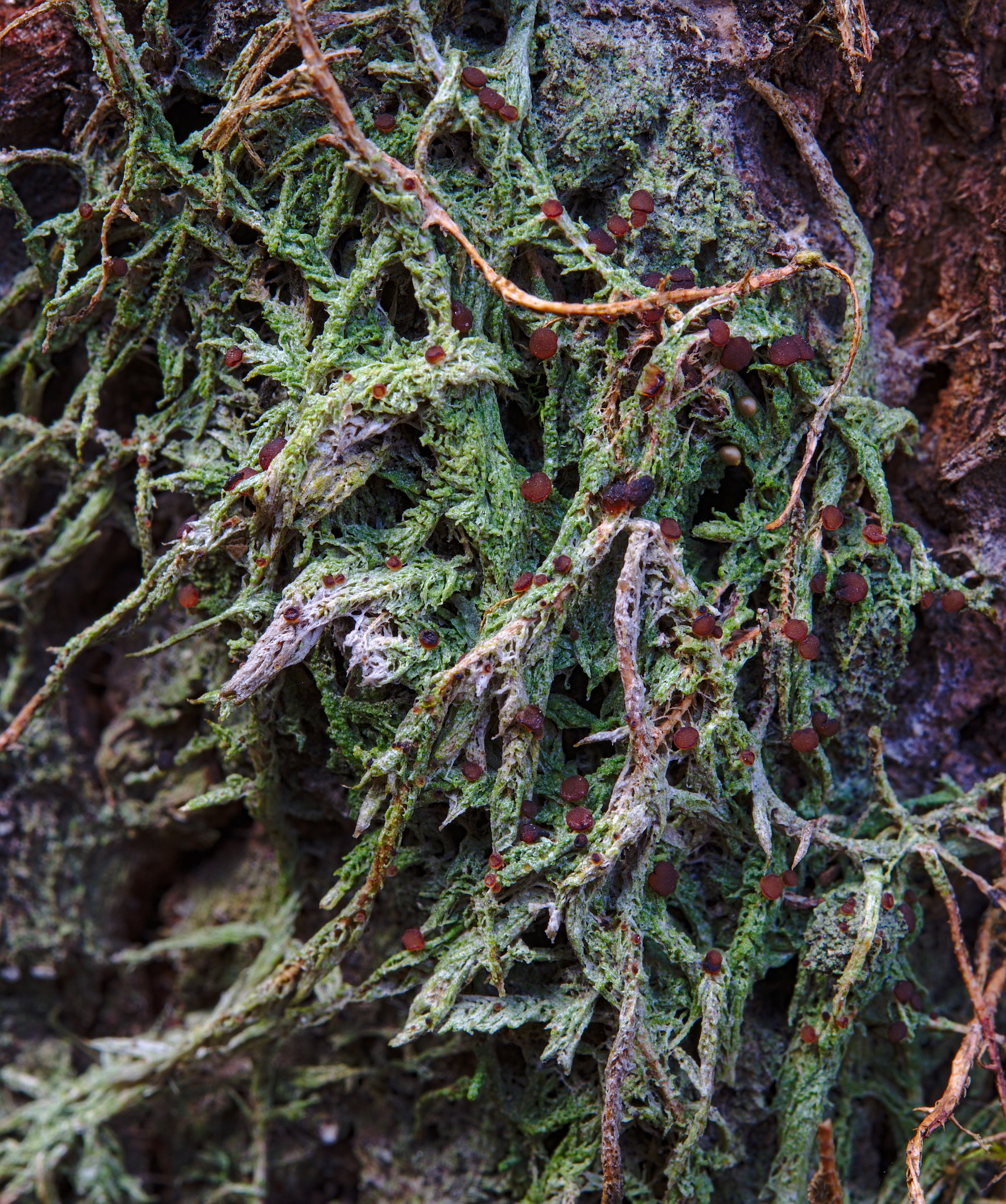
- Mycobilimbia obscurata

Scientific classification
- Kingdom: Fungi
- Division: Ascomycota
- Class: Lecanoromycetes
- Order: Lecanorales
- Family: Ramalinaceae
- Genus: Mycobilimbia; Rehm (1890)

Type species
- Mycobilimbia obscurata (Sommerf.) Rehm (1890)

= Mycobilimbia =

Genus of lichen

Mycobilimbia is a genus of lichen-forming fungi in the family Ramalinaceae. These lichens are characterized by their crust-like growth form that appears as a thin layer on various surfaces, ranging in colour from creamy white to greenish-grey. The genus was proposed by the German lichenologist Heinrich Rehm in 1890. Mycobilimbia species can be identified by their distinctive reproductive structures (apothecia) that start as flat discs and later become convex bumps, typically in beige to reddish-brown colours.

== Taxonomy ==
The genus was circumscribed by the German lichenologist Heinrich Rehm in 1890, with Mycobilimbia obscurata assigned as the type species.

== Description ==
Mycobilimbia has a crustose (crust-like) thallus, which is typically spread out (effuse) and sometimes partly membranous. The surface of the thallus is usually cracked (rimose) and varies in colour from creamy white to dull green, glaucous green, or green-grey. The thallus generally lacks a distinct outer cortex layer (ecorticate) and may occasionally produce powdery reproductive structures called soredia. These lichens do not form a visible prothallus (an initial growth stage visible at the margins). Their photosynthetic partner (photobiont) belongs to the chlorococcoid group of green algae.

The reproductive structures (ascomata) take the form of apothecia, which are cup or disc-shaped and lack a carbonised outer wall (biatorine). These apothecia are either attached to the surface (sessile) or flattened against it (appressed). They typically develop from an initially flat disc with a shallow margin to become weakly or strongly convex without a visible margin. Colours range from light beige to dark reddish-brown or khaki, with the margin eventually disappearing as the apothecium matures.

The true exciple (the tissue forming the rim of the apothecium) consists of radiating, branched, and interconnected (anastomosing) fungal filaments (hyphae). The hymenium (fertile layer where spores are produced) measures 60–90 μm in height and typically lacks a well-defined epithecium (upper layer), though it may show pale pigmentation in the upper portion. When treated with iodine, the hymenium stains red-brown in young specimens and blue in older dried collections.

Below the hymenium lies a distinct subhymenium (supporting layer), which appears somewhat opaque due to the presence of spore-producing hyphae and is often slightly darker than the hymenium itself. The hypothecium (layer beneath the subhymenium) has a cartilage-like (chondroid) texture composed of interwoven hyphae with cell cavities (lumina) 1–2 μm in diameter, embedded in a dense gel matrix.

The hamathecium (sterile tissue between asci) consists of coherent paraphyses (sterile filaments) when observed in potassium hydroxide solution (K). These paraphyses have cell cavities 0.5–2.5 μm in diameter, are unbranched or sparingly branched, and rarely interconnected. Their tips are slightly swollen (with cell cavities up to 5 μm in diameter) but never topped by a distinct apical "cap" or "hood".

The asci (spore-producing cells) each contain eight spores and are cylindrical to club-shaped (cylindric-clavate) with lateral walls 0.7–1 μm thick. They conform to the Biatora-type, with distinctive staining properties when treated with potassium iodide (K/I): a blue apical dome penetrated from below by a narrow, non-staining apical cushion surrounded by a narrow, deeply blue-staining zone. The wall itself does not stain, but is surrounded by an outer layer that stains red-brown with iodine and blue with potassium iodide.

The ascospores are colourless and vary in shape from ellipsoidal or cylindrical to thread-like (filiform) or cylindric-fusiform. They typically have 1 to 3 cross-walls (septa), though occasionally none, and feature a smooth surface without a distinct outer covering (perispore). Asexual reproductive structures (conidiomata) have not been observed to occur in this genus.

Chemically, Mycobilimbia species do not produce secondary metabolites (lichen products) that can be detected using thin-layer chromatography.

== Species ==
As of March 2025, Species Fungorum (in the Catalogue of Life), accept nine species of Mycobilimbia.

- Mycobilimbia austrocalifornica (Zahlbr.) Knudsen (2005)
- Mycobilimbia meridionalis Kantvilas (2005)
- Mycobilimbia obscurata (Sommerf.) Rehm (1890)
- Mycobilimbia olivacea Aragón, Sarrión & Hafellner (2003)
- Mycobilimbia parvilobulosa Sarrión, Aragón & Hafellner (2003)
- Mycobilimbia ramea (S.Ekman) S.Y.Kondr. (2019)
- Mycobilimbia sphaeroides (Dicks.) S.Ekman & Printzen (2021)
- Mycobilimbia subbyssoidea Øvstedal (2008)
- Mycobilimbia territorialis P.M.McCarthy & Elix (2016) – Australia
- Mycobilimbia violascens (Kalb & Vězda) Kalb (2011)
