= Campbell Peak =

Mountain on Heard Island

Campbell Peak (53°6′S 73°32′E) is a peak, 2,415 metres (7,920 ft) high, standing 1.2 nautical miles (2.2 km) northeast of Mawson Peak, the summit of Heard Island. It was surveyed in 1948 by the Australian National Antarctic Research Expeditions (ANARE), who named it for Group-Captain Stuart Campbell, Royal Australian Air Force. Campbell visited Heard Island in 1929 as aircraft pilot with the British Australian and New Zealand Antarctic Research Expedition led by Douglas Mawson, and again as leader of ANARE when a research station was established on the island in December 1947.
