= North West Cornice =

Ridge on Heard Island in the southern Indian Ocean

North West Cornice (53°4′S 73°26′E) is a narrow rock ridge descending in a northwest direction from Big Ben on Heard Island, and terminating at Schmidt Glacier in the northwest part of the island. Surveyed and given this descriptive name by ANARE (Australian National Antarctic Research Expeditions) in 1948. Click here to see a map of North West Cornice and the northwestern coast of Heard Island.
