= Rogers Head =

Headland of Heard Island in Antarctica

- Headland
- Interactive map of Rogers Head
- Coordinates: 53°0′S 73°24′E
- Location: Heard Island, Antarctica
- Etymology: Rogers family of New London, Connecticut, including Erasmus and James

Rogers Head (53°0′S 73°24′E) is a conspicuous headland marking the north extremity of the peninsula between Atlas Cove and Corinthian Bay on the north coast of Heard Island. Named for the Rogers family of New London, Connecticut, including Captain Erasmus Darwin Rogers, who in 1855 made the first landing on Heard Island in the ship Corinthian, Captain James H. Rogers, master of the brig Zoe, and Henry Rogers, first mate of the Zoe, who in 1856 was leader of the first party to winter on the island. The name appears on an early manuscript map compiled by American sealers.
