= Atlas Cove =

Inlet on Heard Island

Coordinates: 53.024348°S 73.386810°E

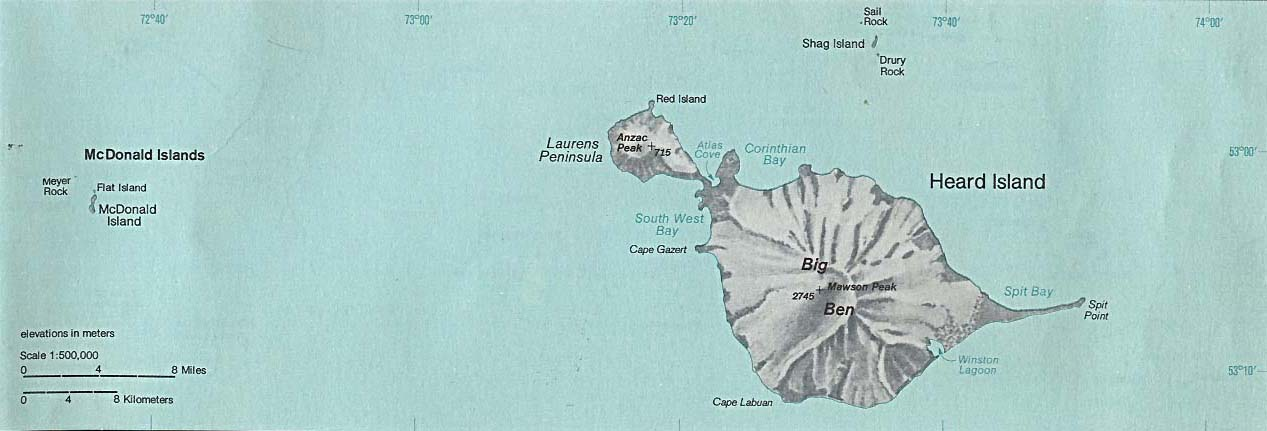
Map of Heard Island and McDonald Islands in the Indian Ocean.

Atlas Cove is a cove on the north coast of Heard Island and McDonald Islands in the southern Indian Ocean, and is entered between the base of the Laurens Peninsula and Rogers Head.

It was named by American sealers after the schooner seal hunting fleet which landed at Heard Island in 1855.

The name appears on a chart by the Challenger expedition under George Nares, which visited the island in HMS Challenger in 1874 and utilized the names then in use by the sealers.

From 1947 to 1955, Atlas Cove was the site of camps of visiting scientists.

In 1969, it was again occupied by American scientists. The settlement was expanded in 1971 by French scientists.

Mapping was updated in 2000.
