= Cape Bidlingmaier =

Cape on Heard Island in the Indian Ocean

Cape Bidlingmaier (53°1′S 73°32′E) is a rocky cape at the east side of the entrance to Mechanics Bay, on the north side of Heard Island in the southern Indian Ocean. The feature appears to have been known to American sealers as Morgan's Point, as shown by Captain H.C. Chester's 1860 sketch map of the island. The name Negros Head was also in use by American sealers during the 1860–1870 period. The name Bidlingmaier was applied by the First German Antarctica Expedition, under Erich von Drygalski, who made a running survey and landing along the north side of the island in 1902. Friedrich Bidlingmaier served as magnetician and meteorologist with the expedition.

== Map ==
Heard Island and McDonald Islands, including all major topographical features
