= Corinthian Bay =

Bay on the coast of Heard Island in the Indian Ocean

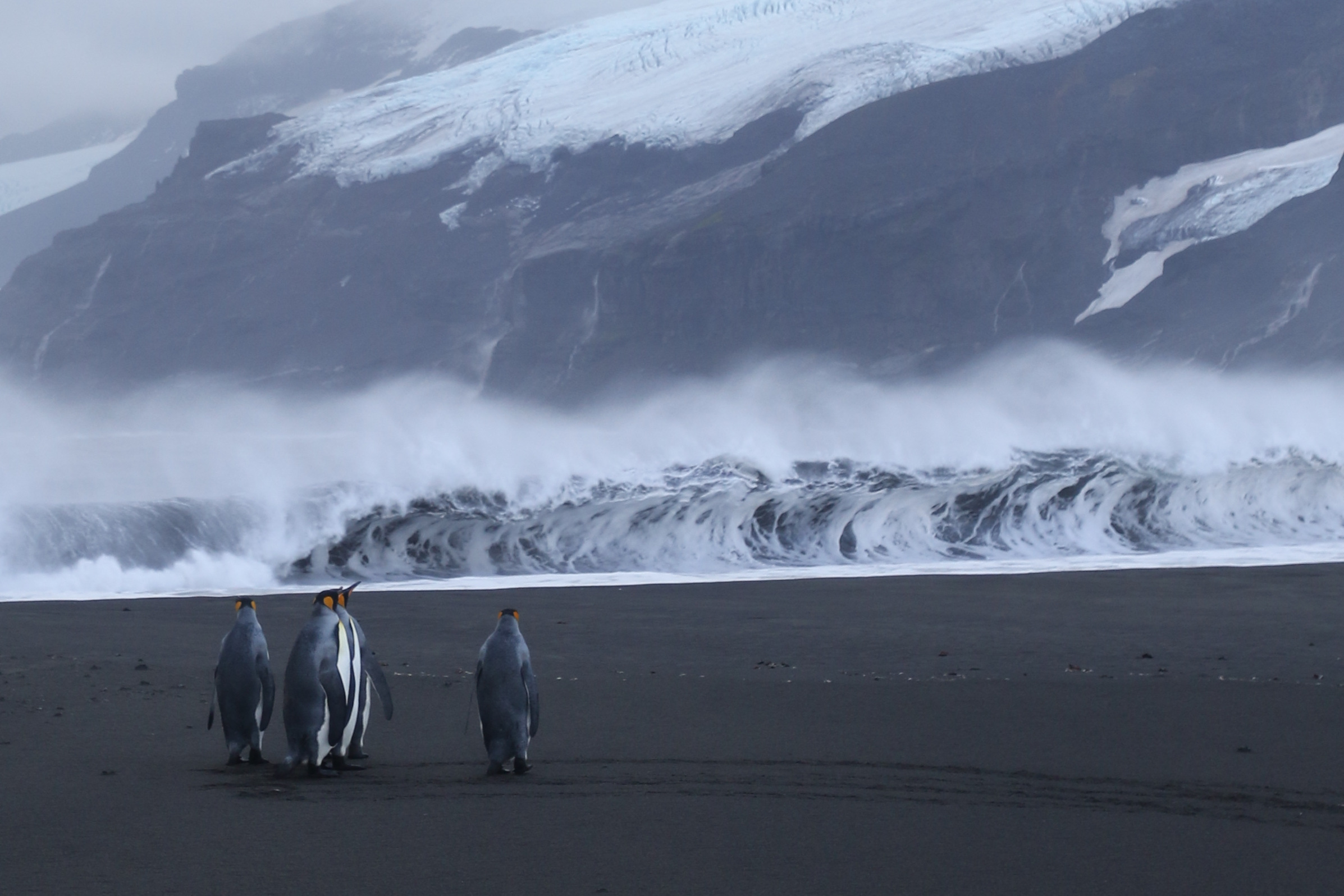
King penguins at Corinthian Bay

Corinthian Bay (53°1′S 73°27′E) is a bay, which is 3 miles (5 km) wide and recedes 1.5 miles (2.4 km), entered between Rogers Head and Saddle Point on the north coast of Heard Island in the southern Indian Ocean. The name appears on an early chart compiled by American sealers. It was probably given by Captain Erasmus Darwin Rogers, American whaler and sealer, after his vessel Corinthian in which he made the first landing on Heard Island in March 1855. Nearby features include Corinth Head.
