= Cape Gazert =

Cape on Heard Island in the southern Indian Ocean

Cape Gazert (53°5′S 73°21′E) is a cape at the western end of the rocky promontory which forms the south side of South West Bay, on the west side of Heard Island in the southern Indian Ocean. This feature was known to American sealers as "Green Point", as shown by Captain H.C. Chester's 1860 sketch map and other sealer maps of the period. The present name was applied by the First German Antarctica Expedition when they landed at the feature in February 1902, after Doctor Hans Gazert, medical officer with the expedition, and it has become established in international usage.
