= Mechanics Bay (Heard Island) =

Bay on the north coast of Heard Island in the southern Indian Ocean

Coordinates: 53°1′S 73°31′E

Mechanics Bay is a bay, 1 nautical mile (2 km) wide, lying immediately east of Saddle Point on the north coast of Heard Island in the southern Indian Ocean. It was named by American sealers after the schooner Mechanic, a tender to the Corinthian in Captain Erasmus Darwin Rogers' sealing fleet which landed at Heard Island in 1855.

== Map ==
- Heard Island and McDonald Islands
