= South West Bay =

Bay on Heard Island in the southern Indian Ocean

South West Bay (53°3′S 73°22′E) is an open bay indenting the west side of Heard Island immediately north of Cape Gazert in the southern Indian Ocean. The bay was roughly charted on an 1860 sketch map compiled by Captain H.C. Chester, an American sealer. The name "S.W. Bay" appears on an 1882 chart compiled by Ens. Washington Irving Chambers aboard the USS Marion at Heard Island in January 1882. The bay name appears to have developed from an American sealer name, "Southwest Beach," in use about 1860 for the pebble beach at the north end of this bay.
