= Gauss expedition =

1901–1903 German expedition to Antarctica

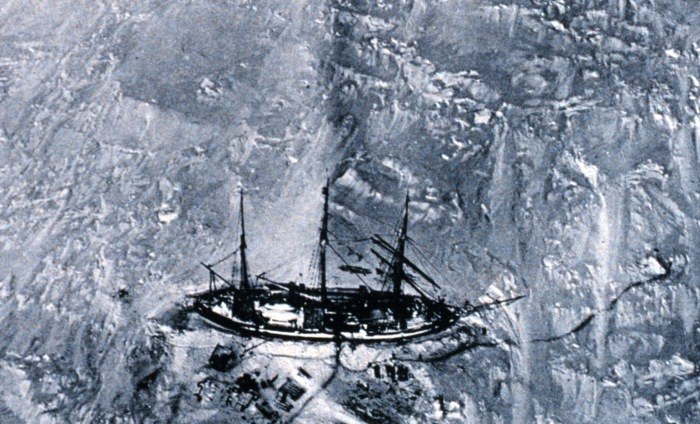
Gauss enclosed in the ice, seen from a tethered balloon

The Gauss expedition of 1901–1903 (also known as the Deutsche Südpolar-Expedition 1901–1903) was the first German expedition to Antarctica. It was led by geologist Erich von Drygalski in the ship Gauss, named after the mathematician and physicist Carl Friedrich Gauss.

== Voyage ==
Drygalski led the first German South Polar expedition with the ship Gauss to explore the unknown area of Antarctica lying south of the Kerguelen Islands. The expedition started from Kiel on 11 August 1901.

== Expedition ==
A small party of the expedition was also stationed on the Kerguelen Islands, while the main party proceeded further south. Erich von Drygalski paid a brief call to Heard Island and provided the first comprehensive scientific information on the island's geology, flora, and fauna.

Despite their entrapment in the ice for nearly 14 months (until February 1903), new territory was discovered: Kaiser Wilhelm II Land and its volcano—Gaussberg.

Drygalski was the first to use a gas balloon in Antarctica.

== Return ==
The expedition arrived back in Kiel in November 1903. Subsequently, Erich von Drygalski wrote the narrative of the expedition and edited the voluminous scientific data. Between 1905 and 1931, he published the 20 volumes and two atlases documenting the expedition.

== See also ==
- Heroic Age of Antarctic Exploration
- List of Antarctic expeditions
- Second German Antarctic Expedition
- Gunther Plüschow
- Feuerland
