= Lee Island =

Island off East Antarctica, Mac-Robertson-Land

- Location within Antarctica

Geography
- Location: Antarctica
- Coordinates: 67°35′S 62°52′E

Administration
- Administered under the Antarctic Treaty System

Demographics
- Population: Uninhabited

Lee Island is an island just west of Teyssier Island, Verner Island, and Petersen Island, just east of Kista Strait, Stinear Island, and Béchervaise Island, and just south of Moller Bank and Carstens Shoal, in Holme Bay, Mac. Robertson Land, Antarctica. It was mapped by Norwegian cartographers from air photos taken by the Lars Christensen Expedition, 1936–37, and was named by the Antarctic Names Committee of Australia for R.T. Lee, a diesel mechanic at nearby Mawson Station in 1957.

== See also ==
- List of Antarctic and sub-Antarctic islands
