= Heard Island glaciers =

Glaciers in the southern Indian Ocean

Coordinates: 53.1°S 73.516667°E

The Heard Island glaciers covered 79% of Heard Island itself, in 1947, covering 288 km^{2}; by 1988, this had decreased by 11% to 257 km^{2}. The glaciers fall under the Antarctic Environmental Gradient, which spans 30 degrees of latitude and includes a range of macro-climatic zones from cool temperate islands to the frigid and arid Antarctic continent. Glaciers extend from 2745 m to sea level, with ice up to 150 m deep. The geologic movement of the glaciers can appear fast-flowing due to the steep slope and high precipitation, and are particularly sensitive to climatic fluctuations. Measurements between 1947 and 1980 show glacial retreat, particularly on the eastern flanks, is correlated with changes in weather patterns.

A 29% reduction in area of the Brown Glacier from 1947 to 2003 was observed. The volcano Big Ben, from which all the glaciers drain, has shown no sign of changing geothermal output to cause the melting; 1 °C of warming has occurred over the same time period. Glaciologists continue to study the Brown Glacier, detailing surveys of the glacier's snout and surface, which determine if glacial retreat is rapid or punctuated.

Measurements on the mass balance of the glacier, as well as more detailed ice thickness measurements using a portable radar echo sounder, were undertaken. Monitoring of climatic conditions continues, with emphasis on the impact of Foehn winds on glacier mass balance.

An expedition by scientists from the Australian Antarctic Division visited the volcanic island in 2009, observing glaciers that had retreated 50 metres in three years. Repairs were made to an automatic weather station established in November 2000.

Glaciologist Dr. Ian Allison cites that the latest aerial surveys show continuous rapid melt and that satellite imagery shows that McDonald Island island double in size due to volcanic activity.

== Glacier changes ==
=== Changes before 1955 ===
- No apparent change from 1874 to 1902, or from 1902 to 1929.
- Minor recession in a few places by 1947 and widespread by 1954.
- Marked changes occurred in the ice formation above 5,000 feet (1,500 m) on the southwestern slopes of Big Ben from 1949 to 1954 (possibly volcanic activity (Padang, 1963)

=== Changes since 1955 ===
- The major recession in 1963 was obvious below 2,000 feet (610 m) on almost all glaciers, and minor recession was evident as high as 5,000 feet (1,500 m).
- Winston Glacier retreated approximately 1 mile (1.6 km) between 1947 and 1963.
- Striking retreat on the coast northwest of Spit Bay.
- Disappearance of coastal ice cliffs 50 feet (15 m) high off Brown and Stephenson Glaciers by 1963. Glaciers terminated as much as 100 yards (91 m) inland.
- Marked recession since 1955 of Baudissin Glacier on the north coast, Vahsel Glacier on the west coast, and Jacka Glacier on the east coast of Laurens Peninsula.
- 1965 observations suggest a possible readvance of two glaciers:
  - Winston Glacier had increased in thickness at its terminus, and some moraine overthrust was apparent at the northeastern seaward edge of Stephenson Glacier. Overthrusts had also been seen in 1963 on the north lateral moraine of Baudissin Glacier.

== Possible causes of terminus change ==
=== Volcanic activity ===
Volcanic activity may have caused the glacier changes above 5,000 feet (1,500 m) between 1949 and 1955, but such activity seems to be minor and localized. It cannot explain the widespread glacier retreat that has occurred since 1955. Snow is a poor conductor of heat, and the meltwater quickly becomes steam, resulting in a dampened response. The thin deposits of volcanic ash reduce albedo and accelerate melt, but thicker deposits of debris and cooled lava remain on the snow or ice for many years, insulating it against solar radiation and thus reducing melt.

Some of the volcano Big Ben's activities include a major eruption which was observed in 1910, incandescent lava reported in 1950, and new fumaroles seen above 5,000 feet (1,500 m) on the south western slopes of Big Ben in 1949; these were still active in 1954 but were not seen in 1963 or 1965.

=== Southward movement of the Antarctic Convergence ===
The southward movement of the Antarctic Convergence might cause glacier retreat through a rise in sea and air temperature. However, there is no evidence of a change in the Antarctic Convergence's mean position. Because the Antarctic Convergence in the Kerguelen Islands region is not well known, its position there is the subject of considerable disagreement (Meinardus, 1923; Mackintosh, 1946; Ostapoff, 1965; Soviet Antarctic Expedition, 1966).

=== Climatic change ===
Evidence of a probable change in the wind regime at Heard Island within the past century implies climate change is a real factor for terminus retreat. Sealers' observations (1856–1859) showed fewer southwesterly and more northerly winds than did those made by ANARE (1948–1955).

== Individual glaciers ==
Glaciers	Date of change	Changes
Baudissin	1955→	Continuous marked recession
Vahsel	1955→	Continuous marked recession. Loss of at least 200 feet (61 m) vertically of ice, with horizontal retreat as indicated by terminal moraines.
Abbotsmith	1947→	Relatively little change
Gotley	1947→	Relatively little change
Winston	1947–1963	Loss of about 300 feet (91 m) in thickness as indicated by young moraines flanking the Winston Lagoon; retreated 1 mile (1.6 km)
Stephenson	1947–1963	50 feet (15 m) of coastal ice cliff disappeared and terminated 100 yards (91 m) inland
Brown	1947–1963; 2008	Similar to the Stephenson Glacier. 50 feet (15 m) of coastal ice cliff disappeared and terminated 100 yards (91 m) inland. 29% reduction in area.
Compton	1947–1986	Retreated 1,600 metres (1 mi)
Jacka	1955→	Continuous marked recession
