= List of glaciers of Heard Island and McDonald Islands =

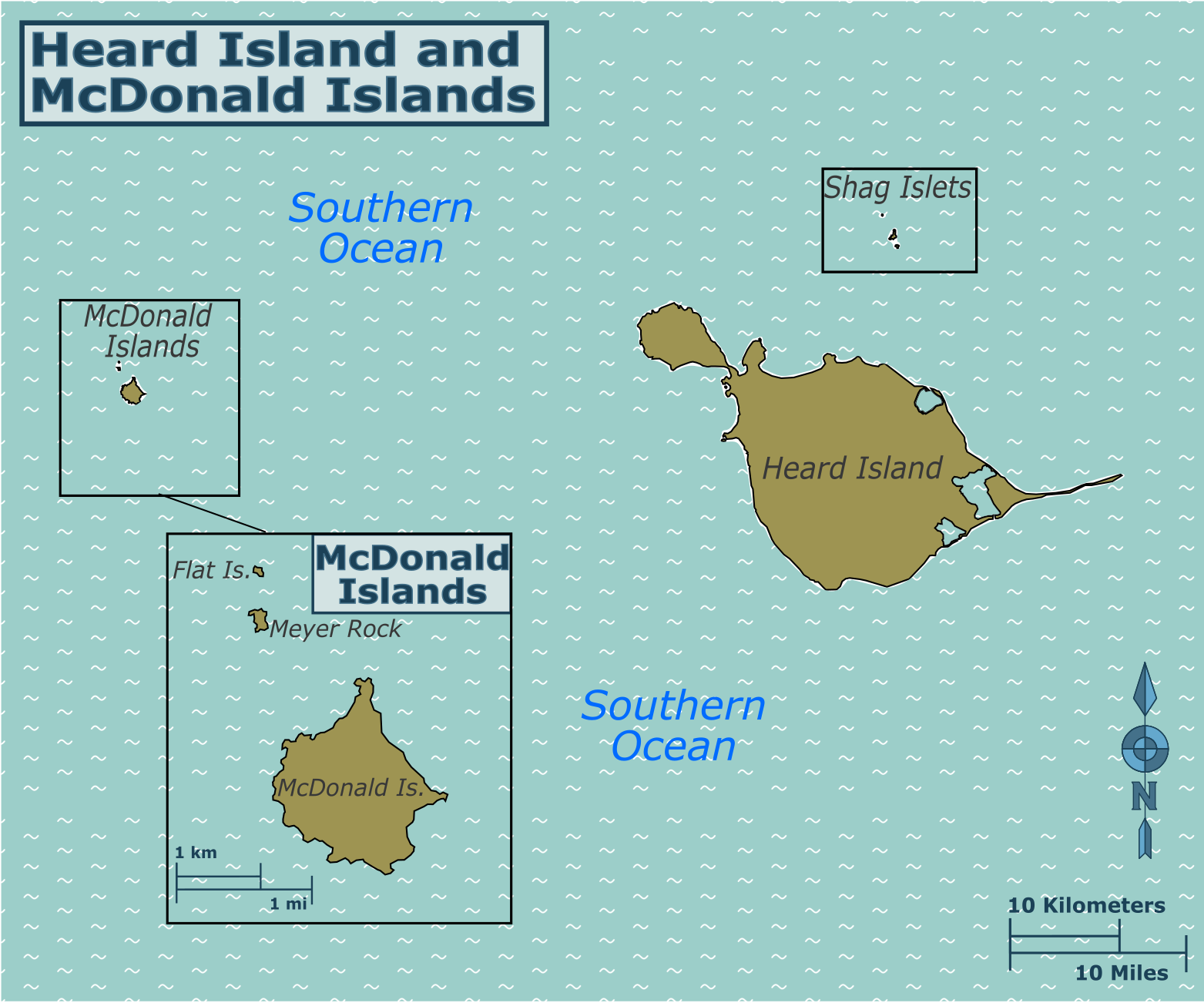
A map of Heard Island and McDonald Islands

Following is a list of glaciers of Heard Island and McDonald Islands in Antarctica. This list may not reflect recently named glaciers in Heard Island and McDonald Islands.

== Context ==
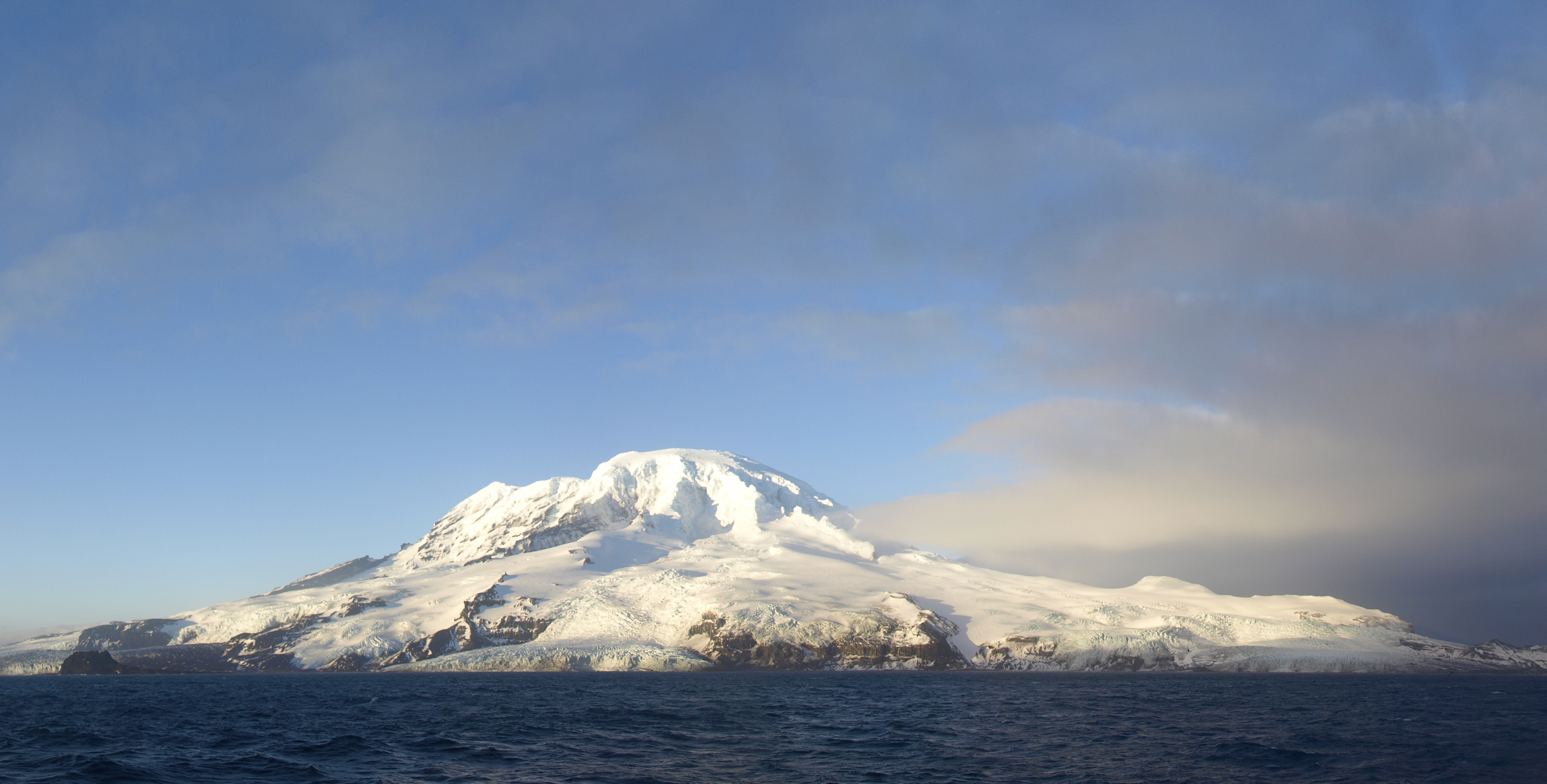
Heard Island from a boat facing southwest from approximately the Shag Islets

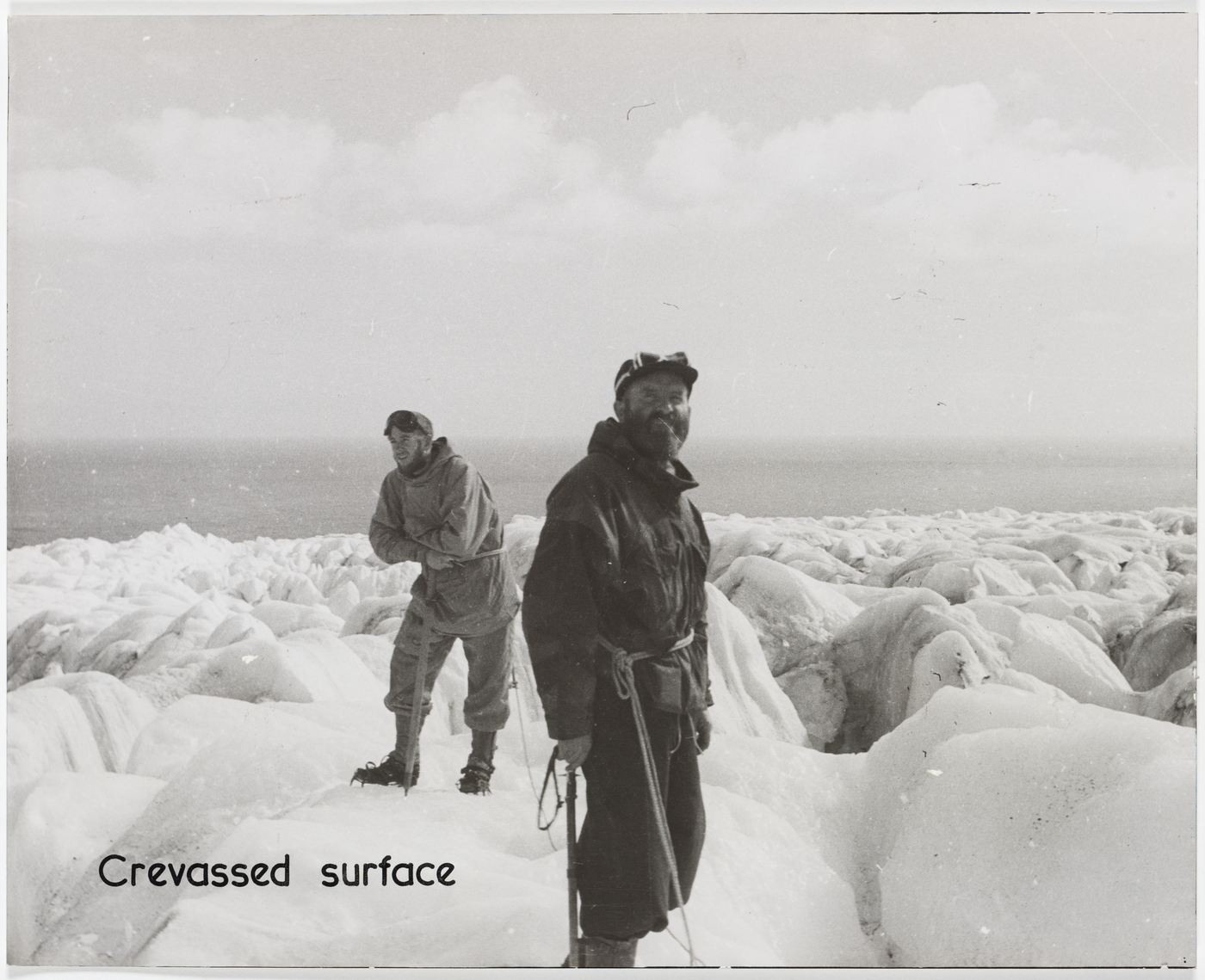
Field party, roped together, explore badly crevassed glacier - Heard Island 1950s

Heard Island is a volcanic island in the Southern Ocean that is 80% covered in ice. The island is cold and steep, and experiences high levels of snowfall. There are many glaciers, which descend for up to 7 kilometres (4.3 mi) from up to 2,400 metres (7,900 ft) down to sea level. The larger glaciers lose as much as 80% of their volume through calving into the ocean, and they are not particularly sensitive to temperature changes. Melting is a more significant factor in loss of volume for the smaller glaciers.

Spring temperatures in the 1980s were about 1.7 °C (35.1 °F) higher than the average in 1946–54. Comparison of air photographs from 1947 and early 1970 show that glaciers have generally retreated, particularly on the eastern flanks, and that they have narrowed on northern and windward western flanks. The area covered by glaciers had shrunk from 288 square kilometres (111 sq mi) in 1947 to 257 square kilometres (99 sq mi) by 1988. A visit to the island in Spring 2000 showed several glaciers had retreated further, including the Stephenson, Brown and Baudissin glaciers. Other studies have also shown the glaciers are retreating.

== List of glaciers ==
=== Abbotsmith Glacier ===
53°06′S 73°24′E. A well-defined glacier, 3 nautical miles (5.6 km; 3.5 mi) long, descending from the ice-covered west slopes of Big Ben to the west side of Heard Island between Walsh Bluff and Henderson Bluff. Surveyed in 1948 by the Australian National Antarctic Research Expeditions (ANARE) who named it for John Abbotsmith, engineer with the party.

=== Allison Glacier ===
53°04′S 73°24′E. An ice stream on Heard Island flowing from Big Ben down to the sea to the south of Cape Gazert. Named after Ian Allison, glaciologist, Australian Antarctic Division, who carried out glaciological studies in this area in 1971 during the French-Australian Expedition.

=== Baudissin Glacier ===
53°02′S 73°26′E A glacier, 1.5 nautical miles (2.8 km; 1.7 mi) wide, flowing into the west part of Corinthian Bay, 1 nautical mile (1.9 km; 1.2 mi) west of Challenger Glacier, on the north side of Heard Island. The glacier appears to have been first noted by a sketch in the narrative accompanying the scientific reports of the 1874 Challenger work along the north side of the island. The GerAE under Drygalski, 1901-03, portrayed a single large glacier flowing into Corinthian Bay and named it after Admiral Count Friedrich Baudissin, a sponsor of the expedition. In 1948 the ANARE determined that more than one glacier discharges into Corinthian Bay. The Antarctic Names Committee of Australia (ANCA) recommended in 1954 that Baudissin Glacier be adopted for the westernmost and largest of these glaciers. Not: Baudissen Glacier.

=== Brown Glacier ===
53°04′S 73°39′E. A glacier just south of Round Hill on the east side of Heard Island. Surveyed by ANARE in 1948. Named by ANCA for K.G. Brown, ANARE biologist on Heard Island in 1951. Between 1947 and 2004 the Brown Glacier shrank in area by about 29% from 6.18 square kilometres (2.39 sq mi) to 4.38 square kilometres (1.69 sq mi), with a corresponding reduction in volume. The change appears to be due to increased air temperatures during this period rather than any other factor.

=== Challenger Glacier ===
53°02′S 73°28′E. A glacier, 0.8 nautical miles (1.5 km; 0.92 mi) wide, flowing into the east part of Corinthian Bay, 1 nautical mile (1.9 km; 1.2 mi) east of Baudissin Glacier, on the north side of Heard Island. The glacier appears to have been first charted by the GerAE under Drygalski, 1901-03, who portrayed a single large glacier flowing into Corinthian Bay. In 1948 the ANARE determined that more than one glacier discharges into Corinthian Bay. The ANARE applied the name Challenger Glacier to the easternmost of these glaciers to commemorate the work of the British Challenger expedition, 1873-76.

=== Compton Glacier ===
53°03′S 73°37′E. A glacier, 3 nautical miles (5.6 km; 3.5 mi) long, flowing northeast from the lower slopes of Big Ben to the northeast side of Heard Island between Gilchrist Beach and Fairchild Beach. The lower reaches of this glacier were charted and named "Morgan's Iceberg" on an 1860 sketch map compiled by Capt. H.C. Chester, American sealer operating in the area during this period. The feature was surveyed in 1948 by the ANARE, who applied the name Compton Glacier for G.S. Compton, assistant surveyor with the expedition. Not: Morgan's Iceberg.

=== Deacock Glacier ===
53°11′S 73°31′E. A glacier close to the west of Lavett Bluff on the south side of Heard Island. Surveyed by ANARE, 1948-63. Named by ANCA for W. Deacock, a member of ANARE on Heard Island in 1963.

=== Downes Glacier ===
53°02′S 73°31′E. A broad glacier flowing north on both sides of Cape Bidlingmaier to the north coast of Heard Island. Surveyed by ANARE in 1948. Named by ANCA for M.C. Downes, ANARE biologist at Heard Island in 1951 and 1963.

=== Ealey Glacier ===
A glacier flowing from Big Ben on Heard Island to the sea between Melbourne Bluff and North Barrier. The glacier terminates in ice cliffs. Named For E.H.M. Ealey, Biologist, 1949 ANARE Heard Island Expedition who crossed the glacier during a biological survey en route to Spit Point.

=== Fiftyone Glacier ===
53°11′S 73°34′E. A large glacier flowing south between Lavett Bluff and Lambeth Bluff on the south side of Heard Island. Surveyed by ANARE in 1948. Named "The 1951 Glacier" by an ANARE party that made a traverse of Heard Island in 1951. The form Fiftyone Glacier was recommended by ANCA in 1964.

=== Gotley Glacier ===
53°10′S 73°27′E. A well-defined glacier, 5 nautical miles (9.3 km; 5.8 mi) long, descending from the ice-covered slopes of Big Ben to the southwest side of Heard Island between Cape Arkona and Cape Labuan. Surveyed in 1948 by the ANARE, and named by them for Aubrey V. Gotley, meteorologist and officer-in-charge of the party.

=== Jacka Glacier ===
53°00′S 73°20′E. A glacier, 0.8 nautical miles (1.5 km; 0.92 mi) long, flowing northeast from Hayter Peak and terminating in icefalls opposite Vanhoffen Bluff on the north side of Heard Island. The glacier appears to be roughly charted on an 1860 sketch map compiled by Capt. H.C. Chester, American sealer operating in the area during this period. It was surveyed in 1948 by the ANARE, and named by them for Fred J. Jacka, expedition physicist.

=== Lied Glacier ===
53°09′S 73°26′E. A glacier close north of Cape Arkona on the southwest side of Heard Island. Surveyed by ANARE in 1948. Named by ANCA for N.T. Lied, radio operator and weather observer with ANARE on Heard Island in the years 1951 and 1963, respectively.

=== Schmidt Glacier ===
53°03′S 73°24′E. A glacier, 0.7 nautical miles (1.3 km; 0.81 mi) long, flowing west from Baudissin Glacier between Mount Drygalski and North West Cornice, on the west side of Heard Island. The feature was roughly charted in 1902 by the German Antarctic Expedition (GerAE) under Erich von Drygalski. He named it for Dr. J. Schmidt of the Royal Prussian Ministry, who assisted in obtaining government support for the expedition.

=== Stephenson Glacier ===
53°06′S 73°42′E. A glacier close west of Dovers Moraine on the east side of Heard Island. Surveyed by ANARE in 1948. Named by ANCA for P.J. Stephenson, ANARE geologist on Heard Island in 1963.

=== Vahsel Glacier ===
53°04′S 73°23′E A glacier draining west into South West Bay on the west side of Heard Island. The feature was charted in 1902 by the GerAE under Drygalski. He named it for Richard Vahsel, an officer on the Gauss and a member of the party that made geological investigations near Atlas Cove.

=== Winston Glacier ===
53°09′S 73°38′E. A glacier flowing to Winston Lagoon on the southeast side of Heard Island. Surveyed by ANARE in 1948. Named by ANCA in 1964 in association with nearby Winston Lagoon.

== Sources ==
- Alberts, Fred G., ed. (1995), Geographic Names of the Antarctic (PDF) (2 ed.), United States Board on Geographic Names This article incorporates public domain material from websites or documents of the United States Board on Geographic Names.
- "Allison Glacier", Gazetteer, AADC: Australian Antarctic Data Centre
- Allison, Ian F.; Keage, Peter L. (1986), "Recent changes in the glaciers of Heard Island", Polar Record, 23 (144): 255–272, doi:10.1017/S0032247400007099, S2CID 130086301
- Budd, G.M. (2000), "Changes in Heard Island glaciers, king penguins and fur seals since 1947 (Heard Island Papers)", Pap. Proc. R. Soc. Tasm., 133 (2): 47–60
- "Ealey Glacier", Gazetteer, AADC: Australian Antarctic Data Centre
- Quilty, P.G.; Wheller, G. (2000), "Heard Island and the McDonald Islands: A window into the Kerguelen Plateau (Heard Island Papers)", Pap. Proc. R. Soc. Tasm., 133 (2): 1–12
- Ruddell, Andrew (25 May 2010), Our subantarctic glaciers: why are they retreating?, Glaciology Program, Antarctic CRC and AAD, archived from the original on 2 October 2009
- Thost, Douglas E.; Truffer, Martin (February 2008), "Glacier Recession on Heard Island, Southern Indian Ocean", Arctic, Antarctic, and Alpine Research, 40 (1): 199–214, doi:10.1657/1523-0430(06-084)[THOST]2.0.CO;2, S2CID 130245283
