= Verner Island =

Island in Antarctica

- Location within Antarctica

Geography
- Location: Antarctica
- Coordinates: 67°35′S 62°53′E

Administration
- Administered under the Antarctic Treaty System

Demographics
- Population: Uninhabited

Verner Island is one of the Jocelyn Islands, lying just west of Petersen Island, just east of Lee Island and Kista Strait, and just south of Moller Bank and Carstens Shoal, in Holme Bay, Mac. Robertson Land. It was mapped by Norwegian cartographers from air photos taken by the Lars Christensen Expedition, 1936–37, and remapped by ANARE (Australian National Antarctic Research Expeditions) in 1956. It was named Verner Pedersen, the chief officer of the Thala Dan in 1961.

== See also ==
- List of Antarctic and sub-Antarctic islands
