= Petersen Island =

Island in Antarctica

- Location within Antarctica

Geography
- Location: Antarctica
- Coordinates: 67°35′S 62°54′E

Administration
- Administered under the Antarctic Treaty System

Demographics
- Population: Uninhabited

Petersen Island is a largest and most northerly island of the Jocelyn Islands in Holme Bay, Mac. Robertson Land, and is situated just east of Verner Island, Lee Island, and Kista Strait, and just south of Moller Bank and Carstens Shoal. Mapped by Norwegian cartographers from air photos taken by the Lars Christensen Expedition, 1936–37. Named by Antarctic Names Committee of Australia (ANCA) for Captain H.C. Petersen, master of the Thala Dan, 1959–61, and formerly master of the Kista Dan.

== See also ==
- List of Antarctic and sub-Antarctic islands
