= Winston Glacier =

Glacier on Heard Island in the southern Indian Ocean

- Location of Heard Island and McDonald Islands on the globe

- Location within Indian Ocean
- Interactive map of Winston Glacier
- Type: cirque/tidewater
- Location: Heard Island; Territory of Heard Island and McDonald Islands; Australia
- Coordinates: 53°9′S 73°38′E
- Thickness: approximately 55 meters
- Terminus: Winston Lagoon, between Cape Lockyer and Oatt Rocks
- Status: Retreating

Winston Glacier (53°9′S 73°38′E) is a glacier flowing to Winston Lagoon on the southeast side of Heard Island in the southern Indian Ocean. Its terminus is at Winston Lagoon, between Cape Lockyer and Oatt Rocks. To the northeast of Winston Glacier is Stephenson Glacier, the terminus of which is located between Dovers Moraine and Stephenson Lagoon. To the southwest of Winston Glacier is Fiftyone Glacier, whose terminus is located between Lavett Bluff and Lambeth Bluff.

== Discovery and naming ==
Winston Glacier was surveyed by through the Australian National Antarctic Research Expeditions in 1948. It was named by Antarctic Names Committee of Australia in 1964 in association with nearby Winston Lagoon.

== See also ==
- List of glaciers in the Antarctic
- Retreat of glaciers since 1850
