= Van Hulssen Islands =

Island group in Antarctica

- Location within Antarctica

Geography
- Location: Antarctica
- Coordinates: 67°33′S 62°43′E

Administration
- Administered under the Antarctic Treaty System

Demographics
- Population: Uninhabited

Van Hulssen Islands is a group of about ten small islands, of which Van Hulssen Island is the largest, lying 2.8 km (1.5 nmi) north of Pila Island in Holme Bay. The islands were mapped by Norwegian cartographers from air photos taken by the Lars Christensen Expedition, 1936–37, and included as part of a group called "Ytterskjera." They were remapped by ANARE (Australian National Antarctic Research Expeditions), 1954–62, and named after the largest island in the group.

== See also ==
- List of Antarctic and subantarctic islands
