= Vanhoffen =

Vanhoffen (or Vanhöffen) may refer to:

- Ernst Vanhöffen (1858–1918), German zoologist
- Vanhoffen Bluff, a feature of Heard Island in the Antarctic, named for Ernst Vanhöffen
