= Evans Island (disambiguation) =

Evans Island is an island in southern Alaska in the United States. It can also refer to:

- Evans Island, an island in Antarctica
- Evans Island, an island in Sabah, Malaysia
- Evan's Island, an alternate name for Tokomāpuna Island / Aeroplane Island, an island in New Zealand
