= Wigg Islands =

Archipelago north of Mac. Robertson Land, Antarctica

- Location within Antarctica

Geography
- Location: Antarctica
- Coordinates: 67°32′S 62°34′E
- Total islands: 6

Administration
- Administered under the Antarctic Treaty System

Demographics
- Population: Uninhabited

Wigg Islands is a group of six small islands, 11 kilometres (6 nmi) northwest of the Flat Islands in Holme Bay, Mac. Robertson Land, Antarctica. They were mapped by Norwegian cartographers from air photos taken by the Lars Christensen Expedition, 1936–37, and named Mesteinene (the middle stones). In 1962 they were renamed by the Antarctic Names Committee of Australia (ANCA) for Dr. D.R. Wigg, medical officer at Mawson Station.

== See also ==
- List of Antarctic and subantarctic islands
