= Wollesen Islands =

Group of small islands near Antarctica

- Location within Antarctica

Geography
- Location: Antarctica
- Coordinates: 67°31′S 62°41′E

Administration
- Administered under the Antarctic Treaty System

Demographics
- Population: Uninhabited

Wollesen Islands are a group of small islands at the entrance of Holme Bay, about 1.9 km (1 nmi) west of Azimuth Islands. First mapped from air photographs by the Lars Christensen Expedition, 1936–37. Remapped from air photos by ANARE (Australian National Antarctic Research Expeditions). Named by Antarctic Names Committee of Australia (ANCA) for C. Wollesen Petersen, radio officer on the Thala Dan and Nella Dan on nine ANARE relief voyages.

== See also ==
- List of Antarctic and sub-Antarctic islands
