= Canopus Rocks =

Two rocks in Antarctica

- Location within Antarctica

Geography
- Location: Antarctica
- Coordinates: 67°31′S 62°56′E

Administration
- Administered under the Antarctic Treaty System

Demographics
- Population: Uninhabited

The Canopus Rocks are two small, low rocks lying 2 kilometres (1 nmi) northwest of Canopus Island, 2 kilometres (1 nmi) east of Nella Rock and the Sawert Rocks, and 1.9 kilometres (1 nmi) southeast of Hansen Rocks in the eastern part of Holme Bay, Mac. Robertson Land. They were plotted from photos taken from Australian National Antarctic Research Expeditions aircraft in 1958, and named by the Antarctic Names Committee of Australia after Canopus Island.
