= Peake-Jones Rock =

- Location within Antarctica

Geography
- Location: Antarctica
- Coordinates: 67°38′S 62°48′E

Administration
- Administered under the Antarctic Treaty System

Demographics
- Population: Uninhabited

Peake-Jones Rock is a low, bean-shaped rock lying just off the coast and 3.7 kilometres (2 nmi) northeast of Ring Rock in Holme Bay, Mac. Robertson Land. The rock was mapped by Norwegian cartographers from air photos taken by the Lars Christensen Expedition, 1936–37. It was named by Antarctic Names Committee of Australia (ANCA) for K. Peake-Jones, weather observer at Mawson Station in 1959.
