= Smith Rocks =

Smith Rocks (67°31′S 63°1′E) is a group of rocks lying 1 kilometre (0.5 nmi) northeast of Canopus Islands, 1 kilometre (0.5 nmi) west of Kitney Island, 3.7 kilometres (2 nmi) southwest of Wiltshire Rocks, and 5.6 kilometres (3 nmi) northwest of Paterson Islands, in the east part of Holme Bay, Mac. Robertson Land. Mapped by Norwegian cartographers from air photos taken by the Lars Christensen Expedition, 1936–37, and named Spjotoyholmane. Renamed by Antarctic Names Committee of Australia (ANCA) for Captain V. Smith, RAASC, DUKW driver who took part in ANARE (Australian National Antarctic Research Expeditions) changeover operations at Davis and Mawson stations in 1958-59 and 1959–60.
