= Parallactic Island =

Island in Antarctica

- Location within Antarctica

Geography
- Location: Antarctica
- Coordinates: 67°32′S 62°46′E

Administration
- Administered under the Antarctic Treaty System

Demographics
- Population: Uninhabited

Parallactic Island is the most northwesterly of the Parallactic Islands in Holme Bay, Mac. Robertson Land. Mapped by Norwegian cartographers from air photos taken by the Lars Christensen Expedition, 1936–37. So named by Antarctic Names Committee of Australia (ANCA) because a photo-theodolite was erected on the island for parallactic measurement of the aurora by ANARE (Australian National Antarctic Research Expeditions) in 1961.

== See also ==
- List of Antarctic and sub-Antarctic islands
