= Van Hulssen Island =

Island in Antarctica

- Location within Antarctica

Geography
- Location: Antarctica
- Coordinates: 67°33′S 62°43′E

Administration
- Administered under the Antarctic Treaty System

Demographics
- Population: Uninhabited

Van Hulssen Island is a small island lying 5.6 km (3 nmi) northwest of Flat Islands in Holme Bay, Antarctica. It was mapped by Norwegian cartographers from air photos taken by the Lars Christensen Expedition, 1936–37, and perhaps included in the scattered islands which they called Ytterskjera. Van Hulssen Island was included in a triangulation carried out by ANARE (Australian National Antarctic Research Expeditions) in 1954, and in 1955 a party established an automatic meteorological station there. It was named by the Antarctic Names Committee of Australia (ANCA) for F.A. Van Hulssen, the radio station supervisor at Mawson Station in 1955.

== See also ==
- List of Antarctic and sub-Antarctic islands
