= Paterson Islands =

Island group in Antarctica

- Location within Antarctica

Geography
- Location: Antarctica
- Coordinates: 67°32′S 63°10′E

Administration
- Administered under the Antarctic Treaty System

Demographics
- Population: Uninhabited

Paterson Islands is a group of small islands lying 7.4 kilometres (4 nmi) northeast of Klung Islands, 3.7 kilometres (2 nmi) southeast of Wiltshire Rocks and Kitney Island, and 5.6 kilometres (3 nmi) southeast of Smith Rocks, close along the coast of Mac. Robertson Land. Mapped by Norwegian cartographers from air photos taken by the Lars Christensen Expedition, 1936–37. Named by Antarctic Names Committee of Australia (ANCA) for A.J.F. Paterson, supervisory technician (radio) at Mawson Station, 1963.

== See also ==
- List of Antarctic and sub-Antarctic islands
