= Fiftyone Glacier =

Glacier on Heard Island in the southern Indian Ocean

- Location of Heard Island and McDonald Islands on the globe

- Location within Indian Ocean
- Interactive map of Fiftyone Glacier
- Type: cirque/tidewater
- Location: Heard Island; Territory of Heard Island and McDonald Islands; Australia
- Coordinates: 53°11′S 73°34′E
- Thickness: approximately 55 meters
- Terminus: between Lavett Bluff and Lambeth Bluff
- Status: Retreating

Fiftyone Glacier is a large glacier flowing southwards, on the south side of Heard Island in the southern Indian Ocean. Its terminus is located between Lavett Bluff and Lambeth Bluff. To the northeast of Fiftyone Glacier is Winston Glacier, whose terminus is located at Winston Lagoon, between Cape Lockyer and Oatt Rocks. To the west of Fiftyone Glacier is Deacock Glacier, whose terminus is located between Cape Labuan and Long Beach.

== Discovery and naming ==
Fiftyone Glacier was surveyed by ANARE (Australian National Antarctic Research Expeditions) in 1948. It was named "The 1951 Glacier" by an ANARE party that made a traverse of Heard Island in 1951. The form Fiftyone Glacier was recommended by Antarctic Names Committee of Australia (ANCA) in 1964.
