= South Barrier =

Rocky ridge in southern Heard Island

South Barrier (53°9′S 73°35′E) is a rocky ridge descending southward from Budd Peak along the east margin of Fiftyone Glacier and terminating at Lambeth Bluff in southern Heard Island. The descriptive name was applied by ANARE (Australian National Antarctic Research Expeditions) in 1948.
