= Hansen Rocks =

Island group in Antarctica

- Location within Antarctica

Geography
- Location: Antarctica
- Coordinates: 67°30′S 62°54′E

Administration
- Administered under the Antarctic Treaty System

Demographics
- Population: Uninhabited

The Hansen Rocks are a group of five small islands lying just north of Holme Bay and the coast of Mac. Robertson Land, Antarctica, about 2 kilometres (1 nmi) northeast of the Sawert Rocks and Nella Rock, and about 2 kilometres (1 nmi) northwest of the Canopus Rocks. They were plotted from Australian National Antarctic Research Expeditions (ANARE) air photographs, and were named by the Antarctic Names Committee of Australia for Captain B.T. Hansen, master of the Nella Dan for ANARE relief voyages in 1968, 1969, 1970 and 1972.
