= Kellas =

Kellas can refer to:

- Kellas, Angus, Scotland.
- Kellas, Moray, Scotland
- Kellas Islands, Antarctica

== See also ==
- Alexander Kellas (1868–1921), Scottish physiologist and mountaineer
