= West Budd Island =

Island in Antarctica

- Location within Antarctica

Geography
- Location: Antarctica
- Coordinates: 67°35′S 62°50′E
- Archipelago: Flat Islands

Administration
- Administered under the Antarctic Treaty System

Demographics
- Population: Uninhabited

West Budd Island is the western of two larger islands at the north end of the Flat Islands, Holme Bay. Mapped by Norwegian cartographers from air photos taken by the Lars Christensen Expedition, 1936–37. They named the northern islands Flatøynalane (the flat island needles). This western island was named by ANCA for Dr. G.M. Budd, medical officer at nearby Mawson Station in 1959.

== See also ==
- Composite Antarctic Gazetteer
- List of Antarctic islands south of 60° S
- SCAR
- Territorial claims in Antarctica
