= Turret Island =

Island in Antarctica

Turret Island (71°22′S 169°13′E) is a small island, ice-covered except for the north face. It lies partly within the seaward terminus of Shipley Glacier, 1 nautical mile (1.9 km) west of Flat Island, along the north coast of Victoria Land. The rocky north end projecting from the glacier is suggestive of a turret. It was charted and named by the Northern Party, led by Campbell, of the British Antarctic Expedition, 1910–13.

== See also ==
- List of antarctic and sub-antarctic islands
