= Pila Island =

Island in Antarctica

- Location within Antarctica

Geography
- Location: Antarctica
- Coordinates: 67°35′S 62°43′E

Administration
- Administered under the Antarctic Treaty System

Demographics
- Population: Uninhabited

Pila Island is a small island 2.8 km (1.5 nmi) west of the Flat Islands in Holme Bay, Mac. Robertson Land. Mapped by Norwegian cartographers from air photos taken by the Lars Christensen Expedition, 1936–37, and named Pila (the arrow).

== See also ==
- List of Antarctic and sub-Antarctic islands
