= Teyssier Island =

Island in Mac. Robertson Land, Antarctica

Teyssier Island (67°36′S 62°54′E) is an island at the south end of the Jocelyn Islands in Holme Bay, Mac. Robertson Land. Mapped by Norwegian cartographers from air photos taken by the Lars Christensen Expedition, 1936–37. Named by Antarctic Names Committee of Australia (ANCA) for P. Teyssier, cook at nearby Mawson Station in 1959.

== See also ==
- List of Antarctic and sub-Antarctic islands
