= Ring Rock =

Rock in Antarctica

Ring Rock (67°39′S 62°43′E) is a rock lying 3.7 kilometres (2 nmi) southeast of Nost Island at the head of Holme Bay. Mapped by Norwegian cartographers from aerial photographs taken by the Lars Christensen Expedition, 1936–37, and named Ringoya (ring island). First visited in 1956 by an ANARE (Australian National Antarctic Research Expeditions) sledging party; they found that the term "rock" better describes this feature.
