= Klung Islands =

Island of Antarctica

- Location within Antarctica

Geography
- Location: Antarctica
- Coordinates: 67°33′S 63°0′E

Administration
- Administered under the Antarctic Treaty System

Demographics
- Population: Uninhabited

The Klung Islands are a group of small islands lying 1 kilometre (0.5 nmi) east of Welch Island and the Welch Rocks in the northeastern part of Holme Bay, Antarctica. They were mapped by Norwegian cartographers from aerial photographs taken by the Lars Christensen Expedition, 1936–37, and called Klungholmane (the Bramble Islands). Klung Island is the largest island in the group.

== See also ==
- List of Antarctic and sub-Antarctic islands
