= Sawert Rocks =

Geological formation in Antarctica

- Location within Antarctica

Geography
- Location: Antarctica
- Coordinates: 67°31′S 62°50′E

Administration
- Administered under the Antarctic Treaty System

Demographics
- Population: Uninhabited

Sawert Rocks is a group of rocks 4.6 kilometres (2.5 nmi) east-northeast of Azimuth Island, and about 3.7 kilometres (2 nmi) southwest of the Hansen Rocks, in the northeast part of Holme Bay, Mac. Robertson Land. Plotted from photos taken from ANARE (Australian National Antarctic Research Expeditions) aircraft in 1958. Named by Antarctic Names Committee of Australia (ANCA) for A. Sawert, radio officer at Mawson Station in 1959. Just to the east of the Sawert Rocks lies Nella Rock.
