= Canopus Islands =

Group of islands in Antarctica

- Location within Antarctica

Geography
- Location: Antarctica
- Coordinates: 67°32′S 62°59′E

Administration
- Administered under the Antarctic Treaty System

Demographics
- Population: Uninhabited

Canopus Islands is a group of small islands just north of the Klung Islands in the eastern part of Holme Bay, Mac. Robertson Land. They were mapped by Norwegian cartographers from air photos taken by the Lars Christensen Expedition, 1936–37, and named by the Australian National Antarctic Research Expeditions after the star Canopus.

== See also ==
- Canopus Island
- List of Antarctic and sub-Antarctic islands
