= Brown Glacier =

Glacier on Heard Island in the southern Indian Ocean

- Location of Heard Island and McDonald Islands on the globe

- Location within Indian Ocean
- Interactive map of Brown Glacier
- Location: Heard Island; Territory of Heard Island and McDonald Islands; Australia
- Coordinates: 53°04′S 73°39′E
- Thickness: approximately 55 meters
- Terminus: Brown Lagoon
- Status: Retreating

Brown Glacier (53°04′S 73°39′E) is a glacier just south of Round Hill on the east side of Heard Island in the southern Indian Ocean. Its terminus is at Brown Lagoon. To the northwest of Brown Glacier is Compton Glacier, whose terminus is located at Compton Lagoon, between Gilchrist Beach and Fairchild Beach. To the southeast of Brown Glacier is Stephenson Glacier, whose terminus is located between Dovers Moraine and Stephenson Lagoon.

== Discovery and naming ==
Brown Glacier was surveyed by ANARE (Australian National Antarctic Research Expeditions) in 1948. Named by Antarctic Names Committee of Australia (ANCA) for K.G. Brown, ANARE biologist on Heard Island in 1951.
