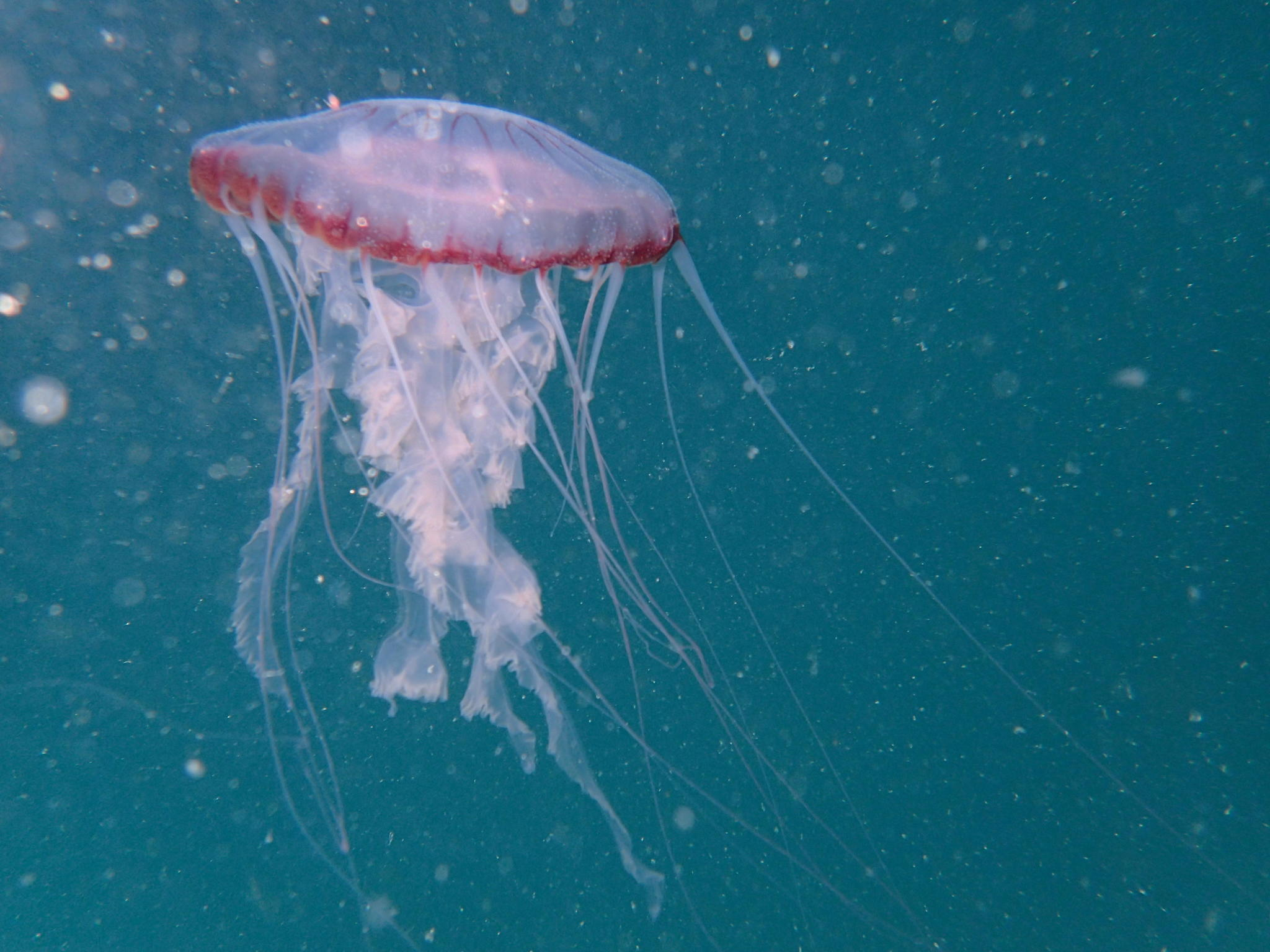

Scientific classification
- Kingdom: Animalia
- Phylum: Cnidaria
- Class: Scyphozoa
- Order: Semaeostomeae
- Family: Pelagiidae
- Genus: Chrysaora
- Species: C. fulgida

Binomial name
- Chrysaora fulgida (Reynaud, 1830)

Synonyms
- Medusa fulgida Reynaud, 1830

= Chrysaora fulgida =

Species of jellyfish

Chrysaora fulgida, the Benguela compass jelly, is a species of jellyfish in the family Pelagiidae. Found in the southeastern Atlantic Ocean along the western coast of South Africa (an area affected by the Benguela Current), its taxonomy has historically caused considerable confusion. Like other sea nettles, its sting is painful, but not generally dangerous unless there is an allergic reaction to the venom.

== Taxonomy ==
C. fulgida was first described in 1830 by A.A.M. Reynaud. In 1902, C. africana was described by E. Vanhöffen. In 1939 it was suggested that C. africana simply represented old individuals of C. fulgida, a view repeated as recently as 2010. C. fulgida itself has frequently been confused with the closely related and quite similar C. hysoscella. Recent studies have been able to separate not only C. hysoscella (now known to be restricted to the northeast Atlantic Ocean), but also the three southeast Atlantic Chrysaora species—C. africana, C. fulgida and C. agulhensis—based on differences in their morphology and genetics. The last and still-undescribed species, also known by the common name Cape compass jelly, is widespread along the southern African coast from Namibia to Durban in South Africa. Although a detailed description has been published where a scientific name was proposed, it did not comply with article 8 of the ICZN Code.
