= Rocky Beach =

Rocky Beach may refer to:

- A beach where the ground is made up of large stones rather than sand, also known as a cobble beach
- An old name for Gilchrist Beach
- A fictitious town in the book series The Three Investigators
- A fictitious town in a detective book called Tin Goyenda
