= Nøst =

Nøst may refer to:

- Arne Nøst (born 1962), Norwegian graphic artist and theatre director
- Nøst Island, Antarctica

== See also ==
- Nost (disambiguation)
