= Canopus Island =

Island in Antarctica

- Location within Antarctica

Geography
- Location: Antarctica
- Coordinates: 67°32′S 62°59′E

Administration
- Administered under the Antarctic Treaty System

Demographics
- Population: Uninhabited

Canopus Island is the southern of the two largest islands of the Canopus Islands in Holme Bay, Mac. Robertson Land, with the Canopus Rocks lying about 1 nautical mile northwest of the islands. The two islands were mapped as one by Norwegian cartographers from air photos taken by the Lars Christensen Expedition, 1936–37, and named Spjotöy. The island was included in a triangulation survey by Australian National Antarctic Research Expeditions in 1959, and named after the star Canopus.

== See also ==
- List of Antarctic and sub-Antarctic islands
