= Chrysaora africana =

Scientific classification
- Kingdom: Animalia
- Phylum: Cnidaria
- Class: Scyphozoa
- Order: Semaeostomeae
- Family: Pelagiidae
- Genus: Chrysaora
- Species: C. africana

Binomial name
- Chrysaora africana (Vanhöffen, 1902)

Synonyms
- Dactylometra africana Vanhöffen, 1902

Species of jellyfish

Chrysaora africana, the purple compass jelly or Southern African Sea Nettle, is a species of jellyfish from the family Pelagiidae. Found in the southeastern Atlantic Ocean from Gabon to the western coast of South Africa (although uncommon in the far south of its range), its taxonomy has historically caused considerable confusion. Like other sea nettles, its sting is painful, but not generally dangerous unless there is an allergic reaction to the venom.

== Taxonomy ==
C. africana was first described by Ernst Vanhöffen in 1902. In 1939, it was suggested that it simply represented old individuals of C. fulgida, a view repeated as recently as 2010. C. fulgida itself has frequently been confused with the closely related C. hysoscella. Recent studies have been able to separate not only C. hysoscella (now known to be restricted to the northeast Atlantic Ocean) but also the three southeast Atlantic Chrysaora species—C. africana, C. fulgida and C. agulhensis—based on differences in their morphology and genetics. The last and still-undescribed species, also known by the common name Cape compass jelly, is widespread along the southern African coast from Namibia to Durban in South Africa. Although a detailed description has been published where a scientific name was proposed, it did not comply with article 8 of the ICZN Code.
