= Nella Rock =

Nella Rock (67°31′S 62°51′E) is a reef sounding 4.57 m, situated 550 m from and bearing 81 from the eastern extremity of the largest of the Sawert Rocks, at the entrance to Holme Bay. Named by Antarctic Names Committee of Australia (ANCA). The rock was struck by the Nella Dan on 4 March 1969, on passage from Mawson Station to Melbourne. It is situated about 2 nautical miles west of the Canopus Rocks and 2 nautical miles southwest of the Hansen Rocks.
