= Nelson Rock =

Rock off the coast of Mac. Robertson Land, Antarctica

- Location within Antarctica

Geography
- Location: Antarctica
- Coordinates: 67°23′S 62°45′E

Administration
- Administered under the Antarctic Treaty System

Demographics
- Population: Uninhabited

Nelson Rock is an uninhabited solitary island, being essentially a dark rock which is partly ice-covered and lies 5.6 km (3 nmi) north of Williams Rocks, off the coast of Mac Robertson Land in Holme Bay. The Rock was mapped by Robert G. Dovers of the Australian National Antarctic Research Expeditions (ANARE) in 1954. Nelson Rock was named by the Antarctic Names Committee of Australia (ANCA) for Robert Edward Kelvin Nelson, a weather observer at Mawson Station in 1962, who assisted with the triangulation of Nelson Rock and the erection of a beacon.

== See also ==
- Composite Antarctic Gazetteer
- List of Antarctic and sub-Antarctic islands
- List of Antarctic islands south of 60° S
- SCAR
- Territorial claims in Antarctica
