= Stephenson Glacier =

Glacier on Heard Island in the southern Indian Ocean

- Location of Heard Island and McDonald Islands on the globe

- Location within Indian Ocean
- Interactive map of Stephenson Glacier
- Type: cirque/tidewater
- Location: Heard Island; Territory of Heard Island and McDonald Islands; Australia
- Coordinates: 53°6′S 73°42′E
- Thickness: approximately 55 m
- Terminus: between Dovers Moraine and Stephenson Lagoon
- Status: Retreating

Stephenson Glacier (53°6′S 73°42′E) is a glacier close west of Dovers Moraine on the east side of Heard Island in the southern Indian Ocean. Its terminus is between Dovers Moraine and Stephenson Lagoon, with part of the glacier flowing to Doppler Hill and Sealers Beach. To the north of Stephenson Glacier is Brown Glacier, whose terminus is located at Brown Lagoon. To the southwest of Stephenson Glacier is Winston Glacier, whose terminus is located at Winston Lagoon, between Cape Lockyer and Oatt Rocks.

== Discovery and naming ==
Stephenson Glacier was surveyed by ANARE (Australian National Antarctic Research Expeditions) in 1948. It was named by Antarctic Names Committee of Australia (ANCA) for P.J. Stephenson, ANARE geologist on Heard Island in 1963.
