= Klung Island =

Island of Antarctica

- Location within Antarctica

Geography
- Location: Antarctica
- Coordinates: 67°33′S 62°59′E
- Archipelago: Klung Islands
- Length: 0.8 km (0.5 mi)
- Width: 0.7 km (0.43 mi)
- Highest elevation: 43 m (141 ft)

Administration
- Administered under the Antarctic Treaty System

Demographics
- Population: Uninhabited

Klung Island is the largest island of the Klung Islands lying in Holme Bay, Mac. Robertson Land, Antarctica. It was mapped by Norwegian cartographers from aerial photos taken by the Lars Christensen Expedition, 1936–37, as part of Klungholmane ('bramble islands'), and was named by the Antarctic Names Committee of Australia after the Klung Islands.

== Important Bird Area ==
A 415 ha site comprising Klung Island, neighbouring Welch Island, and the intervening smaller islands and marine area, has been designated an Important Bird Area (IBA) by BirdLife International because it supports about 36,000 breeding pairs of Adélie penguins, based on 2012 satellite imagery. Snow petrels breed on high ground on the islands.

== See also ==
- List of Antarctic and Subantarctic islands
