= Diaphus vanhoeffeni =

Conservation status
- Least Concern (IUCN 3.1)

Scientific classification
- Kingdom: Animalia
- Phylum: Chordata
- Class: Actinopterygii
- Order: Myctophiformes
- Family: Myctophidae
- Genus: Diaphus
- Species: D. vanhoeffeni

Binomial name
- Diaphus vanhoeffeni (A. B. Brauer, 1906)

Synonyms
- Myctophum vanhoeffeni A. B. Brauer, 1906; Diaphus lewisi Nafpaktitis, 1966

Species of fish

Diaphus vanhoeffeni, also known as VanHoffen's lanternfish, is a species of lanternfish found in the eastern Atlantic Ocean.

== Description ==
This species reaches a length of 4.2 cm (1.7 in).

== Etymology ==
The fish is named in honor of German zoologist Ernst Vanhöffen (1858–1918), who was noted for his studies of medusa jellies aboard the research vessel Valdivia, the first German expedition to explore the deep sea, during which the type specimen was collected.
