= Stinear Island =

Island in Antarctica

- Location within Antarctica

Geography
- Location: Antarctica
- Coordinates: 67°35′S 62°50′E

Administration
- Administered under the Antarctic Treaty System

Demographics
- Population: Uninhabited

Stinear Island is one of the Flat Islands, lying 0.37 kilometres (0.2 nmi) north of Béchervaise Island in Holme Bay, Mac. Robertson Land. It is one of several islands plotted as a part of "Flatoy" (flat island) by Norwegian cartographers from air photos taken by the Lars Christensen Expedition, 1936–37. Found to be a separate island by ANARE (Australian National Antarctic Research Expeditions) in 1954 and named for B.H. Stinear, geologist at Mawson Station in 1954, 1957 and 1959.

== See also ==
- List of Antarctic and sub-Antarctic islands
