= Evans Island (Antarctica) =

Island in Antarctica

- Location within Antarctica

Geography
- Location: Antarctica
- Coordinates: 67°36′S 62°48′E

Administration
- Administered under the Antarctic Treaty System

Demographics
- Population: Uninhabited

Evans Island is the southernmost island of the Flat Islands, lying in the eastern part of Holme Bay, Mac. Robertson Land. Mapped by Norwegian cartographers from aerial photographs taken by the Lars Christensen Expedition, 1936–37. It was photographed from the air by the U.S. Navy (USN) OpHjp, 1946–47, and by Australian National Antarctic Research Expeditions (ANARE). It was visited by various Australian National Antarctic Research Expeditions (ANARE) parties between 1954 and 1959. It was named by ANCA for D. Evans, diesel mechanic at Mawson Station, 1958.

== See also ==
- List of Antarctic and sub-Antarctic islands
