= Kitney Island =

Island in Antarctica

- Location within Antarctica

Geography
- Location: Antarctica
- Coordinates: 67°31′S 63°4′E

Administration
- Administered under the Antarctic Treaty System

Demographics
- Population: Uninhabited

Kitney Island is a small island 2 kilometres (1 nmi) east-northeast of the Smith Rocks, 2 kilometres (1 nmi) southwest of the Wiltshire Rocks, and 5 kilometres (2.5 nmi) northwest of the Paterson Islands, off the coast of Mac. Robertson Land, Antarctica. The Lars Christensen Expedition (1936) first mapped this island which, though left unnamed, was included in a small group named by them "Spjotoyskjera" (now the Wiltshire Rocks). It was remapped by the Australian National Antarctic Research Expedition (ANARE) in 1956, and was named by the Antarctic Names Committee of Australia for V.J. Kitney, a supervising technician (radio) at Mawson Station in 1968.

== See also ==
- List of Antarctic and sub-Antarctic islands
