= Dovers Peak =

Mountain in Antarctica

Dovers Peak (69°42′S 64°26′E) is a peak in the western part of the Stinear Nunataks in Mac. Robertson Land. It was discovered in 1954 by an Australian National Antarctic Research Expeditions party led by Robert G. Dovers, officer in charge at Mawson Station in 1954, for whom it is named.
