= Jocelyn Islands =

Group of islands in Holme Bay, Antarctica

- Location within Antarctica

Geography
- Location: Antarctica
- Coordinates: 67°35′S 62°42′E

Administration
- Administered under the Antarctic Treaty System

Demographics
- Population: Uninhabited

The Jocelyn Islands are a group of islands lying between the Flat Islands and the Rouse Islands in the eastern part of Holme Bay, Mac. Robertson Land, Antarctica. The group, which is made up (going west-to-east) the Lee Island, Verner Island, and Petersen Island, were mapped by Norwegian cartographers from air photos taken by the Lars Christensen Expedition, 1936–37, and named Meholmane (the middle islands). They were renamed in 1960 by Australian National Antarctic Research Expeditions (ANARE) for Jocelyn Terry, who for a number of years broadcast news and messages to Antarctica from Radio Australia.

== See also ==
- Composite Antarctic Gazetteer
- List of Antarctic islands south of 60° S
- SCAR
- Territorial claims in Antarctica
