= Giganteus Island =

Island of the coast of eastern Antarctica

- Location within Antarctica

Geography
- Location: Antarctica
- Coordinates: 67°35′S 62°30′E
- Highest elevation: 27 m (89 ft)

Administration
- Administered under the Antarctic Treaty System

Demographics
- Population: Uninhabited

Giganteus Island is the most northern of the Rookery Islands in the west part of Holme Bay, MacRobertson Land. Mapped by Norwegian cartographers from air photos taken by the Lars Christensen Expedition, 1936–37. A giant petrel (Macronectes giganteus) rookery was observed by ANARE on the island in December 1958, hence the name.

== See also ==
- Composite Antarctic Gazetteer
- List of Antarctic islands south of 60° S
- SCAR
- Territorial claims in Antarctica
