= Kellas Islands =

Islands in Antarctica

- Location within Antarctica

Geography
- Location: Antarctica
- Coordinates: 67°33′S 62°46′E

Administration
- Administered under the Antarctic Treaty System

Demographics
- Population: Uninhabited

Kellas Islands are two small islands 1 kilometre (0.5 nmi) south of the Parallactic Islands in Holme Bay, Mac. Robertson Land, Antarctica. They were plotted from photos taken from Australian National Antarctic Research Expeditions aircraft in 1958 and 1959, and were named by the Antarctic Names Committee of Australia for William Robert Anthony Kellas, a weather observer at Mawson Station in 1960.

== See also ==
- List of Antarctic and sub-Antarctic islands
