= Nost =

Nost may refer to:

== People ==
- John Nost (died 1729), Flemish sculptor
- John Nost Sartorius (1755–1828), English painter
- John van Nost the younger, English sculptor

== Television ==
- NOST, American broadcast and digital television network

== Other ==
- Nost, an album by German musician Ellen Allien

== See also ==
- Nøst (disambiguation)
