= Welch Rocks =

- Location within Antarctica

Geography
- Location: Antarctica
- Coordinates: 67°33′S 62°54′E

Administration
- Administered under the Antarctic Treaty System

Demographics
- Population: Uninhabited

Welch Rocks are two rocks 1 kilometre (0.5 nmi) north of Welch Island in the east part of Holme Bay, Mac. Robertson Land. Plotted from photos taken from ANARE (Australian National Antarctic Research Expeditions) aircraft in 1958 and 1959. Named by Antarctic Names Committee of Australia (ANCA) after Welch Island.
