= Wiltshire Rocks =

- Location within Antarctica

Geography
- Location: Antarctica
- Coordinates: 67°30′S 63°7′E

Administration
- Administered under the Antarctic Treaty System

Demographics
- Population: Uninhabited

Wiltshire Rocks is a group of rocks in the sea about 4.6 kilometres (2.5 nmi) east-northeast of Smith Rocks, 2.8 kilometres (1.5 nmi) east of Kitney Island, and 4.6 kilometres (2.5 nmi) northwest of Paterson Islands, off the coast of Mac. Robertson Land. First mapped from air photographs by the Lars Christensen Expedition, 1936–37, and named Spjotoyskjera. Renamed (1971) by Antarctic Names Committee of Australia (ANCA) for A.C.W. Wiltshire, cook at Mawson Station in 1963.
