= Walsh Bluff =

Walsh Bluff (53°6′S 73°23′E) is a rock bluff close north of the mouth of Abbotsmith Glacier on the west side of Heard Island. Surveyed by ANARE (Australian National Antarctic Research Expeditions) in 1948. Named by Antarctic Names Committee of Australia (ANCA) for J.E. Walsh, ANARE weather observer on Heard Island in 1950 and 1954; dog attendant at Heard Island in 1951.
