= Williams Rocks =

- Location within Antarctica

Geography
- Location: Antarctica
- Coordinates: 67°26′S 62°46′E

Administration
- Administered under the Antarctic Treaty System

Demographics
- Population: Uninhabited

The Williams Rocks are a group of islands, being essentially rocks located 17 km (9 nmi) north of Flat Islands and Holme Bay, off the coast of Mac. Robertson Land. The Williams Rocks were mapped by Robert G. Dovers of the ANARE in 1954. The Williams Rocks were named by the ANCA for J. Williams, assistant diesel mechanic at Mawson Station in 1962, who assisted in a triangulation of the Williams Rocks and the erection of a beacon.

== See also ==
- Composite Antarctic Gazetteer
- List of Antarctic islands south of 60° S
- SCAR
- Territorial claims in Antarctica
