= Robert G. Dovers =

Australian explorer

Robert G. Dovers was an Australian explorer and cartographer, born in 1922. He was known to be in the ANARE (Australian National Antarctic Research Expeditions) party in the 1950s. He mapped Nelson Rock in 1954.

Dovers led an ANARE expedition and discovered Dovers Peak, which was named after him. Dovers Moraine and Mt. Dovers also bear his name.
