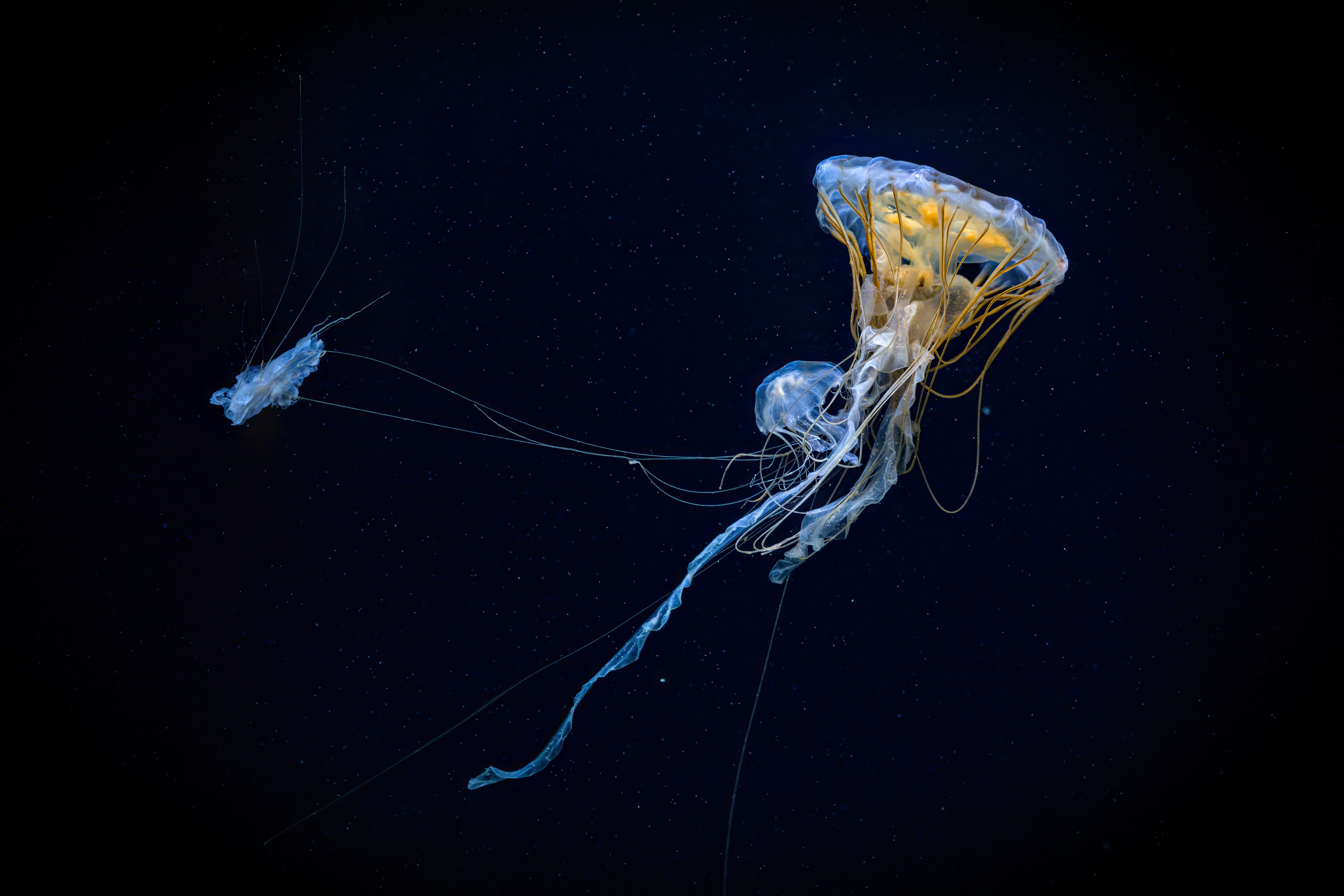

Scientific classification
- Kingdom: Animalia
- Phylum: Cnidaria
- Class: Scyphozoa
- Order: Semaeostomeae
- Family: Pelagiidae
- Genus: Chrysaora
- Species: C. hysoscella

Binomial name
- Chrysaora hysoscella (Linnaeus, 1766)

Synonyms
- Chrysaora aspilonota Péron & Lesueur, 1810; Chrysaora cyclonota Péron & Lesueur, 1810; Chrysaora lesueur Péron & Lesueur, 1810; Chrysaora mediterranea Péron & Lesueur, 1810; Medusa hysoscella Linnaeus, 1767

= Chrysaora hysoscella =

Compass jellyfish

Species of jellyfish

Chrysaora hysoscella, the compass jellyfish, is a common species of jellyfish that inhabits coastal waters in temperate regions of the northeastern Atlantic Ocean, including the North Sea and Mediterranean Sea. In the past it was also recorded in the southeastern Atlantic, including South Africa, but this was caused by confusion with close relatives; C. africana, C. fulgida and an undescribed species tentatively referred to as "C. agulhensis".

It is a true jellyfish displaying radial symmetry with distinct brown markings shaped like elongated V's on its bell. C. hysoscella adults are highly susceptible to the parasite Hyperia medusarum, but this has had no significant effects on the population. This organism has a benthic polyp stage before developing into a pelagic adult medusae. Compass jellyfish consume a variety of marine invertebrates and plankton and are preyed on by very few. C. hysoscella contribute to the global issue of jellyfish overpopulation which is concerning to humans for various reasons including recreational interference, economic turmoil for fishing communities, and depleted fish resources.

== Body plan ==
As an adult, the bell of the compass jellyfish typically has a diameter of 15–25 cm (5.9–9.8 in). It usually has 16 brown elongated V-shaped markings on the translucent yellow-white bell. The markings surround a central brown spot and resemble the face of a compass, hence the common name compass jellyfish. Juveniles on the other hand lack the compass pattern, they appear white and polka dotted with a reddish fringe on the edge of their bell.

It is usually colored yellowish white, with some brown. Its 24 tentacles are arranged in eight groups of three. Each tentacle has stinging cells for capturing prey and defense from predators. A sense organ is located between each group of tentacles, which can perceive changes in light and helps the jellyfish determine and maintain its position in the water column. It has 4 oral arms that can be distinguished from the tentacles because the arms are noticeably longer and have a folded, frilly appearance. These arms are used to facilitate transfer of captured prey from the tentacles to the mouth which is between the oral arms at the center of the underside of the bell.

== Habitat ==
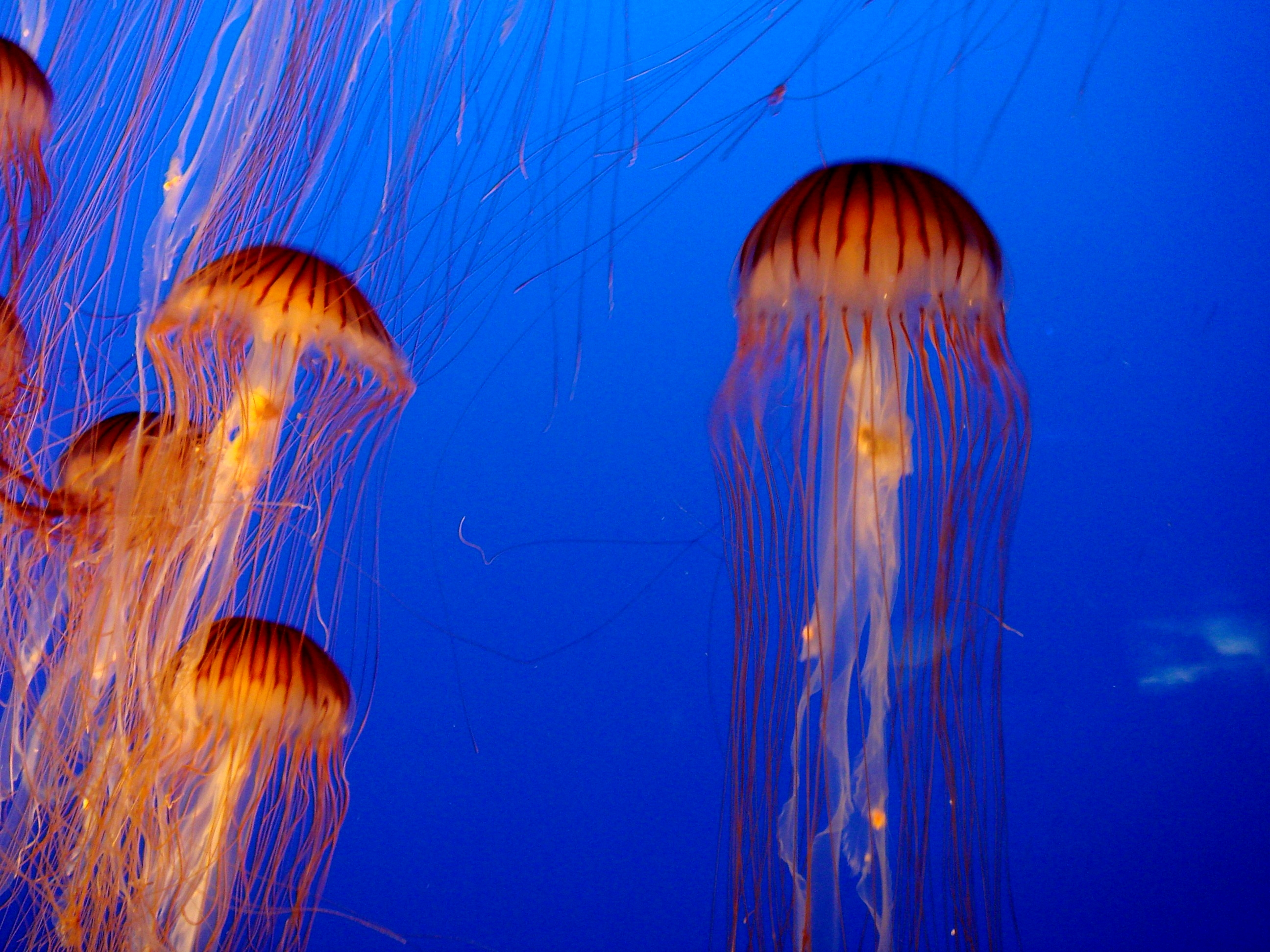
Chrysaora hysoscella in Vancouver Aquarium

Video of the Chrysaora hysoscella (compass jellyfish) from the Monterey Bay Aquarium

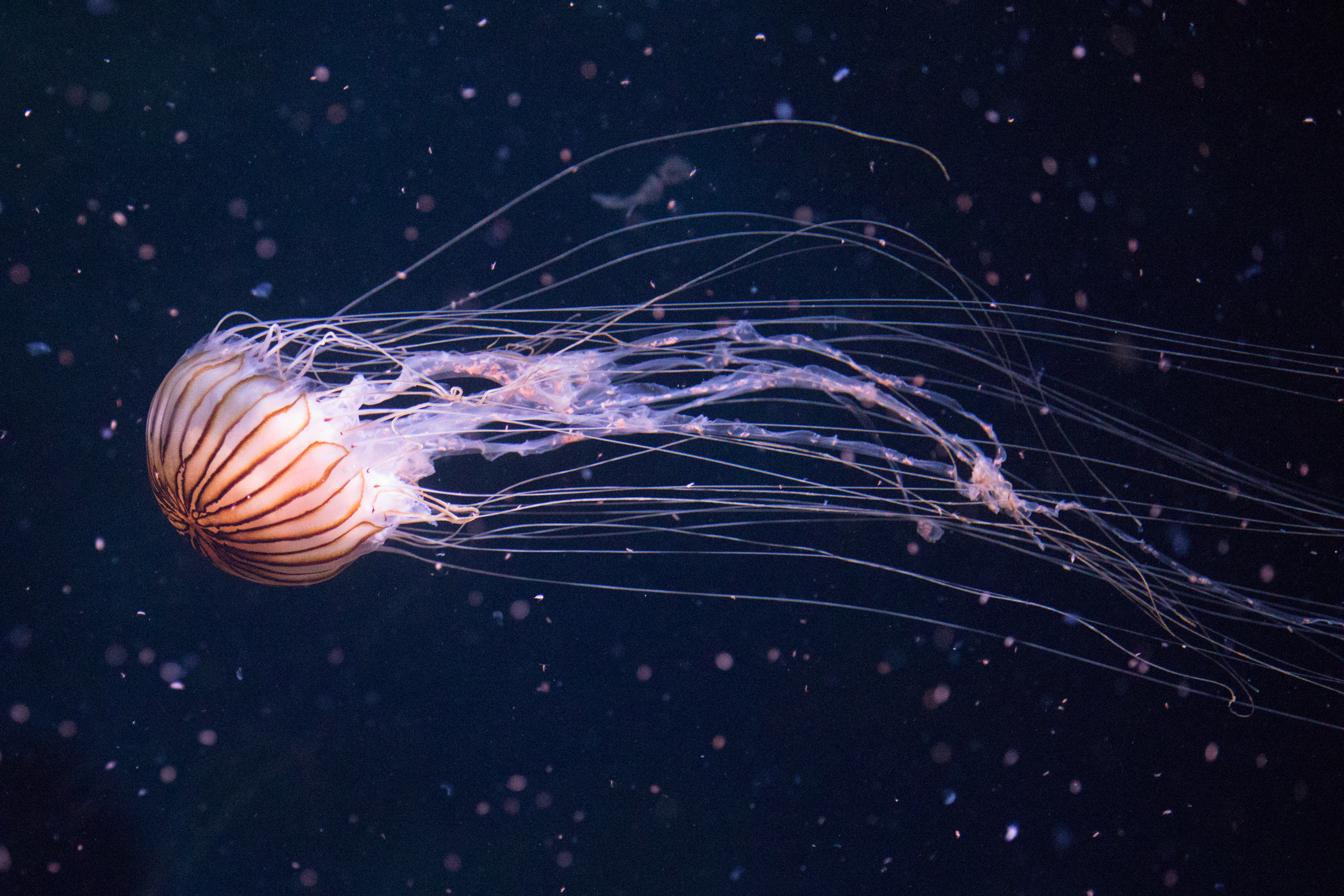
Chrysaora hysoscella at Ozeaneum Stralsund

The compass jellyfish is found in coastal waters of the northeast Atlantic, including the Celtic, Irish, North and Mediterranean Seas. They inhabit these waters mostly at the top of the water column, and although they inhabit shallow water, they move up and down in the water column often ranging from surface waters to just above the seabed. They are rarely found deeper than 30 m from the surface.

== Feeding and predation ==
Compass jellyfish are carnivores, consuming other marine invertebrates and plankton. They feed on a variety of benthic and pelagic organisms including but not limited to: dinoflagellates, copepods, crustacean eggs, larval fish, and chaetognaths. They stun and capture their prey with stinging cells on their tentacles. The oral arms facilitate movement of captured prey into the oral opening. Compass jellyfish have very few predators. They are known to be consumed by the leatherback sea turtle and ocean sunfish.

== Life cycle ==
Like other Scyphozoans, Chrysaora hysoscella undergo metamorphosis as the organism develops and experiences a polyp and then medusa form. Females release planular larvae which swim to find a suitable place to settle. The planulae attach to a benthic substrate and develop into a sessile polyp which releases immature medusae through asexual reproduction called strobilation. Chrysaora hysoscella function as a male upon maturity and then develop female gametes, meaning this organism is protandrously hermaphroditic.

== Reproduction ==
Chrysaora hysoscella utilize both sexual and asexual reproduction throughout development. Mature individuals reproduce sexually by broadcast spawning. Males release sperm from their mouths into the water column. Females fertilize the sperm internally and can fertilize sperm from multiple male partners. The larvae released from the female settle as benthic polyps that reproduce asexually. The polyps release multiple ephyrae through strobilation. Ephyrae are the earliest form of the medusa stage. Research indicates that Chrysaora hysoscella polyps are capable of releasing ephyrae over time and therefore are not limited to a single reproductive event.

== Parasite Hyperia medusarum ==
Adult Chrysaora hysoscella are often parasitised by Hyperia medusarum. C. hysoscella found inshore and closer to the surface are more likely to have the parasite. The parasite can be found inside of the body cavity in the umbrella and gonads but tends to move from umbrella to gonads if there is space for them there. The gonads are more enriched in carbon and protein content then any other part of the body, making this region the ideal location to settle and feed. They have also been found on the oral arms of the jellyfish where they can eat prey caught by the medusae.

== Effects of global warming ==
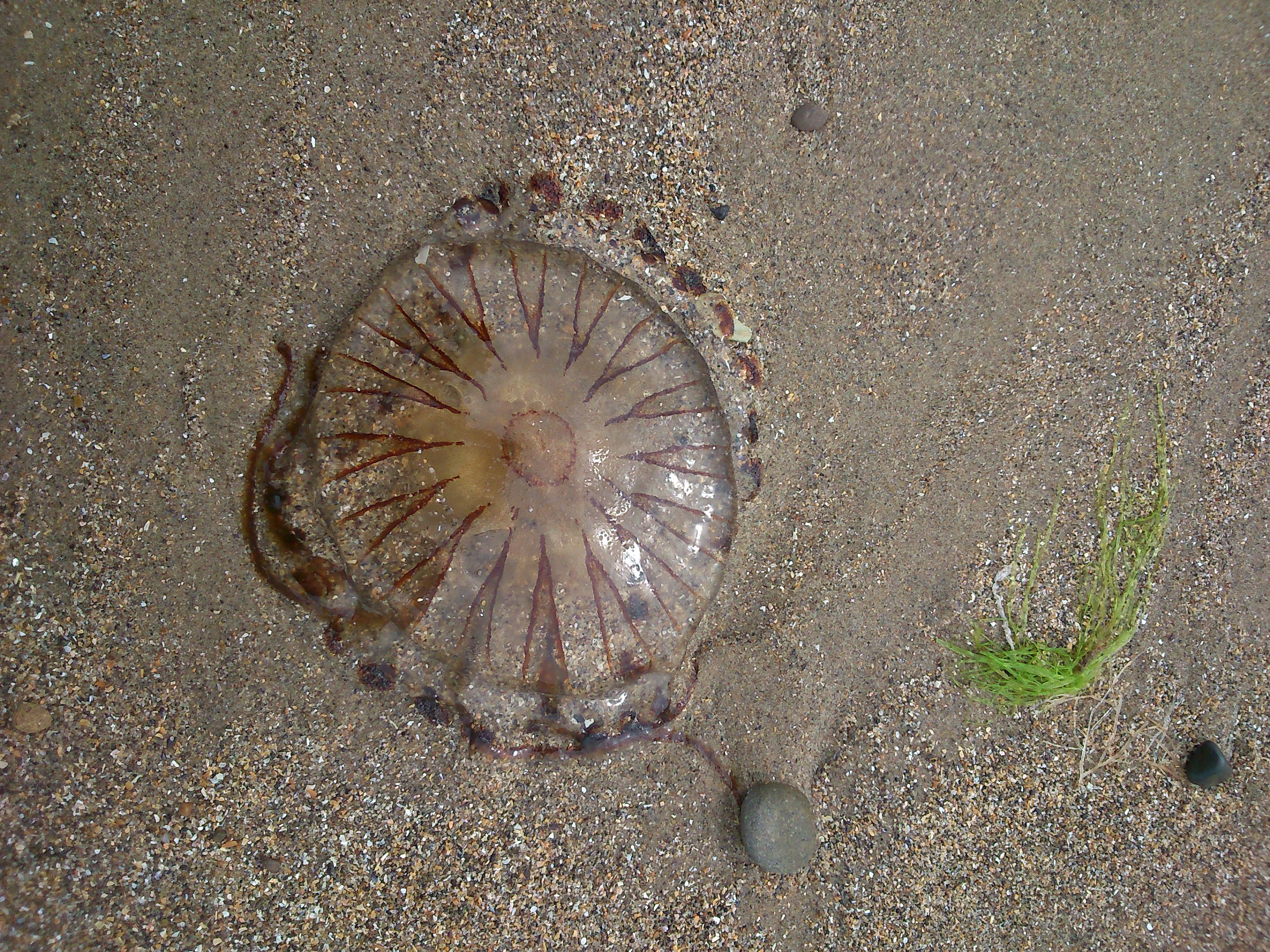
Chrysaora Hysoscella Malahide beach (Ireland)

Scyphozoa populations are increasing with the warming climate and warmer ocean temperatures. Studies suggest that warmer winter temperatures allow for a longer strobilation period and subsequently higher ephyra production per polyp, higher percentages of polyp strobilation, and higher polyp survival rate. Polyps will be more successful in warmer temperatures but not in extreme temperatures. C. hysoscella are predicted to migrate further northwards to maintain ideal conditions.

=== Impact ===
Overpopulation of jellyfish is a concern to humans for many reasons. Thriving jellyfish populations have been found to take over as top predators in areas where fin fish have been over-exploited. Increased abundance of jellyfish negatively impacts fish populations in the same region because jellyfish feed on fish eggs and larvae. Jellyfish and larval fish can also share common dietary preferences. Competition for food resources can result in depleted fish populations. Compass Jellyfish have a painful sting that can cause irritation, burning, and redness for several hours. Fishing nets can be overwhelmed with, or torn by the weight of jellyfish bycatch. Most jellyfish, including compass jellyfish, can clog water inlets to power plants, causing serious problems for power production. This species has been known to hinder diamond mining through stopping sediment suction.Jellyfish can invade aquaculture cages, ruining the production of the organism being farmed.
