= Rookery Islands =

Islands of Antarctica

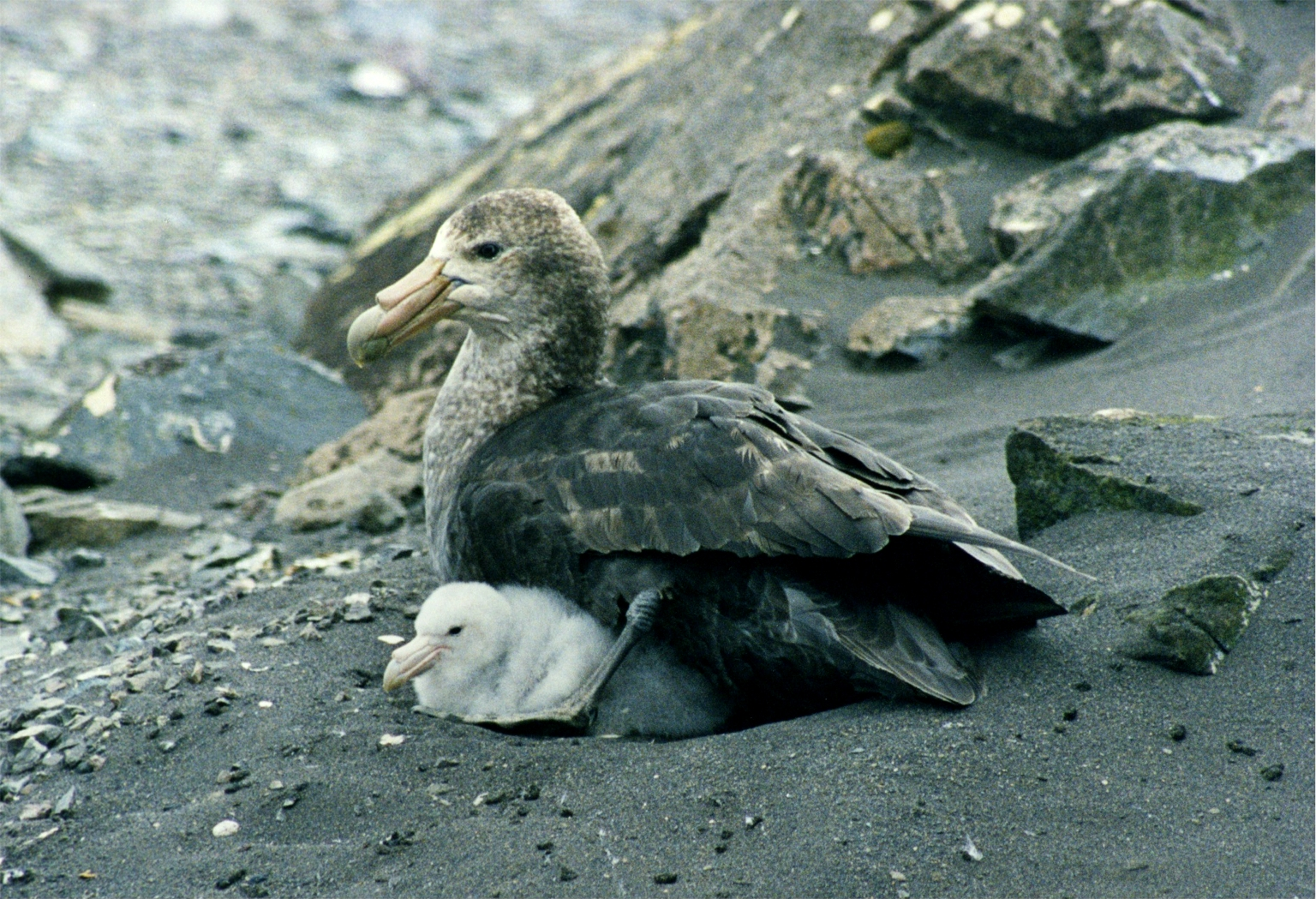
- The islands are at the southern limit of the breeding range of southern giant petrels

- Location within Antarctica

Geography
- Location: Mac. Robertson Land, Antarctica
- Coordinates: 67°36′37″S 62°32′07″E
- Total islands: 75

Administration
- Administered under the Antarctic Treaty System

Demographics
- Population: Uninhabited

The Rookery Islands are a group of rocks and small islands in western Holme Bay, north of the David and Masson Ranges, on the Mawson Coast of Mac.Robertson Land in East Antarctica. The largest in the group are Giganteus Island in the north-west, 600 m long by 400 m wide, and Rookery Island in the south, 1 km long and 250 m wide. The islands are rocky and of low relief, rising to heights of 60 m on Rookery Island, 25 m on Giganteus Island, and ranging from 10 – 30 m on the smaller islands. The nearest permanent research station is Australia's Mawson, some 15 km to the east in Holme Bay.

== Environment ==
The group contains breeding colonies of Adélie penguins, Cape petrels, snow petrels, southern giant petrels (which breed nowhere else in the region), Wilson's storm petrels and Antarctic skuas. The islands are protected under the Antarctic Treaty System as Antarctic Specially Protected Area (ASPA) No.102. The 89 ha site has also been designated an Important Bird Area (IBA) by BirdLife International, principally because of the Adélie Penguin colony.
