= Nøst Island =

Island in Antarctica

- Location within Antarctica

Geography
- Location: Antarctica
- Coordinates: 67°37′S 62°41′E

Administration
- Administered under the Antarctic Treaty System

Demographics
- Population: Uninhabited

Nøst Island is an island less than 0.9 kilometres (0.5 nmi) long, 3.7 kilometres (2 nmi) west-southwest of Evans Island in the south part of Holme Bay. Mapped by Norwegian cartographers from aerial photographs taken by the Lars Christensen Expedition, 1936–37, and called by them Nøstet (the boatshed).

== See also ==
- List of Antarctic and sub-Antarctic islands
