= Parallactic Islands =

Island group in Antarctica

- Location within Antarctica

Geography
- Location: Antarctica
- Coordinates: 67°32′S 62°46′E
- Total islands: 6

Administration
- Administered under the Antarctic Treaty System

Demographics
- Population: Uninhabited

The Parallactic Islands refers to a group of 6 small islands between the Azimuth and Kellas Islands in Holme Bay, Mac. Robertson Land. Mapped by Norwegian cartographers from air photos taken by the Lars Christensen Expedition, 1936–37. Named by Antarctic Names Committee of Australia (ANCA) after Parallactic Island, one of the group.

== See also ==
- List of Antarctic and sub-Antarctic islands
