= Round Hill (Heard Island) =

Hill on Heard Island

Coordinates: 53°4′S 73°38′E

Round Hill is an ice-free, rounded hill (380 m) rising southward of Fairchild Beach and between Compton Glacier and Brown Glacier, on the northeast side of Heard Island. Travelling westwards from the sandy Fairchild Beach at the base of Round Hill, one arrives at the rocky Gilchrist Beach.

The feature is roughly mapped on the 1874 chart by the Challenger expedition. It was surveyed and given this descriptive name by ANARE (Australian National Antarctic Research Expeditions) in 1948.
