= Møller Bank =

- Submerged bank Møller Bank (Antarctica)
- Interactive map of Møller Bank
- Ocean: Southern Ocean

Møller Bank (67°34′S 62°52′E) is a submerged bank, with least depth of 32 metres (105 ft), at the northern end of Kista Strait, 1 nautical mile (2 km) west of Welch Island, and just east of Carstens Shoal, in Holme Bay, Mac. Robertson Land, Antarctica. It was charted in February 1961 by d'A.T. Gale, a hydrographic surveyor with the Australian National Antarctic Research Expeditions (Thala Dan), and was named by the Antarctic Names Committee of Australia for J. Wennerberg Møller, third mate on the Thala Dan in 1961, who assisted in the hydrographic survey.
