= Béchervaise Island =

Island in Antarctica

- Location within Antarctica

Geography
- Location: Antarctica
- Coordinates: 67°35′S 62°49′E
- Archipelago: Flat Islands

Administration
- Administered under the Antarctic Treaty System

Demographics
- Population: Uninhabited

Béchervaise Island is the largest of the Flat Islands, located just west of Stinear Island in Holme Bay, Mac. Robertson Land. It is one of several plotted as a part of "Flatøy" ("Flat Island") by Norwegian cartographers from air photos taken by the 1936–37 Lars Christensen Expedition, but was found to be a separate island by the Australian National Antarctic Research Expeditions in 1954 and named for John Béchervaise, officer in charge at Mawson Station in 1955 and 1959.

== See also ==
- Composite Antarctic Gazetteer
- List of Antarctic islands south of 60° S
- Scientific Committee on Antarctic Research
- Territorial claims in Antarctica
