= Azimuth Islands =

- Location within Antarctica

Geography
- Location: Antarctica
- Coordinates: 67°32′S 62°44′E

Administration
- Administered under the Antarctic Treaty System

Demographics
- Population: Uninhabited

Azimuth Islands are a group of 4 small islands lying 1.9 km (1 nmi) northwest of the Parallactic Islands in Holme Bay, Antarctica. They share their name with the largest island in the group, Azimuth Island (67°32′S 62°44′E). Mapped by Norwegian cartographers from air photos taken by the Lars Christensen Expedition, 1936-37. So named by the Antarctic Names Committee of Australia (ANCA) because the largest island in the group was included in a triangulation survey by ANARE (Australian National Antarctic Research Expeditions) in 1959.

== See also ==
- Composite Antarctic Gazetteer
- List of Antarctic islands south of 60° S
- SCAR
- Territorial claims in Antarctica
