= Compton Glacier =

Glacier on Heard Island in the southern Indian Ocean

- Location of Heard Island and McDonald Islands on the globe

- Location within Indian Ocean
- Interactive map of Compton Glacier
- Type: cirque / tidewater
- Location: Heard Island; Territory of Heard Island and McDonald Islands; Australia
- Coordinates: 53°3′S 73°37′E
- Length: 3 nautical miles (6 km)
- Thickness: 55 m (180 ft)
- Terminus: Compton Lagoon, between Gilchrist Beach and Fairchild Beach
- Status: Retreating

Compton Glacier is a glacier, 3 nautical miles (6 km) long, flowing northeast from the lower slopes of the Big Ben massif to the northeast side of Heard Island in the southern Indian Ocean. Its terminus is located at Compton Lagoon, between Gilchrist Beach and Fairchild Beach. To the northwest of Compton Glacier is Ealey Glacier, whose terminus is located close southeast of Cape Bidlingmaier. To the southeast of Compton Glacier is Brown Glacier, whose terminus is located at Brown Lagoon. Round Hill separates Compton Glacier from Brown Glacier. Since the ANARE survey of 1947/48, the glacier has retreated significantly, exposing much more of Compton Lagoon. Evidence for significant loss was recorded as early as 1963, with an expedition describing the glacier as no longer smooth, but crevassed. By the late 1970s it had retreated 1.6 km and by the time of a 1987 survey, it was 2.5 km inland from its 1947 front.

== Discovery and naming ==
The lower reaches of this glacier were charted and named Morgan's Iceberg on an 1860 sketch map compiled by Captain H.C. Chester, American sealer operating in the area during this period. The feature was surveyed in 1947/48 by the Australian National Antarctic Research Expeditions, who applied the name Compton Glacier for G.S. Compton, assistant surveyor with the expedition.
