= Fairchild Beach =

Sandy beach on the east side of Heard Island in the southern Indian Ocean

Fairchild Beach (53°4′S 73°39′E) is a sandy beach, 0.32 nautical miles (0.6 km) wide and 1 nautical mile (2 km) long, which extends north from the base of Round Hill to the south side of the terminus of Compton Glacier, on the east side of Heard Island in the southern Indian Ocean. The beach faces Compton Lagoon, and at its western edge communicates with the rocky Gilchrist Beach. To the south of Fairchild Beach is Brown Glacier, whose terminus is located at Brown Lagoon.

The name "Fairchild's Beach" was in use by American sealers as early as 1857, but the origin of the name is not known.

== Maps ==
- Heard Island and McDonald Islands including all major topographical features
