= Welch Island =

Island of Antarctica

- Location within Antarctica

Geography
- Location: Antarctica
- Coordinates: 67°34′S 62°56′E
- Length: 1.8 km (1.12 mi)
- Width: 1 km (0.6 mi)
- Highest elevation: 130 m (430 ft)

Administration
- Administered under the Antarctic Treaty System

Demographics
- Population: Uninhabited

Welch Island is an island, 1.8 km (1.1 mi) long with a prominent pinnacle rock of 130 m (427 ft), lying north of the Rouse Islands and 2 km (1.2 mi) off the eastern side of Holme Bay in Mac. Robertson Land, Antarctica. It lies 1 km (0.6 mi) south of Welch Rocks.

== Discovery and naming ==
Welch Island was discovered in February 1931 by the British Australian and New Zealand Antarctic Research Expedition (BANZARE) under Sir Douglas Mawson, who named it for B. F. Welch, Second Engineer on the RRS Discovery.

== Important Bird Area ==
A 415 ha site comprising Welch Island, neighbouring Klung Island, and the intervening smaller islands and marine area, has been designated an Important Bird Area (IBA) by BirdLife International because it supports about 36,000 breeding pairs of Adélie penguins, based on 2012 satellite imagery. Snow petrels breed on high ground on the islands. The islands are mostly ice-free in summer and several lakes are present.

== See also ==
- Composite Antarctic Gazetteer
- List of Antarctic islands south of 60° S
- SCAR
- Territorial claims in Antarctica
- Møller Bank
