= Evans Island (Malaysia) =

Island in Kinabatangan, Malaysia

- Interactive map of Evans Island

Geography
- Coordinates: 5°23′26″N 118°56′20″E

Administration
- Malaysia
- State: Sabah
- Division: Tawau
- District: Lahad Datu

Evans Island (Malay: Pulau Evans) is an island located Kinabatangan District, Sabah, Malaysia.
