= Kista Strait =

Kista Strait (67°35′S 62°51′E) is a strait between the Flat Islands and Jocelyn Islands in Holme Bay, Mac. Robertson Land, Antarctica. It was mapped by Norwegian cartographers from air photos taken by the Lars Christensen Expedition, 1936–37. The strait was first navigated by the site on which Australian National Antarctic Research Expeditions (ANARE) established Mawson Station.
