= Vanhoffen Bluff =

Vanhoffen Bluff (53°0′S 73°21′E) is a rocky bluff (225 m) immediately east of Jacka Glacier on the north coast of Heard Island. It is named for Ernst Vanhöffen (1858–1918), a German zoologist, and a member of the Gauss expedition under the leadership of Erich von Drygalski (1865–1949). During its 1902 investigations of the area, Drygalski applied the name Kap Vanhoffen to a cliffed feature about 1.5 nautical miles (2.8 km) to the northwest, near The Sentinel. The ANARE (Australian National Antarctic Research Expeditions), during its 1948 survey of the island, transferred the Vanhoffen name to this bluff, reporting that no well-marked cape exists along the high cliffs to the northwest.
