= Carstens Shoal =

Shoal in Mac. Robertson Land, Antarctica

Carstens Shoal (67°34′S 62°51′E) is an almost circular shoal (least depth 11.89 metres (39 ft)) lying just north of East Budd Island, and just west of Moller Bank, in Holme Bay, Mac. Robertson Land. It was charted in February 1961 by d'A.T. Gale, hydrographic surveyor with the Australian National Antarctic Research Expeditions (Thala Dan), and named by the Antarctic Names Committee of Australia for D.R. Carstens, surveyor at Mawson Station in 1962, who assisted the hydrographic survey in 1961.
