= Gilchrist Beach =

Beach on Heard Island

Gilchrist Beach (53°2′S 73°36′E) is a rocky beach, 1 nautical mile (1.9 km) long, lying west of Compton Glacier on the north side of Heard Island. At its eastern edge, Gilchrist Beach communicates with the sandy Fairchild Beach. Travelling eastwards from Gilchrist Beach to Fairchild Beach, one arrives at the base of Round Hill.

This feature was known to American sealers as Rocky Beach as early as 1857, as shown by an unpublished sealer's map of "Hurds Island" compiled during the 1860–1870 period. The name Stoney Beach was also in use during this period.

The name Gilchrist Beach, as applied by the ANARE (Australian National Antarctic Research Expeditions) during its 1948 survey of the island, is now established in usage. Dr. Alan R. Gilchrist served as medical officer with the ANARE party.
