= Dovers Moraine =

Band of glacial moraine in Antarctica

Dovers Moraine (53°7′S 73°42′E) is a band of coarse glacial moraine, extending in a north–south direction for 1.5 nautical miles (3 km), deposited at the east end of the main mass of Heard Island immediately east of Stephenson Glacier. It was surveyed in 1948 by the Australian National Antarctic Research Expeditions, and named by them for Robert G. Dovers, geologist and chief surveyor with the party. Small settlements were occupied near both ends of this morainal belt by American sealers engaged in the extraction of oil from elephant seals during the 1858–82 period.
