= Lambeth Bluff =

Rock coastal bluff on Heard Island

Lambeth Bluff (53°11′S 73°36′E) is a rock coastal bluff at the end of South Barrier, on the east side of Fiftyone Glacier, on the south side of Heard Island. It was surveyed in 1948 by the Australian National Antarctic Research Expeditions (ANARE) and named "Cape Lambeth" for A. James Lambeth, a geologist with the expedition. Further ANARE exploration led to revision of the name in 1964 to Lambeth Bluff.
