= Winston Lagoon =

Lagoon indenting the southeast coast of Heard Island in the southern Indian Ocean

Winston Lagoon (53°9′S 73°39′E) is a lagoon indenting the southeast coast of Heard Island in the southern Indian Ocean, about 1 nautical mile (1.9 km) northeast of Cape Lockyer. The feature is roughly portrayed on an American sealer chart of the 1860 period. It was sighted from the air by Lieutenant Malcolm Smith, RAAF, pilot of the ANARE (Australian National Antarctic Research Expeditions) seaplane that made the first reconnaissance flight over the island in 1948. Lieutenant Smith proposed that it be named Lake Winston after his wife. In view of his death in an aircraft accident shortly afterward, this proposal was adopted by Australian Antarctic Names and Medals Committee (ANCA) with only a change of generic term.
