= Ernst Vanhöffen =

German zoologist (1858–1918)

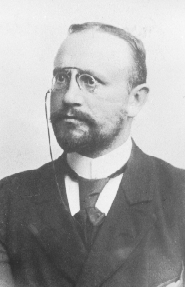
- Born: 15 October 1858; Wehlau, Kingdom of Prussia
- Died: 14 June 1918 (aged 59); Legitten, Germany (now Russia)
- Education: Humboldt University of Berlin; University of Königsberg
- Scientific career
- Fields: Zoology
- Workplaces: University of Kiel

Ernst Vanhöffen (15 November 1858, in Wehlau – 14 June 1918) was a German zoologist.

== Biography ==
He was born on 15 November 1858, in Wehlau. He studied geology, botany and zoology at the universities of Berlin and Königsberg, graduating in 1888 with the thesis Untersuchungen über semaeostome und rhizostome Medusen. In 1889 and 1890, he conducted research of jellyfish at the Stazione Zoologica Anton Dohrn in Naples.

In 1892 and 1893, he participated in a Gesellschaft für Erdkunde zu Berlin-sponsored expedition to West Greenland under the leadership of Erich von Drygalski (1865–1949). Afterwards, he worked for a few years at the Institute of Zoology in Kiel. In 1898 and 1899, he took part in the Deutschen Tiefsee-Expedition aboard the steamship "Valdivia". From an abundant yield of deep-sea marine fauna collected on the expedition, Vanhöffen was tasked with processing medusa species.

After his return to Germany, he served as a lecturer at the University of Kiel, attaining the title of professor in March 1901. From August 1901 to November 1903, he was a member of the Deutschen Südpolar-Expedition aboard the research vessel "Gauss". Led by Erich von Drygalski, the expedition endured periods of hardship due to the "Gauss" being trapped in Antarctic ice for several months. He died on 14 June 1918, aged 58, in Legitten. Vanhoffen Bluff (Coordinates: 53°0′S 73°21′E) was named in his honor.

== Written works ==
- Untersuchungen über semaeostome und rhizostome Medusen, 1888 – Analysis of Semaeostomeae and Rhizostome medusae. (graduate thesis).
- Die akalephen der Plankton-expedition, 1892 – Acalephae from the "Plankton-expedition".
- Die acraspeden Medusen der deutschen Tiefsee-Expedition 1898–1899. Mit Tafel I-VIII, 1902 – Craspedota medusae from the German Deep-sea Expedition 1898–1899.
- Die Anthomedusen und Leptomedusen der Deutschen Tiefsee-Expedition 1898–1899, 1911 – Anthomedusae and Leptomedusae from the German Deep-sea Expedition 1898–1899.
- Die Craspedoten Medusen der Deutschen Südpolar-Expedition 1901–1903, 1912 – Craspedota medusae from the German South Polar Expedition 1901–1903.
- Die Isopoden der Deutschen Südpolar-Expedition, 1901–1903, 1914 – Isopoda from the German South Polar Expedition 1901–1903.

== Taxon described by him ==
- See Category:Taxa named by Ernst Vanhöffen

== Taxon named in his honor ==
- Diaphus vanhoeffeni, is a species of lanternfish found in the Eastern Atlantic Ocean.
- Gigantactis vanhoeffeni, is a species of deep-sea anglerfish found around the World.
