= Cape Lockyer =

Steep rock headland on the southeast side of Heard Island

Cape Lockyer (53°10′S 73°38′E) is a steep rock headland 1.5 nautical miles (3 km) northeast of Lambeth Bluff on the southeast side of Heard Island. It was surveyed in 1948 by Australian National Antarctic Research Expeditions and named by them for Lieutenant H.C.J. Lockyer, Royal Australian Naval Volunteer Reserve, one of the officers on HMAS Labuan, relief ship for the expedition.
