= Flat Islands (Antarctica) =

Island chain in Antarctica

- Location within Antarctica

Geography
- Location: Antarctica
- Coordinates: 67°36′S 62°49′E

Administration
- Administered under the Antarctic Treaty System

Demographics
- Population: Uninhabited

The Flat Islands or Flatøyholmane are a small chain of islands that extend 5 km (2.5 nmi) in a northeast–southwest direction, lying about 3 km (1.9 mi) northwest of Mawson Station and 3.2 km (2 mi) southwest of Welch Island in the eastern part of Holme Bay. The Flat Islands were mapped by Norwegian cartographers from air photos taken by the Lars Christensen Expedition (1936–1937) and the name Flatøyholmane (the Flat Island Islets) was applied to the group at the south end of the chain. The island mapped as Flatøy on the Norwegian map is actually three islands. Following surveys by the Australian National Antarctic Research Expeditions (ANARE), the Antarctic Names Committee of Australia (ANCA) recommended in 1958 that the descriptive name Flat Islands be applied for the entire group. The group is made up of Stinear Island and Béchervaise Island, amongst others.

== See also ==
- Composite Antarctic Gazetteer
- List of Antarctic islands south of 60° S
- SCAR
- Territorial claims in Antarctica
