= Holme Bay =

Bay in Antarctica in Mac. Robertson Land

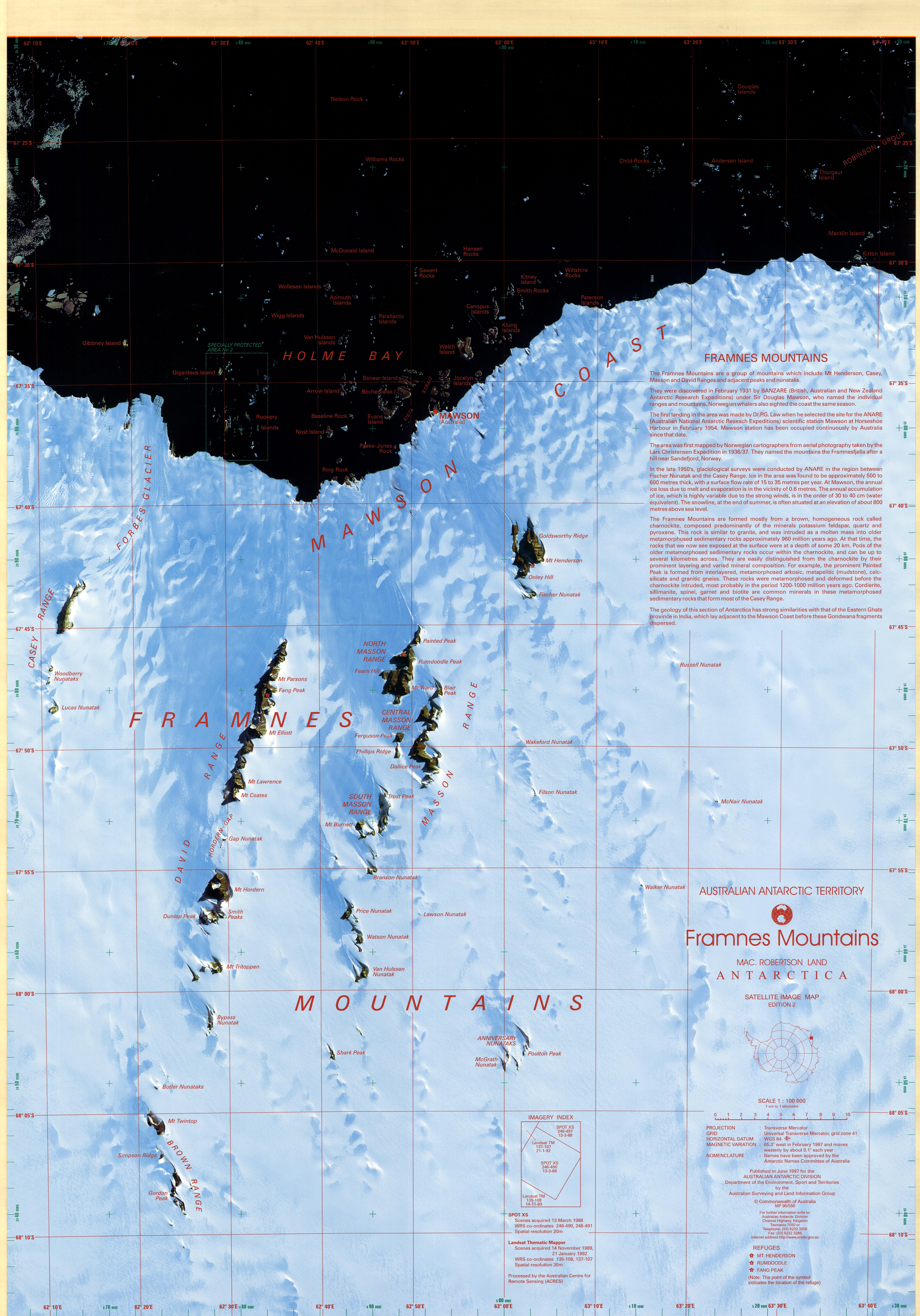
Holme Bay

Holme Bay is a bay in Antarctica in Mac. Robertson Land, 22 miles (35 km) wide, containing many islands, indenting the coast 5 miles (8 km) north of the Framnes Mountains. Holme Bay is largely snow-free and was mapped by Norwegian cartographers from aerial photographs taken by the Lars Christensen Expedition in January-February 1937, and named Holmevika because of its island-studded character (holme means "islet" in Norwegian) .

== The Rouse and Bay Islands ==
- Azimuth Islands
- Flat Islands
  - Béchervaise Island
  - West Budd Island
- Jocelyn Islands
- Nelson Rock
- Rookery Islands
  - Giganteus Island
- Rouse Islands
- Welch Island
- Williams Rocks

== See also ==
- List of Antarctic islands south of 60° S
- Mawson Station
