= Bulgarian toponyms in Antarctica (V) =

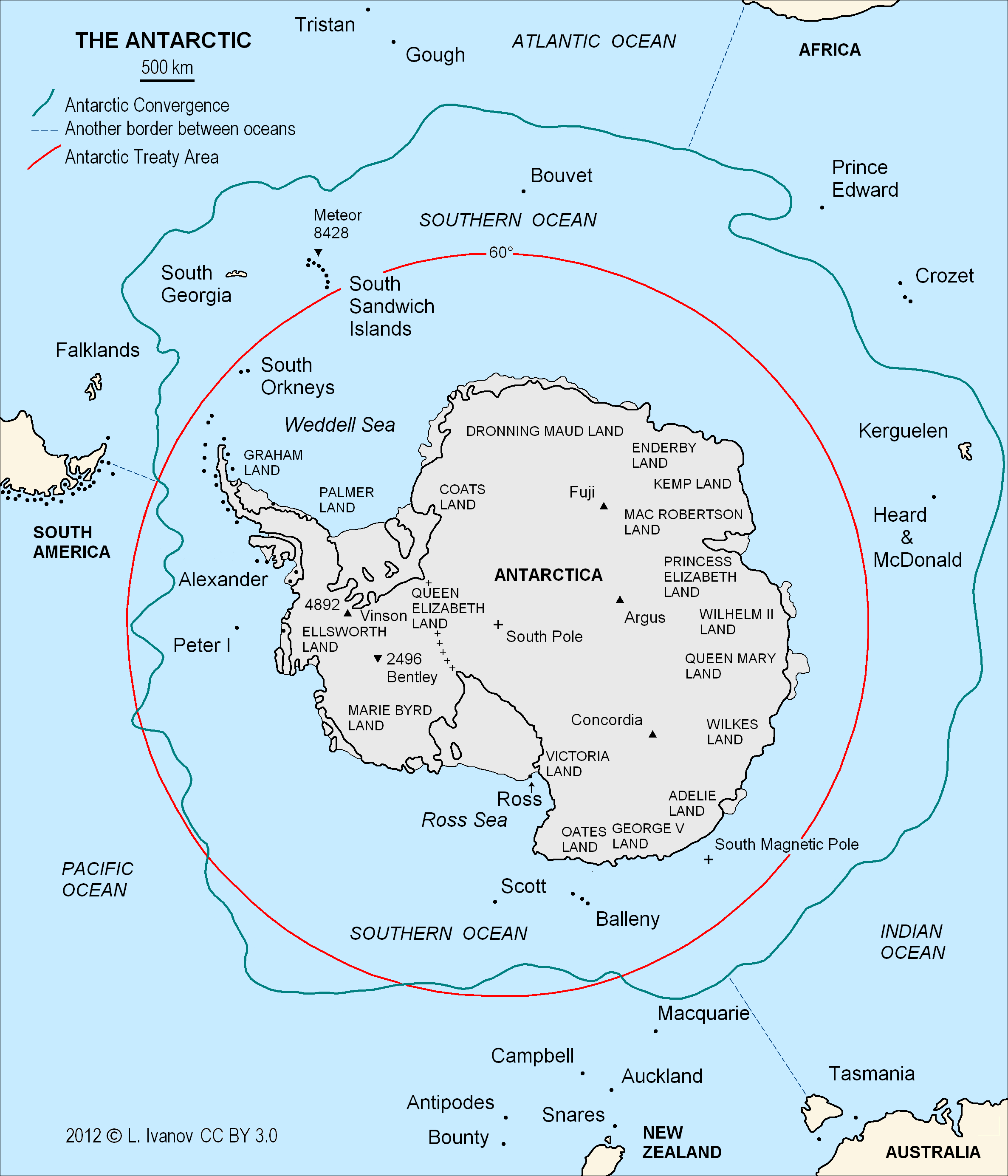
The South Polar Region.

- Vakarel Saddle, Smith Island
- Valchan Peak, Sentinel Range
- Valchedram Island, Livingston Island
- Valchev Cove, Livingston Island
- Valkosel Ridge, Oscar II Coast
- Valoga Glacier, Sentinel Range
- Vanand Peak, Sentinel Range
- Vapa Cove, Liège Island
- Vaptsarov Peak, Livingston Island
- Varad Point, Foyn Coast
- Varbak Point, Smith Island
- Vardim Rocks, Livingston Island
- Vardun Point, Graham Coast
- Varna Peninsula, Livingston Island
- Varshets Saddle, Smith Island
- Vartop Point, Graham Coast
- Varvara Cove, Nelson Island
- Vasilev Bay, Livingston Island
- Vasilev Peak, Smith Island
- Vaskidovich Ridge, Alexander Island
- Vaugondy Island, Biscoe Islands
- Vazharov Peak, Liège Island
- Vazov Point, Livingston Island
- Vazov Rock, Livingston Island
- Vedena Cove, Smith Island
- Vedrare Nunatak, Nordenskjöld Coast
- Velcha Cove, Astrolabe Island
- Veleka Ridge, Livingston Island
- Veles Bastion, Brabant Island
- Velichkov Knoll, Davis Coast
- Velikan Point, Smith Island
- Velingrad Peninsula, Graham Coast
- Venchan Bluff, Brabant Island
- Venev Point, Low Island
- Verdikal Gap, Trinity Peninsula
- Veregava Ridge, Sentinel Range
- Vergilov Ridge, Livingston Island
- Vergilov Rocks, Livingston Island
- Verila Glacier, Livingston Island
- Versinikia Peak, Sentinel Range
- Veselie Glacier, Oscar II Coast
- Veshka Point, Graham Coast
- Vetrilo Rocks, Wilhelm Archipelago
- Vetrino Glacier, Smith Island
- Vetrovala Peak, Trinity Peninsula
- Veyka Point, Two Hummock Island
- Viamata Saddle, Brabant Island
- Vicha Glacier, Sentinel Range
- Vichina Cove, Nelson Island
- Vidbol Glacier, Danco Coast
- Vidin Heights, Livingston Island
- Vidul Glacier, Sentinel Range
- Vihren Peak, Livingston Island
- Vilare Island, Robert Island
- Vineh Peak, Rugged Island
- Vinitsa Cove, Davis Coast
- Vinogradi Peak, Trinity Peninsula
- Vinson Plateau, Vinson Massif
- Vishegrad Knoll, Trinity Peninsula
- Vishna Pass, Oscar II Coast
- Viskyar Ridge, Greenwich Island
- Vit Ice Piedmont, Sentinel Range
- Vitosha Saddle, Livingston Island
- Vladaya Saddle, Livingston Island
- Vladigerov Passage, Biscoe Islands
- Voden Heights, Oscar II Coast
- Vodoley Rock, Livingston Island
- Vokil Point, Snow Island
- Vola Ridge, Alexander Island
- Vologes Ridge, Foyn Coast
- Volov Peak, Davis Coast
- Volturnus Lake, Livingston Island
- Voluyak Rocks, Greenwich Island
- Voysil Peak, Sentinel Range
- Voyteh Point, Livingston Island
- Vrabcha Cove, Robert Island
- Vrachesh Glacier, Nordenskjöld Coast
- Vranya Pass, Sentinel Range
- Vratsa Peak, Greenwich Island
- Vrelo Peak, Oscar II Coast
- Vromos Island, Anvers Island
- Vund Point, Rugged Island

== See also ==
- Bulgarian toponyms in Antarctica

== Bibliography ==
- J. Stewart. Antarctica: An Encyclopedia. Jefferson, N.C. and London: McFarland, 2011. 1771 pp. ISBN 978-0-7864-3590-6
- L. Ivanov. Bulgarian Names in Antarctica. Sofia: Manfred Wörner Foundation, 2021. Second edition. 539 pp. ISBN 978-619-90008-5-4 (in Bulgarian)
- G. Bakardzhieva. Bulgarian toponyms in Antarctica. Paisiy Hilendarski University of Plovdiv: Research Papers. Vol. 56, Book 1, Part A, 2018 – Languages and Literature, pp. 104-119 (in Bulgarian)
- L. Ivanov and N. Ivanova. Bulgarian names. In: The World of Antarctica. Generis Publishing, 2022. pp. 114-115. ISBN 979-8-88676-403-1
