= Oescus Island =

Island in Antarctica

- Location of Robert Island in the South Shetland Islands

- Location within Antarctica Location within Antarctic Peninsula

Geography
- Location: Antarctica
- Coordinates: 62°21′07″S 59°41′15.5″W
- Archipelago: South Shetland Islands

Administration
- Administered under the Antarctic Treaty System

Demographics
- Population: Uninhabited

Oescus Island (Bulgarian: остров Ескус, romanized: ostrov Eskus, IPA: [ˈɔstrof ˈɛskos]) is the low ice-free island in the Onogur group off the northwest coast of Robert Island in the South Shetland Islands, Antarctica extending 380 m in southeast–northwest direction and 40 m wide. The feature comprises two parts connected by a spit, and is separated from Redina Island, Kovach Island and Leeve Island by passages 120 m, 160 m and 130 m wide respectively.

The island is named after the ancient Roman town of Oescus in Northern Bulgaria.

== Location ==
Oescus Island is located at 62°21′07″S 59°41′15.5″W, which is 1.42 km north of Misnomer Point and 890 m west of Shipot Point. British mapping in 1968 and Bulgarian mapping in 2009.

== See also ==
- List of Antarctic and subantarctic islands

== Maps ==
- Livingston Island to King George Island. Scale 1:200000. Admiralty Nautical Chart 1776. Taunton: UK Hydrographic Office, 1968.
- L.L. Ivanov. Antarctica: Livingston Island and Greenwich, Robert, Snow and Smith Islands. Scale 1:120000 topographic map. Troyan: Manfred Wörner Foundation, 2009. ISBN 978-954-92032-6-4 (Second edition 2010, ISBN 978-954-92032-9-5)
- Antarctic Digital Database (ADD). Scale 1:250000 topographic map of Antarctica. Scientific Committee on Antarctic Research (SCAR). Since 1993, regularly upgraded and updated.
