= Bikorn Lake =

Antarctic lake

- езеро Бикорна (Bulgarian)
- Location within South Shetland Islands
- Interactive map of Bikorn Lake
- Topographic map of Livingston, Greenwich, Robert, Snow and Smith Islands
- Location: Treklyano Island, South Shetland Islands
- Coordinates: 62°22′05″S 59°24′31.5″W
- Type: Lake
- Basin countries: Antarctica
- Max. length: 205 metres (673 ft)
- Max. width: 137 metres (449 ft)
- Surface area: 1.46 hectares (3.6 acres)
- Surface elevation: 791 metres (2,595 ft)

Bikorn Lake (Bulgarian: езеро Бикорна, romanized: ezero Bikorna, IPA: ['ɛzɛro bi'kɔrnɐ]) is the lake occupying most of the interior of Treklyano Island off the northeast coast of Robert Island in the South Shetland Islands, Antarctica. It extends 205 metres (673 ft) in west-northwest to east-southeast direction and 137 metres (449 ft) in south–north direction, with a surface area of 1.46 hectares (3.6 acres), and is separated from the waters of Nelson Strait by a 21 to 70 metres (69 to 230 ft) wide strip of land. The area was visited by early 19th century sealers.

The feature is so named because of its shape supposedly resembling a bicorne hat ('bikorn' in Bulgarian).

== Location ==
Location of Robert Island in the South Shetland Islands

Bikorn Lake is centred 3.18 km (1.98 mi) east of Ugarchin Point and 1.58 km (0.98 mi) west of Smirnenski Point. British mapping of the area in 1968 and Bulgarian in 2009.

== Maps ==
- Livingston Island to King George Island. Scale 1:200000. Admiralty Nautical Chart 1776. Taunton: UK Hydrographic Office, 1968
- South Shetland Islands. Scale 1:200000 topographic map No. 3373. DOS 610 - W 62 58. Tolworth, UK, 1968
- L.L. Ivanov. Antarctica: Livingston Island and Greenwich, Robert, Snow and Smith Islands. Scale 1:120000 topographic map. Troyan: Manfred Wörner Foundation, 2009. ISBN 978-954-92032-6-4
- Antarctic Digital Database (ADD). Scale 1:250000 topographic map of Antarctica. Scientific Committee on Antarctic Research (SCAR). Since 1993, regularly upgraded and updated
