= Milev Rocks =

Islands in the South Shetland Islands

- Location of Robert Island in the South Shetland Islands

- Location within Antarctica Location within Antarctic Peninsula

Geography
- Location: Antarctica
- Coordinates: 62°18′46″S 59°32′54″W
- Archipelago: South Shetland Islands

Administration
- Administered under the Antarctic Treaty System

Demographics
- Population: Uninhabited

Milev Rocks (Bulgarian: Милеви скали, ‘Milevi Skali’ \'mi-le-vi ska-'li\) is the group of rocks off the north coast of Robert Island in the South Shetland Islands, Antarctica, situated east of Henfield Rock, south-southwest of Orsoya Rocks and southwest of Mellona Rocks, and extending 1.5 km (0.93 mi) in east-west direction and 600 m (656 yd) in north-south direction.

The rocks are named after the Bulgarian poet Geo Milev (pseudonym of Georgi Milyov Kasabov, 1895–1925).

== Location ==
Milev Rocks are centred at 62°18′46″S 59°32′54″W, which is 3.06 km (1.90 mi) north-northwest of Newell Point. British mapping in 1968 and Bulgarian in 2009.

== See also ==
- Composite Antarctic Gazetteer
- List of Antarctic and sub-Antarctic islands
- List of Antarctic islands south of 60° S
- SCAR
- Territorial claims in Antarctica

== Maps ==
- L.L. Ivanov. Antarctica: Livingston Island and Greenwich, Robert, Snow and Smith Islands. Scale 1:120000 topographic map. Troyan: Manfred Wörner Foundation, 2009. ISBN 978-954-92032-6-4
