= Izgrev Passage =

Strait in the South Shetland Islands

Location of Robert Island in the South Shetland Islands.

Topographic map of Livingston Island, Greenwich, Robert, Snow and Smith Islands.

Izgrev Passage (Bulgarian: проток Изгрев, ‘Protok Izgrev’ \'pro-tok 'iz-grev\) is the 2.3 km wide passage separating Rogozen Island, Heywood Island and Pordim Islands from Cornwall Island, Onogur Islands and the northwest coast of Robert Island in the South Shetland Islands. The area was visited by early 19th century sealers.

The passage is named after the settlements of Izgrev in Northern, Northeastern, Southeastern and Southwestern Bulgaria.

== Location ==
Izgrev Passage is located at 62°20′10″S 59°40′30″W. British mapping in 1968 and Bulgarian mapping in 2009.

== Maps ==
- Livingston Island to King George Island. Scale 1:200000. Admiralty Nautical Chart 1776. Taunton: UK Hydrographic Office, 1968.
- L.L. Ivanov. Antarctica: Livingston Island and Greenwich, Robert, Snow and Smith Islands. Scale 1:120000 topographic map. Troyan: Manfred Wörner Foundation, 2009. ISBN 978-954-92032-6-4 (Second edition 2010, ISBN 978-954-92032-9-5)
- Antarctic Digital Database (ADD). Scale 1:250000 topographic map of Antarctica. Scientific Committee on Antarctic Research (SCAR). Since 1993, regularly upgraded and updated.
- L.L. Ivanov. Antarctica: Livingston Island and Smith Island. Scale 1:100000 topographic map. Manfred Wörner Foundation, 2017. ISBN 978-619-90008-3-0
