= Orsoya Rocks =

Islands in the South Shetland Islands

- Location of Robert Islands in the South Shetland Islands

- Location within Antarctica Location within Antarctic Peninsula

Geography
- Location: Antarctica
- Coordinates: 62°17′39″S 59°31′32″W

Administration
- Administered under the Antarctic Treaty System

Demographics
- Population: Uninhabited

Orsoya Rocks (Bulgarian: скали Орсоя, ‘Skali Orsoya’ \ska-'li or-'so-ya\) is the group of rocks off the north coast of Robert Island in the South Shetland Islands, Antarctica, situated west-northwest of Mellona Rocks, north-northeast of Milev Rocks and east-northeast of Opaka Rocks, and extending 650 m in northwest-southeast direction and 500 m in northeast-southwest direction.

The rocks are named after the settlement of Orsoya in Northwestern Bulgaria.

== Location ==
Orsoya Rocks are centred at 62°17′39″S 59°31′32″W, which is 4.78 km north of Newell Point. British mapping in 1968 and Bulgarian in 2009.

== See also ==
- List of Antarctic and sub-Antarctic islands
- South Shetland Islands

== Maps ==
- South Shetland Islands. Scale 1:200000 topographic map. DOS 610 Series, Sheet W 62 58. Directorate of Overseas Surveys, Directorate of Overseas Surveys, Tolworth, UK, 1968.
- Antarctic Digital Database (ADD). Scale 1:250000 topographic map of Antarctica. Scientific Committee on Antarctic Research (SCAR). Since 1993, regularly upgraded and updated.
