= Kovach Island =

Island in the South Shetland Islands, Antarctica

- Location of Robert Island in the South Shetland Islands

- Location within Antarctica Location within Antarctic Peninsula

Geography
- Location: Antarctica
- Coordinates: 62°21′09″S 59°41′39″W
- Archipelago: South Shetland Islands

Administration
- Administered under the Antarctic Treaty System

Demographics
- Population: Uninhabited

Kovach Island (Bulgarian: остров Ковач, romanized: ostrov Kovach, IPA: [ˈɔstrof koˈvat͡ʃ]) is the westernmost island in the Onogur group off the northwest coast of Robert Island in the South Shetland Islands, Antarctica. The feature is rocky, extending 630 m in southwest-northeast direction and 240 m wide. It is separated from Grod Island by a 100 m wide passage. The area was visited by early 19th century sealers.

The island is named after the settlement of Kovach in Southern Bulgaria.

== Location ==
Kovach Island is located 1.17 km north of Misnomer Point, 760 m southeast of Cornwall Island and 1.08 km west of Shipot Point. British mapping in 1968 and Bulgarian mapping in 2009.

== Maps ==
- Livingston Island to King George Island. Scale 1:200000. Admiralty Nautical Chart 1776. Taunton: UK Hydrographic Office, 1968.
- L.L. Ivanov. Antarctica: Livingston Island and Greenwich, Robert, Snow and Smith Islands. Scale 1:120000 topographic map. Troyan: Manfred Wörner Foundation, 2009. ISBN 978-954-92032-6-4 (Second edition 2010, ISBN 978-954-92032-9-5)
- Antarctic Digital Database (ADD). Scale 1:250000 topographic map of Antarctica. Scientific Committee on Antarctic Research (SCAR). Since 1993, regularly upgraded and updated.
