= Graovo Rocks =

Islands in the South Shetland Islands

- Location of Robert Island in the South Shetland Islands.

- Location within Antarctica Location within Antarctic Peninsula

Geography
- Location: Antarctica
- Coordinates: 62°19′31″S 59°30′22″W
- Archipelago: South Shetland Islands

Administration
- Administered under the Antarctic Treaty System

Demographics
- Population: Uninhabited

Graovo Rocks is the group of rocks off the north coast of Robert Island in the South Shetland Islands, Antarctica. They are situated east of Lientur Rocks and southwest of Liberty Rocks, and extend 1.75 km (1.09 mi) in north–south direction and 750 m (820 yd) in east–west direction.

The rocks are named after the Graovo region in western Bulgaria.

== Location ==
Graovo Rocks are centred at 62°19′31″S 59°30′22″W, which is 1.51 km (0.94 mi) north-northeast of Newell Point. British mapping in 1968 and Bulgarian in 2009.

== See also ==
- Composite Antarctic Gazetteer
- List of Antarctic and sub-Antarctic islands
- List of Antarctic islands south of 60° S
- SCAR
- Territorial claims in Antarctica

== Maps ==
- L.L. Ivanov. Antarctica: Livingston Island and Greenwich, Robert, Snow and Smith Islands. Scale 1:120000 topographic map. Troyan: Manfred Wörner Foundation, 2009. ISBN 978-954-92032-6-4
