= Priboy Rocks =

Rocks in the South Shetland Islands, Antarctica

- Location of Robert Island in the South Shetland Islands

- Location on Antarctic Peninsula Location in Antarctica

Geography
- Location: Antarctica
- Coordinates: 62°22′05″S 59°21′50″W
- Archipelago: South Shetland Islands

Administration
- Antarctica
- Administered under the Antarctic Treaty System

Demographics
- Population: uninhabited

Priboy Rocks (Bulgarian: скали Прибой, ‘Skali Priboy’ \ska-'li pri-'boy\) is the group of rocks off the east coast of Robert Island in the South Shetland Islands, Antarctica, extending 1.65 km (1.03 mi) in east–west direction and 1.2 km (0.75 mi) in north–south direction.

The rocks are named after the settlement of Priboy in Western Bulgaria.

== Location ==
Priboy Rocks are centred at 62°22′05″S 59°21′50″W, which is 750 m (820 yd) east of Smirnenski Point, 1.45 km (0.90 mi) south-southwest of Salient Rock and 850 m (930 yd) north of Perelik Point. British mapping in 1968 and Bulgarian in 2009.

Topographic map of Livingston Island, Greenwich, Robert, Snow and Smith Islands

== See also ==
- Composite Antarctic Gazetteer
- List of Antarctic and sub-Antarctic islands
- List of Antarctic islands south of 60° S
- SCAR
- Territorial claims in Antarctica
- South Shetland Islands

== Map ==
- L.L. Ivanov. Antarctica: Livingston Island and Greenwich, Robert, Snow and Smith Islands. Scale 1:120000 topographic map. Troyan: Manfred Wörner Foundation, 2009. ISBN 978-954-92032-6-4
