= Leeve Island =

Island in the South Shetland Islands, Antarctica

- Location of Robert Island in the South Shetland Islands

- Location within Antarctica Location within Antarctic Peninsula

Geography
- Location: Antarctica
- Coordinates: 62°21′10″S 59°40′58.5″W
- Archipelago: South Shetland Islands

Administration
- Administered under the Antarctic Treaty System

Demographics
- Population: Uninhabited

Leeve Island (Bulgarian: остров Лееве, romanized: ostrov Leeve, IPA: [ˈɔstrof ˈlɛɛvɛ]) is the low ice-free island in the Onogur group off the northwest coast of Robert Island in the South Shetland Islands, Antarctica extending 200 m in southeast-northwest direction and 80 m wide. It is separated from Redina Island by a 100 m wide passage.

The island is named after Leeve River in Rila Mountain, Bulgaria.

== Location ==
Leeve Island is located 1.46 km to the north of Misnomer Point and 640 m west-southwest of Shipot Point. Bulgarian mapping in 2009.

== Maps ==
- Livingston Island to King George Island. Scale 1:200000. Admiralty Nautical Chart 1776. Taunton: UK Hydrographic Office, 1968.
- L.L. Ivanov. Antarctica: Livingston Island and Greenwich, Robert, Snow and Smith Islands. Scale 1:120000 topographic map. Troyan: Manfred Wörner Foundation, 2009. ISBN 978-954-92032-6-4 (Second edition 2010, ISBN 978-954-92032-9-5)
- Antarctic Digital Database (ADD). Scale 1:250000 topographic map of Antarctica. Scientific Committee on Antarctic Research (SCAR). Since 1993, regularly upgraded and updated.
