= Potmess Rocks =

Group of large rocks in the South Shetland Islands, Antarctica

- Location of Robert Island in the South Shetland Islands

- Location within Antarctic Peninsula Location within Antarctica

Geography
- Location: Antarctica
- Coordinates: 62°19′07″S 59°45′16″W
- Archipelago: South Shetland Islands

Administration
- Antarctica
- Administered under the Antarctic Treaty System

Demographics
- Population: uninhabited

Potmess Rocks is a group of large rocks lying northwest of Robert Island in the South Shetland Islands, Antarctica. The group is extending 1.3 by 1 km (0.81 by 0.62 mi), featuring the conspicuous rocks named Asses Ears in the north. The area was visited by early 19th century sealers operating from nearby Clothier Harbour.

The feature's name derived from the midday stew served on the launch Nimrod during the Royal Navy hydrographic survey of the rocks in 1967.

== Location ==
The rocks are centred at 62°19′07″S 59°45′16″W which is 3 km (1.86 mi) west of Heywood Island, 2.9 km (1.80 mi) northwest of Rogozen Island, 6.06 km (3.77 mi) north-northwest of Fort William and 3.28 km (2.04 mi) northeast of Table Island (British mapping in 1822, 1935 and 1968, Argentine in 1948, 1953 and 1980, Chilean in 1948 and 1971, and Bulgarian in 2009).

== See also ==
- List of Antarctic and sub-Antarctic islands
- South Shetland Islands

== Maps ==
- Chart of South Shetland including Coronation Island, &c. from the exploration of the sloop Dove in the years 1821 and 1822 by George Powell Commander of the same. Scale ca. 1:200000. London: Laurie, 1822.
- L.L. Ivanov. Antarctica: Livingston Island and Greenwich, Robert, Snow and Smith Islands. Scale 1:120000 topographic map. Troyan: Manfred Wörner Foundation, 2009. ISBN 978-954-92032-6-4
