= Lientur Rocks =

Rocks in the South Shetland Islands, Antarctica

- Location of Robert Island in the South Shetland Islands

- Location on Antarctic Peninsula Location in Antarctica

Geography
- Location: Antarctica
- Coordinates: 62°19′36″S 59°31′55″W
- Archipelago: South Shetland Islands

Administration
- Administered under the Antarctic Treaty System

Demographics
- Population: Uninhabited

Lientur Rocks is a group of prominent adjacent rocks lying off the north coast of Robert Island in the South Shetland Islands, Antarctica and extending 660 m (722 yd) in east–west direction and 320 m (350 yd) in north–south direction. The area was visited by early 19th-century sealers operating from nearby Clothier Harbour.

The feature was named by the 1949-50 Chilean Antarctic Expedition after the expedition patrol ship Lientur.

== Location ==
The rocks are centred at 62°19′36″S 59°31′55″W which is 1.26 km (0.78 mi) north-northwest of Newell Point, 710 m (776 yd) north-northeast of Tatul Island, 3.12 km (1.94 mi) southeast of Henfield Rock, 3.41 km (2.12 mi) southwest of Mellona Rocks and 3.74 km (2.32 mi) west-southwest of Liberty Rocks (British mapping in 1968, Chilean in 1971, Argentine in 1980, and Bulgarian in 2009).

Topographic map of Livingston Island, Greenwich, Robert, Snow and Smith Islands

== See also ==
- Composite Antarctic Gazetteer
- List of Antarctic islands south of 60° S
- SCAR
- Territorial claims in Antarctica

== Maps ==
- L.L. Ivanov. Antarctica: Livingston Island and Greenwich, Robert, Snow and Smith Islands. Scale 1:120000 topographic map. Troyan: Manfred Wörner Foundation, 2009. ISBN 978-954-92032-6-4
