= Svetulka Island =

Island in Antarctica

- Location of Robert Island in the South Shetland Islands

- Location within Antarctica Location within Antarctic Peninsula

Geography
- Location: Antarctica
- Coordinates: 62°20′49.7″S 59°40′45.8″W
- Archipelago: South Shetland Islands

Administration
- Antarctica
- Administered under the Antarctic Treaty System

Demographics
- Population: 0

Svetulka Island (Bulgarian: остров Светулка, romanized: ostrov Svetulka, IPA: [ˈɔstrof svɛˈtuɫkɐ]) is the northernmost island in the Onogur group off the northwest coast of Robert Island in the South Shetland Islands, Antarctica. The feature is rocky, extending 150 by 90 metres (490 by 300 ft), and separated from Osenovlag Island by a 20-metre (66 ft) wide passage. The area was visited by early 19th century sealers.

The island is named after the settlement of Svetulka in Southern Bulgaria.

== Location ==
Svetulka Island is located at 62°20′49.7″S 59°40′45.8″W, which is 520 metres (1,710 ft) northwest of Shipot Point, 1.3 kilometres (0.81 mi) east-southeast of Cornwall Island and 1.74 kilometres (1.08 mi) southeast of Rogozen Island. Measurements are based on British mapping in 1968 and Bulgarian mapping in 2009.

== See also ==
- List of Antarctic and subantarctic islands

== Maps ==
- Livingston Island to King George Island. Scale 1:200000. Admiralty Nautical Chart 1776. Taunton: UK Hydrographic Office, 1968.
- L.L. Ivanov. Antarctica: Livingston Island and Greenwich, Robert, Snow and Smith Islands. Scale 1:120000 topographic map. Troyan: Manfred Wörner Foundation, 2009. ISBN 978-954-92032-6-4 (Second edition 2010, ISBN 978-954-92032-9-5)
- Antarctic Digital Database (ADD). Scale 1:250000 topographic map of Antarctica. Scientific Committee on Antarctic Research (SCAR). Since 1993, regularly upgraded and updated.
