= Boatin Island =

Island in the South Shetland Islands

- Location of Robert Island in the South Shetland Islands

- Location within Antarctic Peninsula Location within Antarctica

Geography
- Location: Antarctica
- Coordinates: 62°20′32.7″S 59°38′55″W
- Archipelago: South Shetland Islands

Administration
- Administered under the Antarctic Treaty System

Demographics
- Population: Uninhabited

Boatin Island (Bulgarian: остров Боатин, romanized: ostrov Boatin, IPA: [ˈɔstrov boɐˈtin]) is the rocky island off the northwest coast of Robert Island in the South Shetland Islands extending 740 m in north–south direction and 150 m wide. It ends in the T-shaped 250 m wide Hammer Point to the north, and connected to Robert Island to the south by a 250 m long moraine tombolo. The feature was formed as a result of the retreat of Robert Island's ice cap during the first decade of 21st century. The area was visited by early 19th century sealers.

== Location ==
Boatin Island lies between Clothier Harbour and Nevestino Cove at 62°20′32.7″S 59°38′55″W.

== Maps ==
- Livingston Island to King George Island. Scale 1:200000. Admiralty Nautical Chart 1776. Taunton: UK Hydrographic Office, 1968.
- L.L. Ivanov. Antarctica: Livingston Island and Greenwich, Robert, Snow and Smith Islands. Scale 1:120000 topographic map. Troyan: Manfred Wörner Foundation, 2009. ISBN 978-954-92032-6-4 (Second edition 2010, ISBN 978-954-92032-9-5)
- Antarctic Digital Database (ADD). Scale 1:250000 topographic map of Antarctica. Scientific Committee on Antarctic Research (SCAR). Since 1993, regularly upgraded and updated.
