= Henfield Rock =

Offshore rock in Antarctica

- Location of Robert Island in the South Shetland Islands

- Location within Antarctic Peninsula Location within Antarctica

Geography
- Location: Antarctica
- Coordinates: 62°18′45.8″S 59°35′03.3″W
- Archipelago: South Shetland Islands

Administration
- Administered under the Antarctic Treaty System

Demographics
- Population: Uninhabited

Henfield Rock is an offshore rock lying northwest of Robert Island in the South Shetland Islands, Antarctica. It was known to the early 19th century sealers operating from nearby Clothier Harbour, and sometimes included under the name 'Powels Islands' or 'Heywood Islands'.

The feature is named after Captain Joseph Henfield, Master of the American sealing vessel Catharina that visited the South Shetlands in 1820–21.

== Location ==
The rock is located 2.53 km (1.57 mi) northeast of Catharina Point, 5 km (3.11 mi) east of Heywood Island, 700 m (766 yd) south of Opaka Rocks and 2.81 km (1.75 mi) northwest of Lientur Rocks (British mapping in 1822 and 1968, Chilean in 1971, Argentine in 1980, and Bulgarian in 2009).

== See also ==
- Composite Antarctic Gazetteer
- List of Antarctic islands south of 60° S
- SCAR
- Territorial claims in Antarctica

== Maps ==
- Chart of South Shetland including Coronation Island, &c. from the exploration of the sloop Dove in the years 1821 and 1822 by George Powell Commander of the same. Scale ca. 1:200000. London: Laurie, 1822.
- L.L. Ivanov. Antarctica: Livingston Island and Greenwich, Robert, Snow and Smith Islands. Scale 1:120000 topographic map. Troyan: Manfred Wörner Foundation, 2009. ISBN 978-954-92032-6-4
