= Vilare Island =

Island in the Onogur group, Antarctica

- Location of Robert Island in the South Shetland Islands

- Location within Antarctica Location within Antarctic Peninsula

Geography
- Location: Antarctica
- Coordinates: 62°21′06.5″S 59°40′35″W
- Archipelago: South Shetland Islands

Administration
- Antarctica
- Administered under the Antarctic Treaty System

Demographics
- Population: uninhabited

Vilare Island (Bulgarian: остров Виларе, romanized: ostrov Vilare, IPA: [ˈɔstrov viˈɫarɛ]) is the low ice-free island in the Onogur group off the northwest coast of Robert Island in the South Shetland Islands, Antarctica extending 130 m in east-west direction and 60 m wide. It is separated from Churicheni Island by a 20 m wide passage.

The feature is named after the settlement of Vilare in Northern Bulgaria.

== Location ==
Vilare Island is located at 62°21′06.5″S 59°40′35″W, which is 1.7 km north-northeast of Misnomer Point and 290 m west-southwest of Shipot Point. Bulgarian mapping in 2009.

== See also ==
- List of Antarctic and subantarctic islands

== Maps ==
- Livingston Island to King George Island. Scale 1:200000. Admiralty Nautical Chart 1776. Taunton: UK Hydrographic Office, 1968.
- L.L. Ivanov. Antarctica: Livingston Island and Greenwich, Robert, Snow and Smith Islands. Scale 1:120000 topographic map. Troyan: Manfred Wörner Foundation, 2009. ISBN 978-954-92032-6-4 (Second edition 2010, ISBN 978-954-92032-9-5)
- Antarctic Digital Database (ADD). Scale 1:250000 topographic map of Antarctica. Scientific Committee on Antarctic Research (SCAR). Since 1993, regularly upgraded and updated.
