= Opaka (disambiguation) =

Opaka is a town in Bulɡaria.

Opaka may also refer to:

- Opaka Municipality, a Bulgarian municipality
- Opaka, Poland, a village in Poland
- Opaka, Ukraine, a village in Ukraine
- Opaka Sulan, a fictional character from Star Trek: Deep Space Nine
