= Lavrenov Point =

Coordinates: 62°20′14″S 59°34′26″W

Location of Robert Island in the South Shetland Islands.

Topographic map of Livingston Island, Greenwich, Robert, Snow and Smith Islands.

Lavrenov Point (Bulgarian: Лавренов нос, ‘Lavrenov Nos’ \la-'vre-nov 'nos\) is a point on the north coast of Robert Island, South Shetland Islands forming the east side of the entrance to Yundola Cove. Situated 2.7 km west of Newell Point and 2.6 km southeast of Catharina Point. Bulgarian early mapping in 2008. Named after the Bulgarian painter Tsanko Lavrenov (1896–1978).

== Map ==
- L.L. Ivanov. Antarctica: Livingston Island and Greenwich, Robert, Snow and Smith Islands. Scale 1:120000 topographic map. Troyan: Manfred Wörner Foundation, 2009. ISBN 978-954-92032-6-4
- Antarctic Digital Database (ADD). Scale 1:250000 topographic map of Antarctica. Scientific Committee on Antarctic Research (SCAR). Since 1993, regularly upgraded and updated.
