= Churicheni Island =

Island in Antarctica

- Location of Robert Island in the Shetland Islands

- Location within Antarctic Peninsula Location within Antarctica

Geography
- Location: Antarctica
- Coordinates: 62°21′02.5″S 59°40′33″W
- Archipelago: South Shetland Islands

Administration
- Antarctica
- Administered under the Antarctic Treaty System

Demographics
- Population: 0

Churicheni Island (Bulgarian: остров Чуричени, romanized: ostrov Churicheni, IPA: [ˈɔstrof t͡ʃoˈrit͡ʃɛni]) is the ice-free island in the Onogur group off the northwest coast of Robert Island in the South Shetland Islands, Antarctica extending 230 m by 140 m. It is separated from Robert Island by a 100 m wide passage.

The feature is named after the settlement of Churicheni in Southwestern Bulgaria.

== Location ==
Churicheni Island is located at 62°21′02.5″S 59°40′33″W, which is 1.78 km north-northeast of Misnomer Point and 190 m west of Shipot Point. British mapping in 1968 and Bulgarian mapping in 2009.

== Maps ==
- Livingston Island to King George Island. Scale 1:200000. Admiralty Nautical Chart 1776. Taunton: UK Hydrographic Office, 1968.
- L.L. Ivanov. Antarctica: Livingston Island and Greenwich, Robert, Snow and Smith Islands. Scale 1:120000 topographic map. Troyan: Manfred Wörner Foundation, 2009. ISBN 978-954-92032-6-4 (Second edition 2010, ISBN 978-954-92032-9-5)
- Antarctic Digital Database (ADD). Scale 1:250000 topographic map of Antarctica. Scientific Committee on Antarctic Research (SCAR). Since 1993, regularly upgraded and updated.
