= Asses Ears =

Asses' Ears or Asses Ears might refer to:

- Asses Ears (Alaska), a mountain in the United States
- Asses Ears (South Shetland Islands) near Antarctica
- Asses Ears (China) near Guangdong, China
