= Vrabcha =

Vrabcha Врабча
- Village
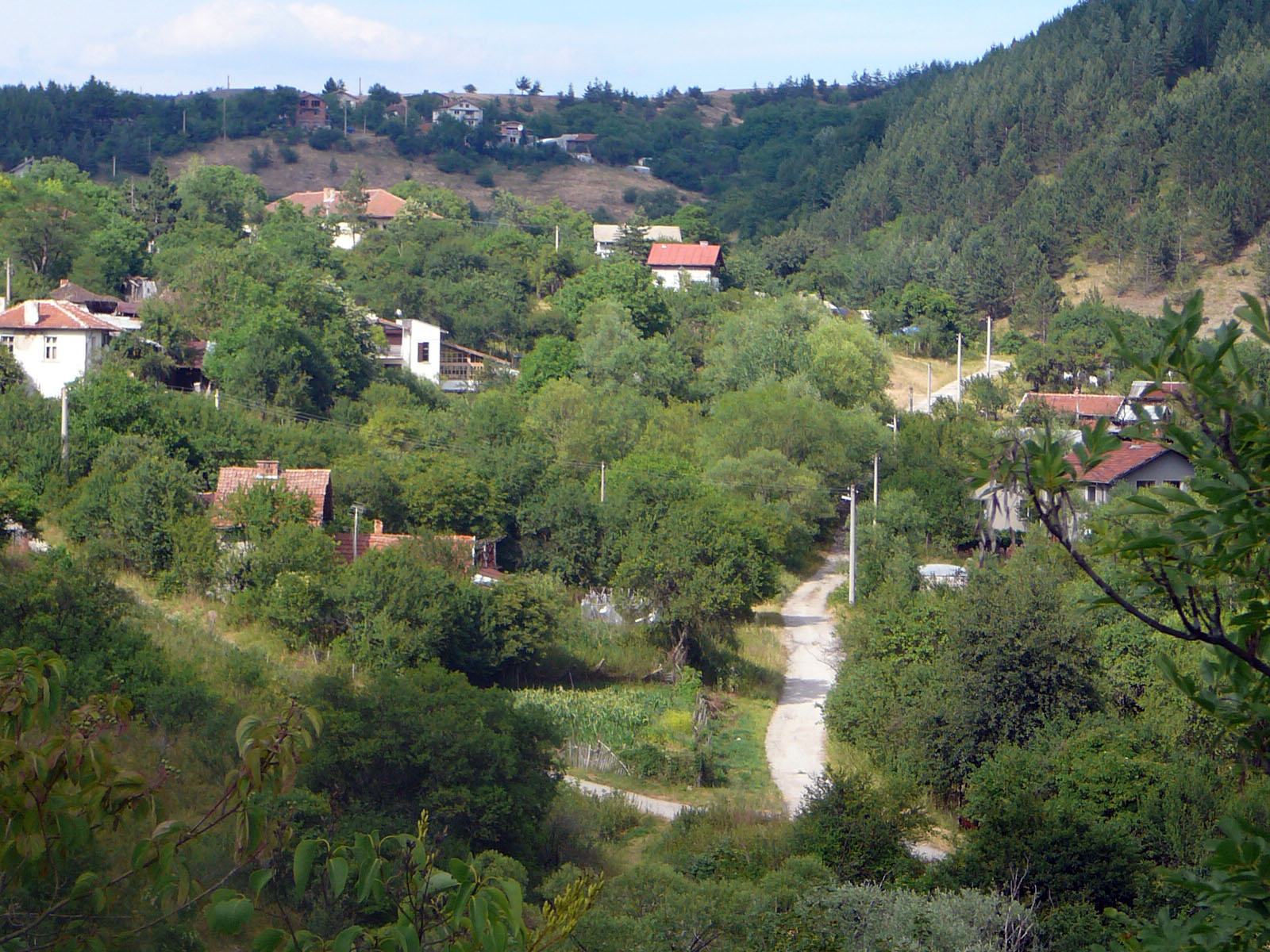

- Location of Vrabcha
- Coordinates: 42°52′0″N 22°42′24″E
- Country: Bulgaria
- Provinces (Oblast): Pernik

Government
  - Mayor: Stanislav Nikolov
- Elevation: 883 m (2,897 ft)

Population (2008)
  - Total: 51
- Time zone: UTC+2 (EET)
  - Summer (DST): UTC+3 (EEST)
- Postal Code: 2470
- Area code: 07733
- License plate: PK

Vrabcha (Bulgarian: Врабча) is a small divided village in Tran Municipality, Pernik Province. It is located in western Bulgaria, 70 km from the capital city of Sofia and 10 km from the town of Tran. The village was first mentioned in 1453 as Vrabets (Virabeç); its name is derived from the Bulgarian word for cock sparrow, vrabets (врабец). Vrabcha is bisected by the Bulgarian-Serbian border, its Serbian part is called Vrapča (Врапча) and lies in Dimitrovgrad municipality, Pirot District.

Vrabcha Cove in Heywood Island off Robert Island in the South Shetland Islands, Antarctica is named after Vrabcha.

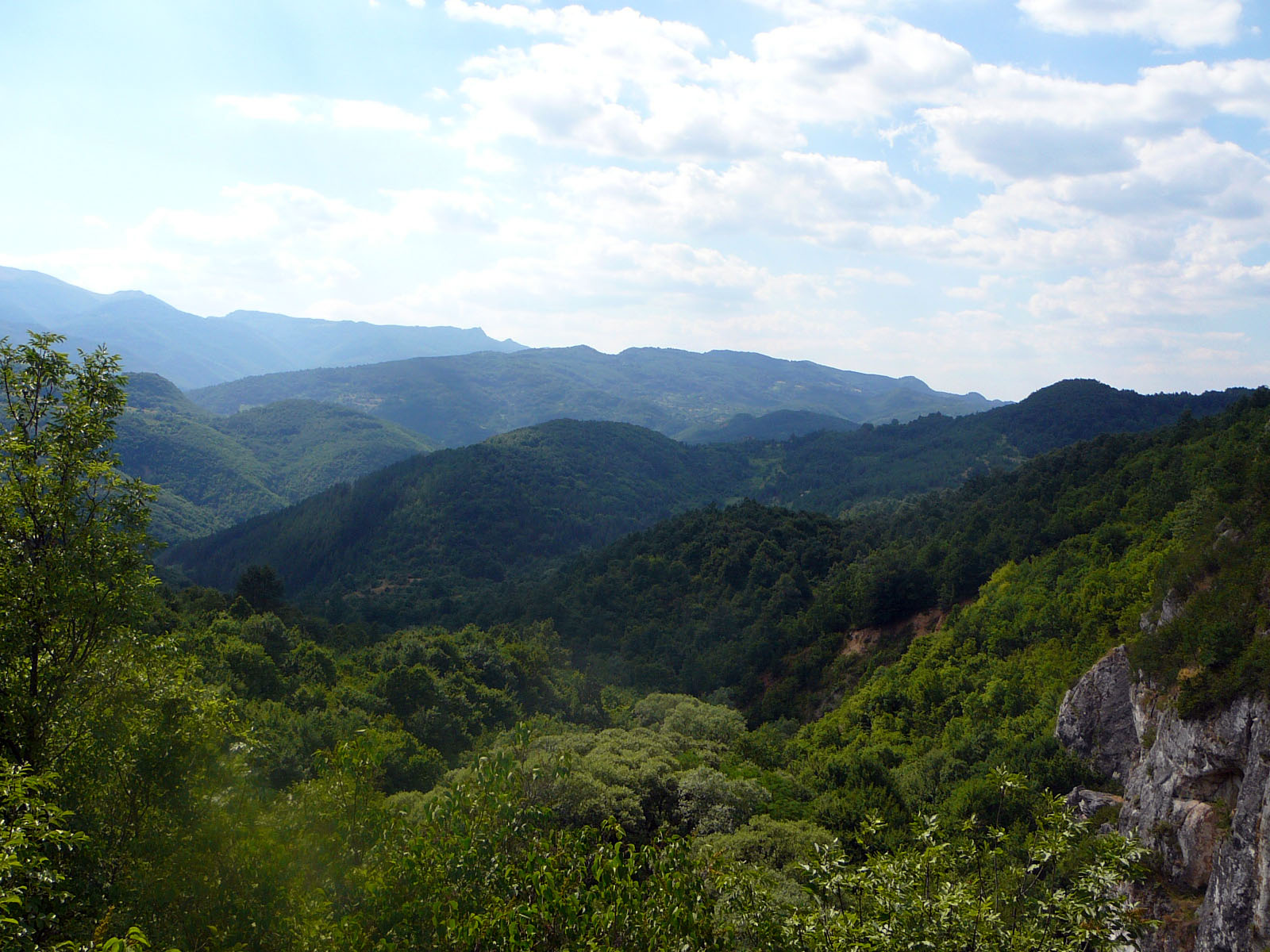
