= Grod Island =

Island in the South Shetland Islands, Antarctica

- Location of Robert Island in the South Shetland Islands.

- Location within Antarctica Location within Antarctic Peninsula

Geography
- Location: Antarctica
- Coordinates: 62°21′27″S 59°41′22″W
- Archipelago: South Shetland Islands

Administration
- Administered under the Antarctic Treaty System

Demographics
- Population: Uninhabited

Grod Island (Bulgarian: остров Грод, romanized: ostrov Grod, IPA: [ˈɔstrov ˈɡrɔt]) is the southernmost island in the Onogur group off the northwest coast of Robert Island in the South Shetland Islands, Antarctica. The feature is low and ice-free, extending 610 m in east–west direction and 200 m wide. It is separated from Robert Island by a 130 m wide passage.

The island is named after the Bulgar ruler Grod (6th century).

== Location ==
Grod Island is located 810 m north of Misnomer Point and 940 m southwest of Shipot Point. British mapping in 1968 and Bulgarian mapping in 2009.

== Maps ==
- Livingston Island to King George Island. Scale 1:200000. Admiralty Nautical Chart 1776. Taunton: UK Hydrographic Office, 1968.
- L.L. Ivanov. Antarctica: Livingston Island and Greenwich, Robert, Snow and Smith Islands. Scale 1:120000 topographic map. Troyan: Manfred Wörner Foundation, 2009. ISBN 978-954-92032-6-4 (Second edition 2010, ISBN 978-954-92032-9-5)
- Antarctic Digital Database (ADD). Scale 1:250000 topographic map of Antarctica. Scientific Committee on Antarctic Research (SCAR). Since 1993, regularly upgraded and updated.
