= Parry Patch =

Shoal in South Shetland Islands, Antarctica

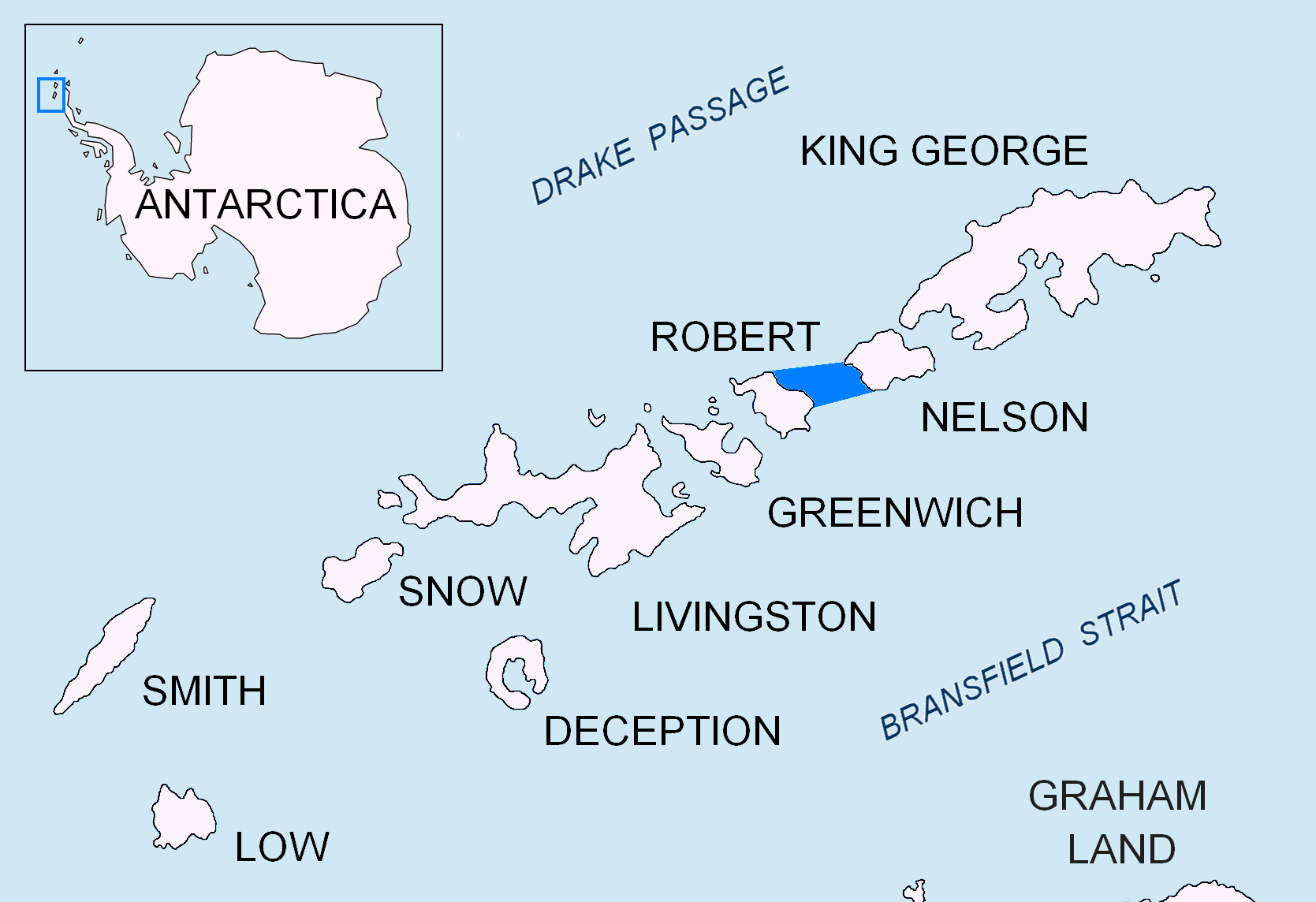
Location of Nelson Strait in the South Shetland Islands.

Parry Patch (62°17′S 59°22′W) is a shoal lying in Nelson Strait 3 nautical miles (6 km) northwest of Harmony Point, Nelson Island, in the South Shetland Islands. The name Parry's Straits or Perry's Straits was applied to Nelson Strait by the British sealer Richard Sherratt in 1820–21, but the name did not become established. Parry Patch was applied by the United Kingdom Antarctic Place-Names Committee (UK-APC) in 1961 to preserve Sherratt's name in the area.
