= Izgrev =

Izgrev may refer to:

- Izgrev, Sofia - one of the 24 districts in Sofia Municipality in the Sofia City Province, Bulgaria
- One of eight villages in Bulgaria:
  1. Izgrev, Blagoevgrad Province - in the Blagoevgrad municipality of the Blagoevgrad Province
  2. Izgrev, Burgas Province - in the Tsarevo municipality of the Burgas Province
  3. Izgrev, Pleven Province - in the Levski municipality of the Pleven Province
  4. Izgrev, Sliven Province - in the Sliven municipality of the Sliven Province
  5. Izgrev, Smolyan Province - in the Nedelino municipality of the Smolyan Province
  6. Izgrev, Shumen Province - in the Venets municipality of the Shumen Province
  7. Izgrev, Varna Province - in the Suvorovo municipality of the Varna Province
  8. Izgrev, Yambol Province - in the Elhovo municipality of the Yambol Province
