= Nevestino =

Nevestino (Bulgarian: Невестино) may refer to several villages in Bulgaria:

- Nevestino, Burgas Province
- Nevestino, Kardzhali Province
- Nevestino, Kyustendil Province – the administrative centre of Nevestino municipality

== See also ==
- Nevestino Cove, Antarctica, named after such villages
