= Ugarchin Point =

Location of Robert Island in the South Shetland Islands.

Topographic map of Livingston Island, Greenwich, Robert, Snow and Smith Islands.

Ugarchin Point (Bulgarian: нос Угърчин, ‘Nos Ugarchin’ \'nos u-g&r-'chin\) is a point on the northeast coast of Robert Island in the South Shetland Islands, Antarctica projecting 300 m into Nelson Strait. Named after the town of Ugarchin in northern Bulgaria.

== Location ==
The point is located at 62°22′01″S 59°28′12″W, which is 4.7 km west of Smirnenski Point and 4.2 km southeast of Newell Point (Bulgarian early mapping in 2009).

== Maps ==
- L.L. Ivanov. Antarctica: Livingston Island and Greenwich, Robert, Snow and Smith Islands. Scale 1:120000 topographic map. Troyan: Manfred Wörner Foundation, 2010. ISBN 978-954-92032-9-5 (First edition 2009. ISBN 978-954-92032-6-4)
- Antarctic Digital Database (ADD). Scale 1:250000 topographic map of Antarctica. Scientific Committee on Antarctic Research (SCAR). Since 1993, regularly updated.
