= Makresh Rocks =

Group of rocks in Antarctica

- Location of Robert Island in the South Shetland Islands

- Location within Antarctica Location within Antarctic Peninsula

Geography
- Location: Antarctica
- Coordinates: 62°21′17″S 59°22′58″W
- Archipelago: South Shetland Islands

Administration
- Administered under the Antarctic Treaty System

Demographics
- Population: Uninhabited

Makresh Rocks (Bulgarian: скали Макреш, ‘Skali Makresh’ ska-'li 'ma-kresh) are a group of rocks situated 1.8 km (1.12 mi) northeast of Treklyano Island off the northeast coast of Robert Island, South Shetland Islands. Extending 600 m (656 yd) in west-southwest to east-northeast direction, and 270 m (295 yd) in northwest-southeast direction. The solitary Salient Rock 62°21′24″S 59°20′59″W is lying 1.73 km (1.07 mi) east of the midpoint of Makresh Rocks and 2 km (1.24 mi) northeast of Smirnenski Point.

The feature is named after the settlement of Makresh in northwestern Bulgaria. Salient Rock was descriptively named Roca Saliente by the Chilean Antarctic Expedition and charted in 1951.

== Location ==
Makresh Rocks are centred at 62°21′17″S 59°22′58″W (Bulgarian mapping in 2009).

== See also ==
- Composite Antarctic Gazetteer
- List of Antarctic islands south of 60° S
- SCAR
- Territorial claims in Antarctica

== Map ==
- L.L. Ivanov. Antarctica: Livingston Island and Greenwich, Robert, Snow and Smith Islands. Scale 1:120000 topographic map. Troyan: Manfred Wörner Foundation, 2009. ISBN 978-954-92032-6-4
