= Hristo Smirnenski =

Bulgarian poet and writer

- Христо Смирненски
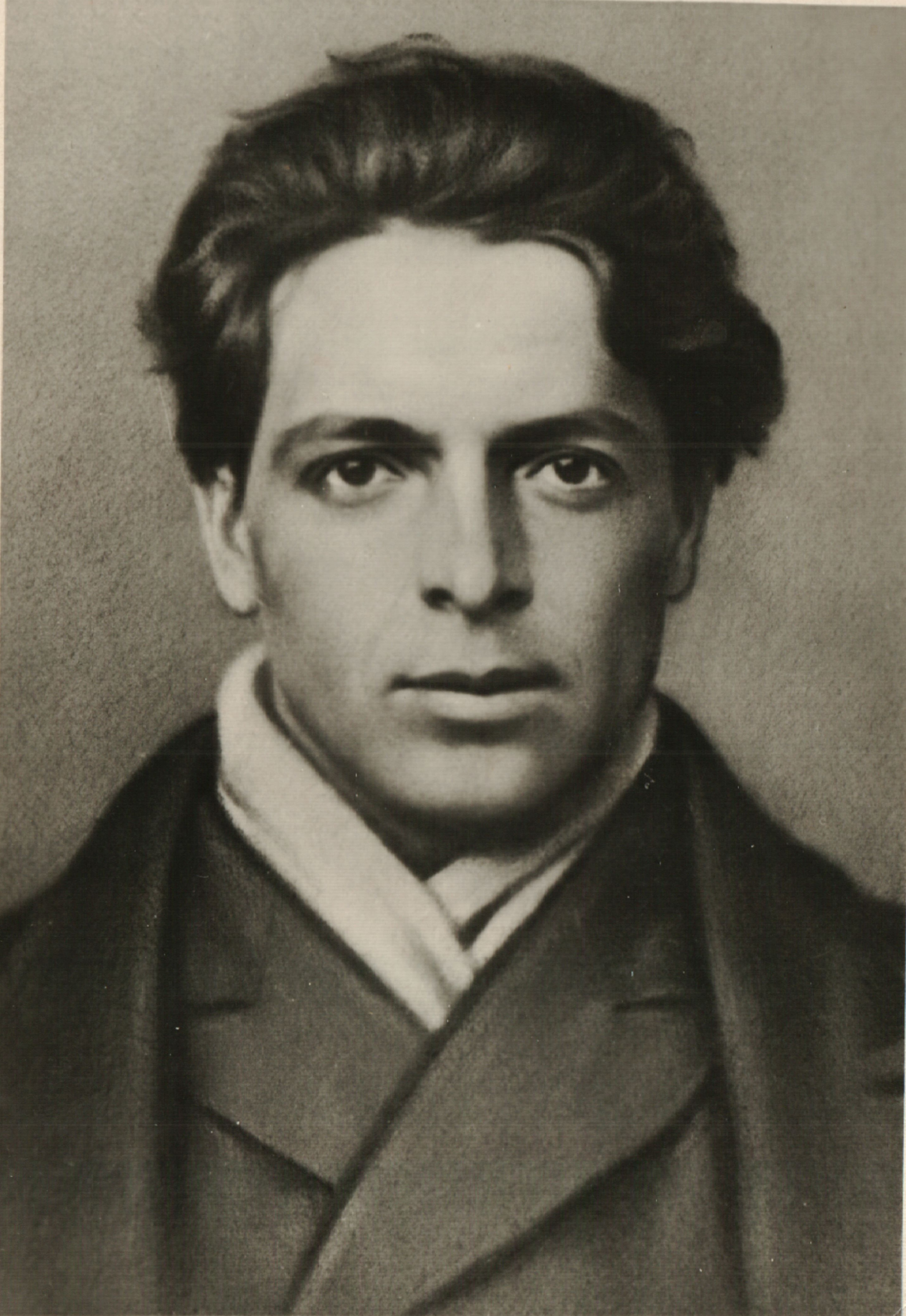
- Born: Hristo Dimitrov Izmirliev; September 17, 1898; Kılkış, Ottoman Empire
- Died: June 18, 1923 (aged 24); Sofia, Bulgaria
- Occupations: Poet, prose writer
- Spouse: Zhenya Dyustabanova

Hristo Dimitrov Izmirliev (Bulgarian: Христо Димитров Измирлиев), known as Hristo Smirnenski, (September 17, 1898, OS – June 18, 1923) was a Bulgarian poet and prose writer who joined the Bulgarian Communist Party and whose works championed socialist ideals in a light-hearted and humane style. He died at the age of 24, leaving a well regarded body of work produced over a career of only three years.

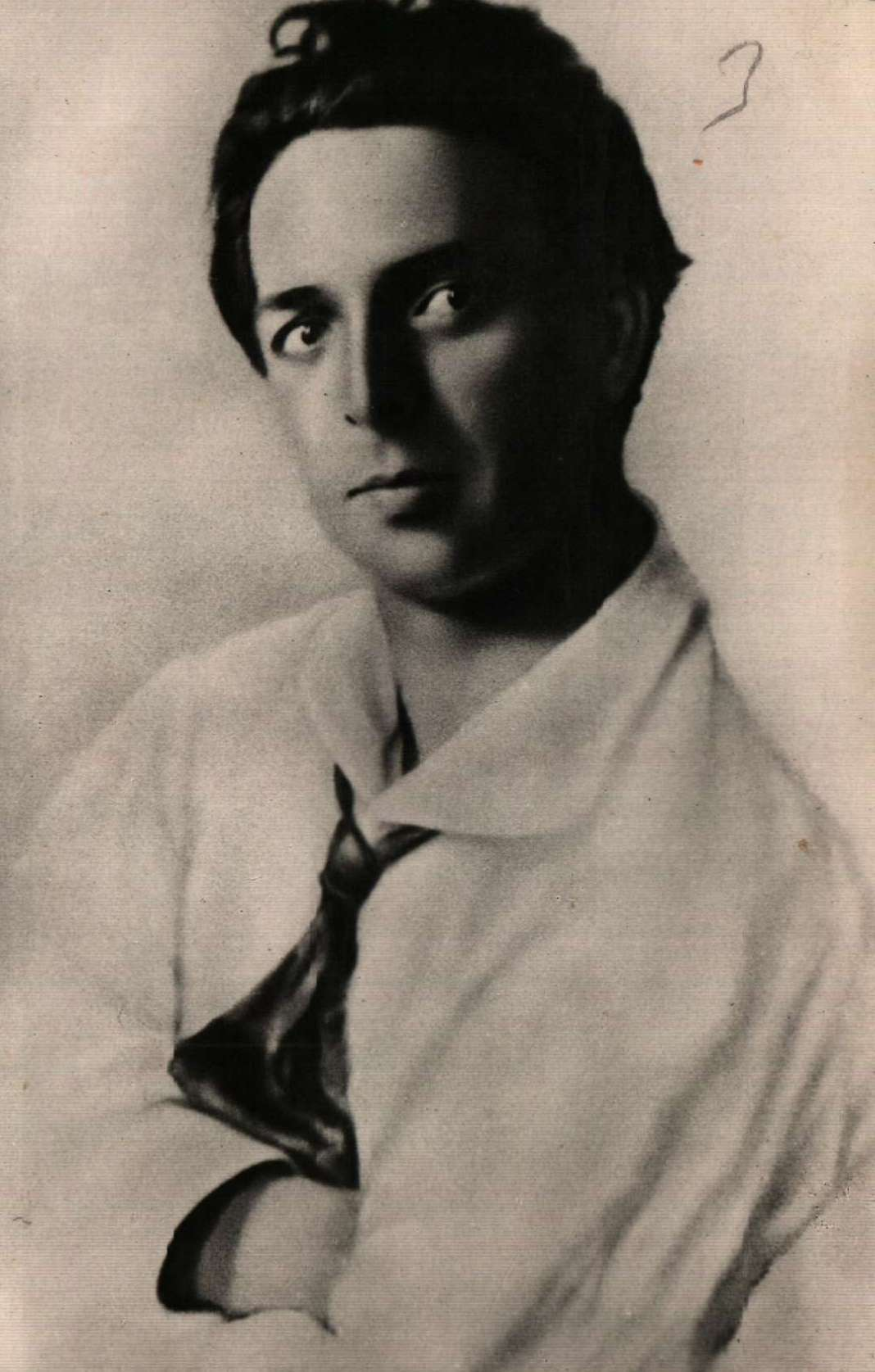
Hristo Smirnenski

== Early life ==
He was born Hristo Izmirliev, in 1898, in predominantly Bulgarian populated town of Kılkış (Kukush in Bulgarian) in then Ottoman Empire (today Kilkis, Greece). According to Tushe Deliivanov, a close relative and fellow writer, Hristo was from a poor family; Hristo's father, Dimitar Izmirliev, was an important and admired man in Kılkış, an activist of the IMRO and Bulgarian Exarchate.

On October 8, 1912, when Smirnenski was 14 years old, the First Balkan War started, and Bulgarian troops left Kılkış. After the victory of the Balkan allies, disagreements arose and the Second Balkan War broke out. After invading, Greek troops burned Kılkış; and the Izmirliev family, with thousands of other refugees, went to Bulgaria. Despite the poverty in which Dimitar Izmirliev and his wife found themselves, they made sure that their children studied. Hristo attended a technical school and his younger brother Anastas helped the family by selling newspapers.

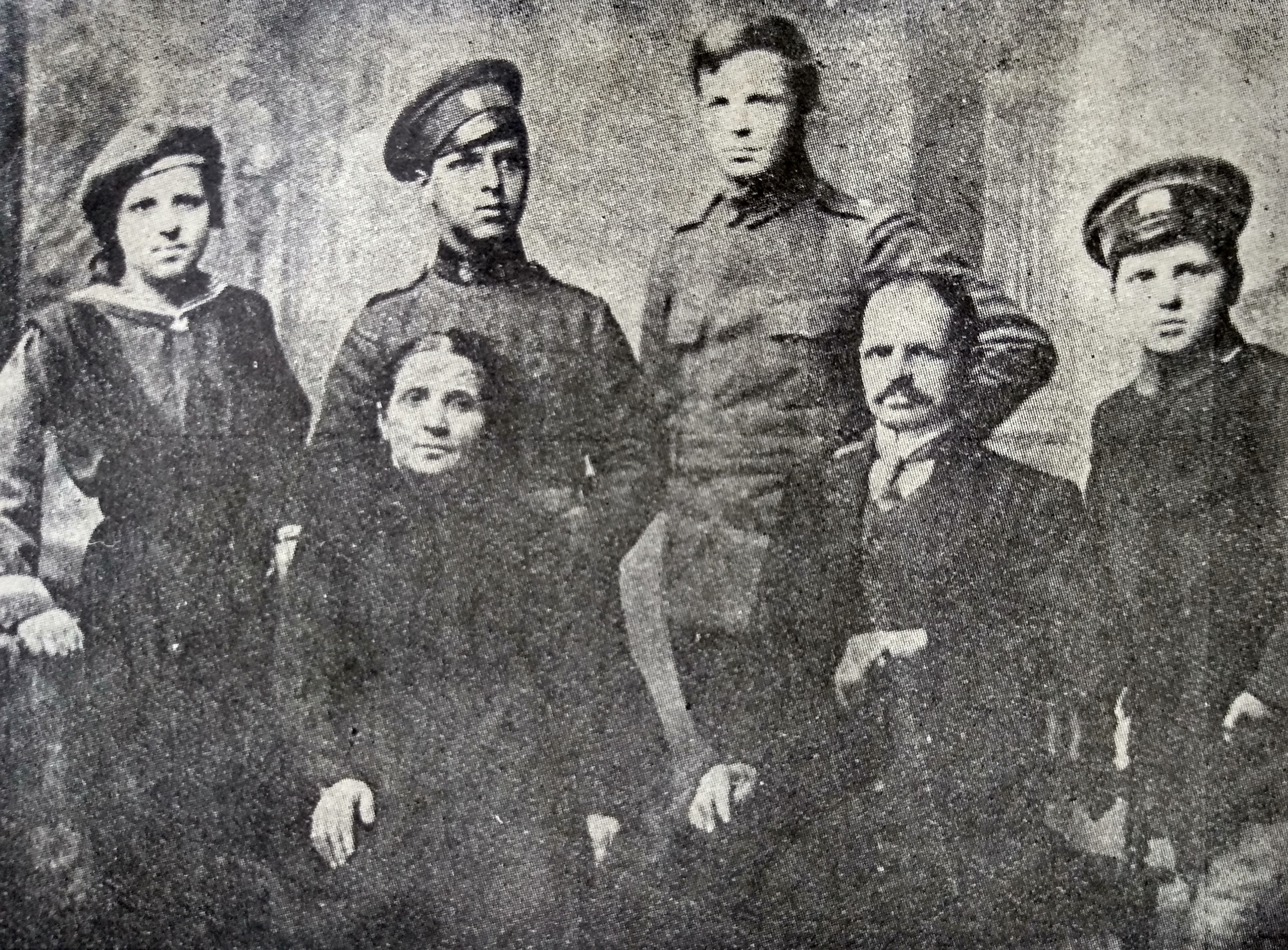
Hristo Smirnenski in Cadet's uniform with his family in 1917

Hristo Smirnenski made his literary debut in 1915 during his second year at college, in the satirical newspaper K'vo da e (Anything Goes). He first called himself "Smirnenski" in the magazine Smyah i salzi (Laughter and Tears). Despite his youth, Hirsto soon became one of the most sought after and popular writers of that time. In 1917, he first used the pseudonym Smirnenski.

As a student in a technical school, he continued to work in a colonial shop. During this time, the First World War started. In May 1917, Hristo enrolled as a cadet at the Military School, and from his barracks continued to write daily and publish humorous publications. At the end of 1917, the October Revolution broke out. A school-wide quarantine was imposed in order to keep students from being influenced by communist ideas. In April 1918, Hristo released his first collection of poems, Raznokalibreni vazdishki v stihove i proza (Sighs of Various Sizes, in Verse and Prose). The collection was of a humorous nature; it was later criticized by the author himself.

In 1918, the Soldiers' Revolt against King Ferdinand made a strong impact on his conceptual development. Smirnenski witnessed the bloodiest clash near Sugar Factory, in Sofia. Horrified by the cruelty with which the government defeated the rebels, he left the Military School in November; and his father was forced to pay compensation.

== Adult years ==
After entering civic life, Smirnenski became a member of the editorial board of Balgarin (Bulgarian), a popular newspaper, but made his living as a clerk, reporter, treasurer, editor, and proofreader.

The period from 1919 to 1920 was a turbulent one in Sofia. In November 1919, Smirnenski was published in the Communist Party's weekly literary magazine Red Laughter. Smirnenski's humor had become more socially inclusive. He participated in demonstrations and rallies for causes such as requesting amnesty for convicted soldiers, and improving the material condition of workers. Gradually, his social affiliation became a crucial factor in his ideological views and he became a fighter for the proletariat. In the spring of 1920, he became a member of the Communist Youth League, and in 1921, the Bulgarian Communist Party.

1920 was a turning point in Smirnenski's creative path. The communists saw his earlier creative pursuits as manifestations of the "decadent" symbolism of poetic achievements. According to socialist literary criticism, his first real poem was "The First of May", which was published in the May Day issue of Red Laughter. Smirnenski published a series of poems in the pages of Red Laughter: "Nee" (June 26, 1920), "Red Squads" (September 3, 1920), "The Street" and "Tomorrow" (September 24, 1920), "Herald of the New Day" (October 15, 1920), "Northern Lights" (October 29, 1920), "In the Storm" (January 6, 1921), "The Tempest in Berlin" (January 13, 1921), "Johan" (January 27 1921), and others. A few dozen of his works, representing his new aesthetic outlook, were published in Red Laughter and the party publication Workers' Newspaper.

At the end of February 1922, the party publisher, the General Workers Cooperative Society "Liberation", printed the second and final poetry collection published during Smirnenski's lifetime - To be the Day!. The first printing of 1,500 copies sold out quickly. A few months later cooperative "Liberation" issued a second edition. Through this work, Smirnenski rose to be known as a talented poet with his well-demarcated individuality - an artist whose work was socially engaged, who was seen as a model for a new social and aesthetic class, and whose work a model of Bulgarian literature in the second decade of the 20th century. With the new book, Smirnenski went beyond mere political and ideological commitment and showed a selfless and fervent humanity, the dream of happiness of mankind, in his philosophy. Here was Smirnenski at his most vivid. With his works, Smirnenski inspired millions of people to rise up against social injustice. With his lyrical style, Smirnenski sings longing for happiness and everlasting love to the people, philosophically summarized in "Herald of the New Day" - "What a divine happiness it is to be human".

Smirnenski's tireless work and deprivations undermined the 24-year-old poet's health and he died on June 18, 1923, from tuberculosis. He had followed political events and kept his faith, optimism, and sense of humor right until his last breath.

== Legacy ==
Despite his early death, Smirnenski is known as a very productive writer. In the eight brief years of his prolific and notable career, he wrote thousands of pieces of poetry and prose in various genres using more than 70 pseudonyms. One of the last editions of his collected works consists of eight volumes. He was lauded by left-leaning literary critics for championing socialist ideals in his works, and by certain of the modern conservative literary circles as the author of "Applied Poetry".

Smirnenski Point on Robert Island, South Shetland Islands, is named after Hristo Smirnenski.

== Sources ==
- Biography of Hristo Smirnenski
- Works by Hristo Smirnenski at LibriVox (public domain audiobooks)
