= Yundola Cove =

Location of Robert Island in the South Shetland Islands.

Topographic map of Livingston Island, Greenwich, Robert, Snow and Smith Islands.

Yundola Cove (Bulgarian: залив Юндола, romanized: zaliv Yundola, IPA: [ˈzalif ˈjundoɫɐ]) is a 1.34 km wide cove indenting for 670 m the north coast of Robert Island in the South Shetland Islands, Antarctica west of Lavrenov Point. The feature is named after Yundola Saddle between Rila Mountain and the Rhodope Mountains in southern Bulgaria.

== Location ==
The cove is located at 62°20′22″S 59°35′00″W (Bulgarian mapping in 2009).

== Map ==
- L.L. Ivanov. Antarctica: Livingston Island and Greenwich, Robert, Snow and Smith Islands. Scale 1:120000 topographic map. Troyan: Manfred Wörner Foundation, 2009. ISBN 978-954-92032-6-4
