= Tatul Island =

Island in the South Shetland Islands, Antarctica

- Location of Robert Island in the South Shetland Islands

- Location within Antarctica Location within Antarctic Peninsula

Geography
- Location: Antarctica
- Coordinates: 62°20′03″S 59°32′22″W
- Archipelago: South Shetland Islands
- Length: 0.35 km (0.217 mi)
- Width: 0.2 km (0.12 mi)

Administration
- Antarctica
- Administered under the Antarctic Treaty System

Demographics
- Population: uninhabited

Topographic map of Livingston Island, Greenwich, Robert, Snow and Smith Islands.

Tatul Island (Bulgarian: остров Татул, romanized: ostrov Tatul, IPA: [ˈɔstrof tɐˈtuɫ]) is a triangular ice-free island off the north coast of Robert Island in the South Shetland Islands, Antarctica. Extending 350 by 200 m (380 by 220 yd), the island emerged as a distinct geographical entity following the retreat of Robert Island's ice cap in the late 20th and early 21st century.

The feature is named after the settlement of Tatul adjacent to a major Thracian shrine complex in the Rhodope Mountains, Bulgaria related to the cult of Orpheus.

== Location ==
The island is located 130 m (140 yd) north of Robert Island,
550 m (600 yd) south-southwest of Lientur Rocks and 950 m (1,040 yd) west-northwest of Newell Point. Bulgarian early mapping in 2009.

== See also ==
- Composite Antarctic Gazetteer
- List of Antarctic islands south of 60° S
- SCAR
- Territorial claims in Antarctica

== Maps ==
- L.L. Ivanov. Antarctica: Livingston Island and Greenwich, Robert, Snow and Smith Islands. Scale 1:120000 topographic map. Troyan: Manfred Wörner Foundation, 2009. ISBN 978-954-92032-6-4
