= Osenovlag Island =

Island in the South Shetland Islands

- Location of Robert Island in the South Shetland Islands

- Location within Antarctica Location within Antarctic Peninsula

Geography
- Location: Antarctica
- Coordinates: 62°20′54.6″S 59°40′25″W
- Archipelago: South Shetland Islands

Administration
- Administered under the Antarctic Treaty System

Demographics
- Population: Uninhabited

Osenovlag Island (Bulgarian: остров Осеновлаг, romanized: ostrov Osenovlag, IPA: [ˈɔstrof oˈsɛnovɫɐk]) is the easternmost island in the Onogur group off the northwest coast of Robert Island in the South Shetland Islands, Antarctica. It is named after the settlement of Osenovlag in Western Bulgaria.

== Description ==
The feature is rocky, extending 510 metres (1,670 ft) in southeast-northwest direction and 130 metres (430 ft) wide. The area was visited by early 19th century sealers.

The island is named after the settlement of Osenovlag in Western Bulgaria. British mapping took place in 1968 and Bulgarian mapping in 2009.

== Location ==
Osenovlag Island is located at 62°20′54.6″S 59°40′25″W, which is 3.55 kilometres (2.21 mi) northeast of Fort William Point and 1.24 kilometres (0.77 mi) southwest of Hammer Point. It is separated from Shipot Point by a 90-metre (300 ft) wide passage.

== Maps ==
- Livingston Island to King George Island. Scale 1:200000. Admiralty Nautical Chart 1776. Taunton: UK Hydrographic Office, 1968.
- L.L. Ivanov. Antarctica: Livingston Island and Greenwich, Robert, Snow and Smith Islands. Scale 1:120000 topographic map. Troyan: Manfred Wörner Foundation, 2009. ISBN 978-954-92032-6-4 (Second edition 2010, ISBN 978-954-92032-9-5)
- Antarctic Digital Database (ADD). Scale 1:250000 topographic map of Antarctica. Scientific Committee on Antarctic Research (SCAR). Since 1993, regularly upgraded and updated.

== See also ==
- List of Antarctic and subantarctic islands
