= Liberty Rocks =

Rocks in the South Shetland Islands, Antarctica

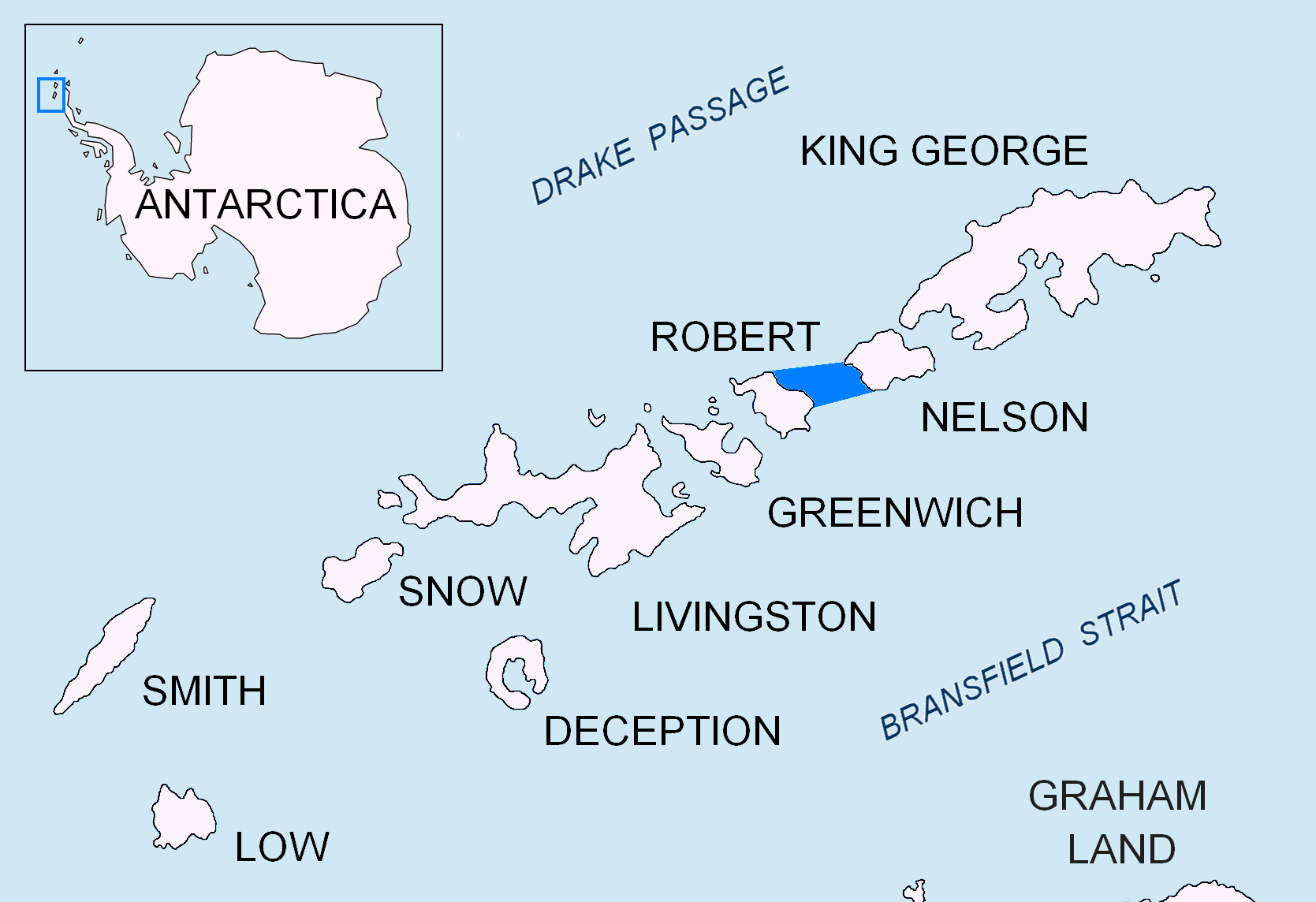
- Location of Nelson Strait in the South Shetland Islands

- Location on Antarctic Peninsula Location in Antarctica

Geography
- Location: Antarctica
- Coordinates: 62°18′50.6″S 59°27′44.2″W
- Archipelago: South Shetland Islands

Administration
- Administered under the Antarctic Treaty System

Demographics
- Population: Uninhabited

Liberty Rocks is a group of four prominent adjacent rocks lying at the north entrance to Nelson Strait in the South Shetland Islands, Antarctica and extending 430 by 120 m (470 by 131 yd). The area was visited by early 19th-century sealers.

The feature is named after the British sealing vessel Liberty under Captain Peacock that visited the South Shetlands in 1821–22.

== Location ==
The rocks are centred at 62°18′50.6″S 59°27′44.2″W which is 3.95 km (2.45 mi) northeast of Newell Point, Robert Island, 1.65 km (1.03 mi) southeast of Mellona Rocks, 11.38 km (7.07 mi) west by south of Harmony Point, Nelson Island and 6 km (3.73 mi) northwest of Makresh Rocks (British mapping in 1822, 1962 and 1968, Chilean in 1971, Argentine in 1980, and Bulgarian in 2009).

Topographic map of Livingston Island, Greenwich, Robert, Snow and Smith Islands

== See also ==
- Composite Antarctic Gazetteer
- List of Antarctic islands south of 60° S
- SCAR
- Territorial claims in Antarctica

== Maps ==
- Chart of South Shetland including Coronation Island, &c. from the exploration of the sloop Dove in the years 1821 and 1822 by George Powell Commander of the same. Scale ca. 1:200000. London: Laurie, 1822.
- L.L. Ivanov. Antarctica: Livingston Island and Greenwich, Robert, Snow and Smith Islands. Scale 1:120000 topographic map. Troyan: Manfred Wörner Foundation, 2009. ISBN 978-954-92032-6-4
