= Opaka Rocks =

Antarctic rock formations

- Location of Robert Island in the South Shetland Islands.

- Location within Antarctica Location within Antarctic Peninsula

Geography
- Location: Antarctica
- Coordinates: 62°18′19″S 59°35′10″W
- Archipelago: South Shetland Islands

Administration
- Administered under the Antarctic Treaty System

Demographics
- Population: Uninhabited

Opaka Rocks (Bulgarian: скали Опака, ‘Skali Opaka’ ska-'li 'o-pa-ka) are a group of rocks with the principal one situated 700 m (766 yd) north of Henfield Rock, 3.44 km (2.14 mi) east of Pordim Islands and 4.79 km west by south of Mellona Rocks off the north coast of Robert Island, South Shetland Islands. Bulgarian early early mapping in 2009. Named after the town of Opaka in northeastern Bulgaria.

== See also ==
- Composite Antarctic Gazetteer
- List of Antarctic islands south of 60° S
- SCAR
- Territorial claims in Antarctica

== Maps ==
- L.L. Ivanov. Antarctica: Livingston Island and Greenwich, Robert, Snow and Smith Islands. Scale 1:120000 topographic map. Troyan: Manfred Wörner Foundation, 2009. ISBN 978-954-92032-6-4
