= Treklyano Island =

Island of the South Shetland Islands in the Southern Ocean

- Location of Robert Island in the South Shetland Islands

- Location within Antarctica Location within Antarctic Peninsula

Geography
- Location: Antarctica
- Coordinates: 62°22′04″S 59°24′35″W
- Archipelago: South Shetland Islands

Administration
- Antarctica
- Administered under the Antarctic Treaty System

Demographics
- Population: uninhabited

Topographic map of Livingston Island, Greenwich, Robert, Snow and Smith Islands.

Treklyano Island (Bulgarian: остров Трекляно, romanized: ostrov Treklyano, IPA: [ˈɔstrof ˈtrɛkʎɐno]) is an island off the northeast coast of Robert Island, South Shetland Islands Extending 330 by 250 m (360 by 270 yd), with a low rocky formation projecting 300 m (330 yd) northeastwards, the island emerged as a distinct geographical entity following the retreat of Robert Island's ice cap in the late 20th century. Named after the settlement of Treklyano in western Bulgaria.

== Location ==
The island is located at 62°22′04″S 59°24′35″W which is 3.8 km (2.4 mi) northwest of Kitchen Point, 1.4 km (0.87 mi) west of Smirnenski Point and 6.6 km (4.1 mi) southeast of Newell Point (Bulgarian early mapping in 2009).

== See also ==
- Composite Antarctic Gazetteer
- List of Antarctic islands south of 60° S
- SCAR
- Territorial claims in Antarctica

== Maps ==
- L.L. Ivanov. Antarctica: Livingston Island and Greenwich, Robert, Snow and Smith Islands. Scale 1:120000 topographic map. Troyan: Manfred Wörner Foundation, 2009. ISBN 978-954-92032-6-4
