= Nevestino Cove =

Cove in Antarctica

Coordinates: 62°20′17″S 59°37′46″W

Location of Robert Island in the South Shetland Islands.

Topographic map of Livingston Island, Greenwich, Robert, Snow and Smith Islands.

Nevestino Cove (Bulgarian: залив Невестино, romanized: zaliv Nevestino, IPA: [ˈzalif nɛˈvɛstino]) is the 1.55 km wide cove indenting for 1.5 km the north coast of Robert Island, South Shetland Islands between Catharina Point and Hammer Point. Bulgarian early mapping in 2009. Named after the three settlements of Nevestino situated in southeastern, southern, and western Bulgaria respectively.

== Map ==
- L.L. Ivanov. Antarctica: Livingston Island and Greenwich, Robert, Snow and Smith Islands. Scale 1:120000 topographic map. Troyan: Manfred Wörner Foundation, 2009. ISBN 978-954-92032-6-4
