= Rogozen Island =

Island in the South Shetland Islands

- Location of Robert Island in the South Shetland Islands

- Location within Antarctica Location within Antarctic Peninsula

Geography
- Location: Antarctica
- Coordinates: 62°19′54″S 59°42′00″W
- Archipelago: South Shetland Islands
- Area: 16 ha (40 acres)
- Length: 0.76 km (0.472 mi)

Administration
- Antarctica
- Administered under the Antarctic Treaty System

Demographics
- Population: uninhabited

Rogozen Island (Bulgarian: остров Рогозен, romanized: ostrov Rogozen, IPA: [ˈɔstrof ˈrɔɡozɛn]) is a conspicuous island off the northwest coast of Robert Island, South Shetland Islands situated 920 m (1,010 yd) north-northeast of Cornwall Island, 470 m (510 yd) south-southwest of Heywood Island, and 1.74 km (1.08 mi) northwest of Svetulka Island in the Onogur group. Extending 760 m (830 yd) in east-west direction and 260 m (280 yd) wide. Surface area 16 hectares (40 acres).

Bulgarian early mapping in 2009. Named after the settlement of Rogozen in northwestern Bulgaria in connection with the Rogozen Thracian treasure.

== See also ==
- Composite Antarctic Gazetteer
- List of Antarctic islands south of 60° S
- SCAR
- Territorial claims in Antarctica
