= Izgrev, Burgas Province =

Izgrev Изгрев
- Village
- Location within Bulgaria
- Coordinates: 42°08′N 27°48′E
- Country: Bulgaria
- Province: Burgas Province
- Municipality: Tsarevo Municipality
- Time zone: UTC+2 (EET)
  - Summer (DST): UTC+3 (EEST)

Izgrev (Bulgarian: Изгрев) is a village in Tsarevo Municipality, in Burgas Province, in southeastern Bulgaria. It is situated in Strandzha mountains.

== Honours ==
Izgrev Passage in Antarctica is named after the village.
