= Clothier Harbor =

Clothier Harbor (62°22′S 59°40′W) is a small harbor on the northwest side of Robert Island, 1.5 nautical miles (3 km) northeast of the west end of the island, in the South Shetland Islands. It was named by American sealers in about 1820 after the sealing vessel Clothier, under Captain Alexander Clark, one of the several American sealing vessels headquartered at this harbor during the 1820–21 season. The Clothier went aground here and sank on December 9, 1820.
