= Izgrev, Blagoevgrad Province =

Izgrev Изгрев
- Village
- Location within Bulgaria
- Coordinates: 42°1′N 23°6′E
- Country: Bulgaria
- Province: Blagoevgrad Province
- Municipality: Blagoevgrad

Government
  - Mayor: Yordan Kitanov (Ind.)

Area
  - Total: 6.306 km^{2} (2.435 sq mi)
- Elevation: 561 m (1,841 ft)

Population (15 December 2010)
  - Total: 521
- GRAO
- Time zone: UTC+2 (EET)
  - Summer (DST): UTC+3 (EEST)
- Postal Code: 2711
- Area code: 073

Izgrev is a village in Blagoevgrad Municipality, in Blagoevgrad Province, Bulgaria. It is situated in the foothills of Rila mountain 1 kilometer southeast of Blagoevgrad. The village was created in 1963 and named Aidarovo. The name was changed to Izgrev in 1987.

== Honours ==
Izgrev Passage in Antarctica is named after the village.
