= Mellona Rocks =

Group of rocks in South Shetland Islands, Antarctica

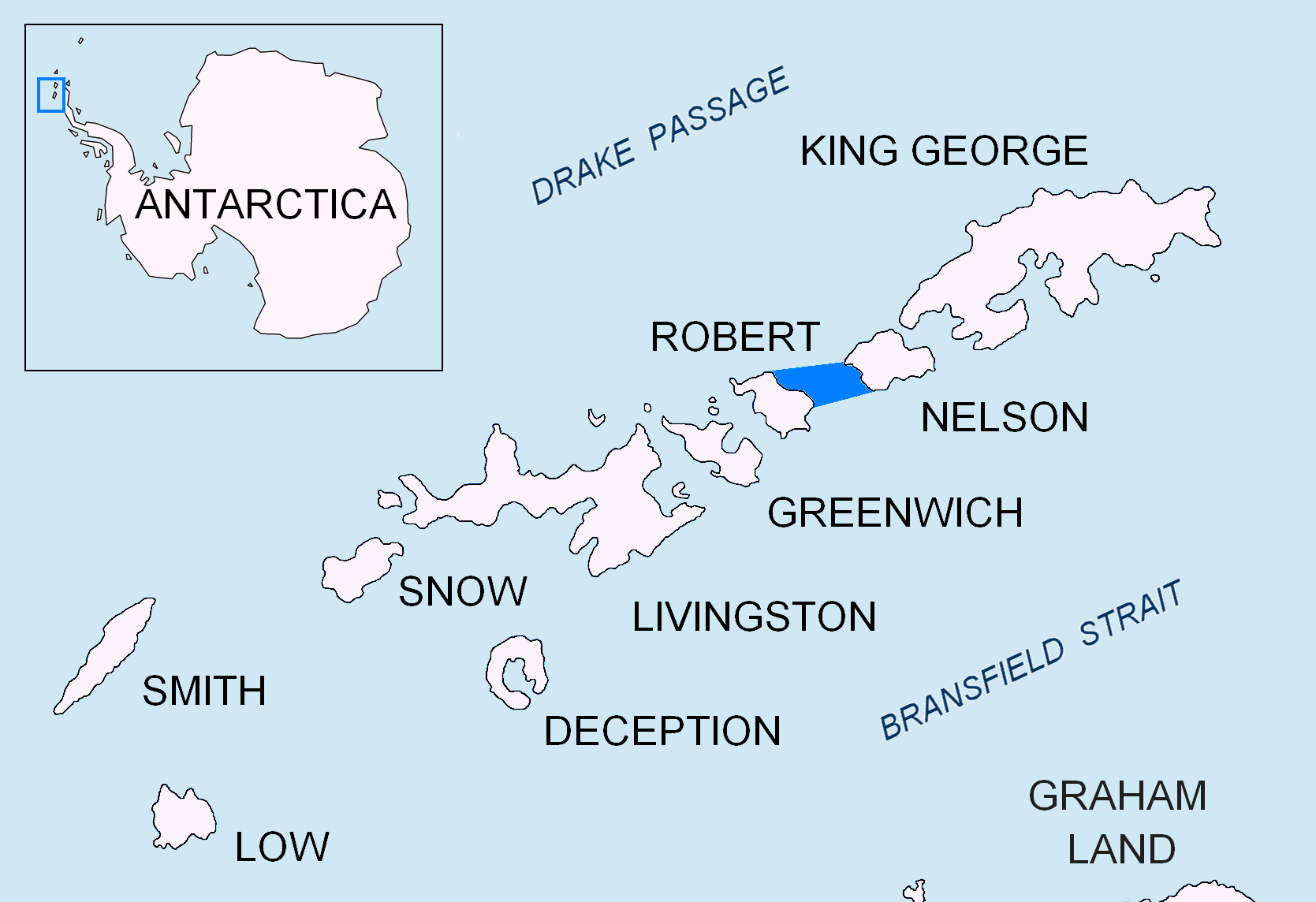
- Nelson Strait

- Location of Mellona Rocks Mellona Rocks (Antarctica)

Geography
- Location: Antarctica
- Coordinates: 62°17′49.3″S 59°29′43.6″W
- Archipelago: South Shetland Islands

Administration
- Administered under the Antarctic Treaty System

Demographics
- Population: Uninhabited

Mellona Rocks is a group of scattered rocks lying at the north entrance to Nelson Strait in the South Shetland Islands, Antarctica and extending 1.7 by 0.9 km (1.06 by 0.56 mi). The area was known to the early 19th-century sealers and sometimes included under the names 'Heywood Islands' or 'Powels Islands'.

The feature is named after the British sealing ship Mellona under Captain Thomas Johnson that operated in the South Shetlands in 1821–22.

== Location ==
The rocks are centred at 62°17′49.3″S 59°29′43.6″W which is 4.63 km (2.88 mi) north-northeast of Newell Point, Robert Island, 4.79 km (2.98 mi) east-northeast of the midpoint of Opaka Rocks, 13.1 km (8.14 mi) west of Harmony Point, Nelson Island and 2.35 km (1.46 mi) northwest of Liberty Rocks (British mapping in 1822, 1962 and 1968, Chilean in 1961 and 1971, Argentine in 1980, and Bulgarian in 2009).

Topographic map of Livingston Island, Greenwich, Robert, Snow and Smith Islands.

== See also ==
- Composite Antarctic Gazetteer
- List of Antarctic islands south of 60° S
- SCAR
- Territorial claims in Antarctica

== Maps ==
- Chart of South Shetland including Coronation Island, &c. from the exploration of the sloop Dove in the years 1821 and 1822 by George Powell Commander of the same. Scale ca. 1:200000. London: Laurie, 1822.
- L.L. Ivanov. Antarctica: Livingston Island and Greenwich, Robert, Snow and Smith Islands. Scale 1:120000 topographic map. Troyan: Manfred Wörner Foundation, 2009. ISBN 978-954-92032-6-4
