= Vrabcha Cove =

Cove in the South Shetland Islands, Antarctica

Location of Robert Island in the South Shetland Islands.

Topographic map of Livingston Island, Greenwich, Robert, Snow and Smith Islands.

Vrabcha Cove (Bulgarian: залив Врабча, romanized: zaliv Vrabcha, IPA: [ˈzaliv ˈvrapt͡ʃɐ]) is the 900 m wide cove indenting for 1 km the west coast of Heywood Island off the northwest coast of Robert Island in the South Shetland Islands, Antarctica.

The cove is named after the settlement of Vrabcha in western Bulgaria.

== Location ==
Vrabcha Cove is located at 62°19′16″S 59°41′27″W. Bulgarian mapping in 2009.

== Map ==
- L.L. Ivanov. Antarctica: Livingston Island and Greenwich, Robert, Snow and Smith Islands. Scale 1:120000 topographic map. Troyan: Manfred Wörner Foundation, 2009. ISBN 978-954-92032-6-4
