= Asses Ears (South Shetland Islands) =

Islands in Antarctica

- Location of Robert Island in the South Shetland Islands.

- Location within Antarctica Location within Antarctic Peninsula

Geography
- Location: Antarctica
- Coordinates: 62°19′S 59°45′W
- Total islands: 3

Administration
- Administered under the Antarctic Treaty System

Demographics
- Population: Uninhabited

The Asses Ears are a set of three small islands off northwest Robert Island, forming the north part of Potmess Rocks in English Strait, South Shetland Islands. Presumably known to early sealers, the feature was charted and named descriptively by personnel on Discovery II in 1934–35.

== See also ==
- List of Antarctic and sub-Antarctic islands
- South Shetland Islands

== Map ==
- L.L. Ivanov. Antarctica: Livingston Island and Greenwich, Robert, Snow and Smith Islands. Scale 1:120000 topographic map. Troyan: Manfred Wörner Foundation, 2009. ISBN 978-954-92032-6-4
