= Opaka =

Opaka Опака
- City
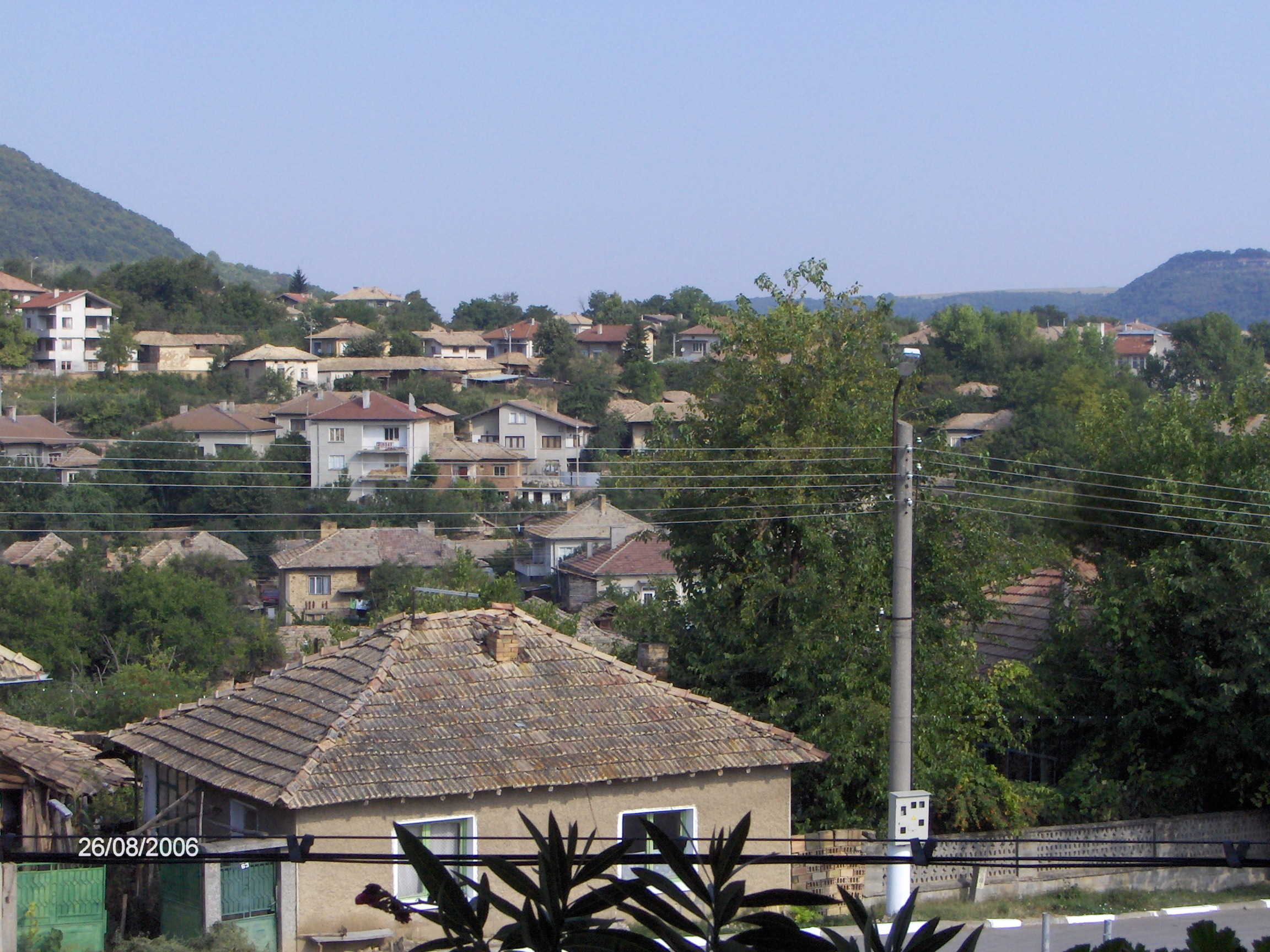

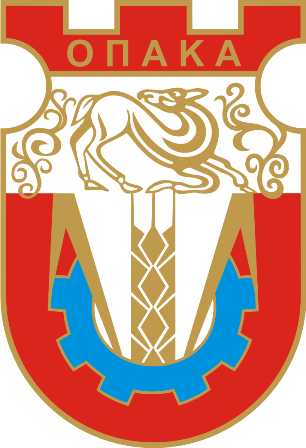
- Coat of arms

- Location of Opaka
- Coordinates: 43°26′45.96″N 26°10′19.2″E
- Country: Bulgaria
- Province (Oblast): Targovishte
- Municipality: Opaka
- Elevation: 185 m (607 ft)

Population (2011)
  - Total: 2,833
- Time zone: UTC+2 (EET)
  - Summer (DST): UTC+3 (EEST)
- Postal Code: 7840
- Area code: 06039
- License Plate: T

Opaka (Bulgarian: Опака [opɐˈka]) is a town in Targovishte Province in northeast Bulgaria. As of December 2009, the town had a population of 2,873. It covers an area of 57 square kilometres (22 sq mi). It is 70 kilometres (43 mi) south of the city of Rousse on the border with Romania and 305 kilometres (190 mi) northeast of the Bulgarian capital, Sofia. Archeologists have found evidence of Thracian, Roman and Slavonic settlements in the area. Near the village of Krepcha, a stone monastery is the site of the oldest known Old Bulgarian Cyrillic inscription, dated from around 920 CE. A 2nd century Thracian tumulus containing various artifacts, including six leaves of a golden wreath and bronze figurines, was excavated in 2011.

It is the seat of Opaka Municipality.

== Honour ==
Opaka Rocks off Robert Island, South Shetland Islands are named after Opaka.
