= Priboy =

Priboy Прибой
- Settlement
- Location within Republic of Buryatia Location within Russia
- Coordinates: 51°36′N 105°25′E
- Country: Russia
- Region: Republic of Buryatia
- District: Kabansky District
- Time zone: UTC+8:00

Priboy (Russian: Прибой) is a rural locality (a settlement) in Kabansky District, Republic of Buryatia, Russia. The population was 38 as of 2010. There are 2 streets.

== Geography ==
Priboy is located 106 km southwest of Kabansk (the district's administrative centre) by road. Rechka Mishikha is the nearest rural locality.
