= Voluyak Rocks =

Rocks in the South Shetland Islands, Antarctica

- Location of Greenwich Island in the South Shetland Islands

- Location on Antarctic Peninsula Location in Antarctica

Geography
- Location: Antarctica
- Coordinates: 62°26′02″S 59°58′22″W
- Archipelago: South Shetland Islands
- Length: 1.9 km (1.18 mi)

Administration
- Antarctica
- Administered under the Antarctic Treaty System

Demographics
- Population: uninhabited

Voluyak Rocks (Bulgarian: скали Волуяк, ‘Skali Voluyak’ ska-'li vo-'lu-yak) is a chain of rocks off the north coast of Greenwich Island in the South Shetland Islands, Antarctica situated 400 m (440 yd) north of Pavlikeni Point. Extending 1.9 km (1.2 mi) in southeast–northwest direction.

The rocks are named after the settlement of Voluyak in western Bulgaria.

== Location ==
Voluyak Rocks are centred at 62°26′02″S 59°58′22″W (British mapping in 1968 and Bulgarian in 2009).

Topographic map of Livingston Island, Greenwich, Robert, Snow and Smith Islands

== See also ==
- Composite Antarctic Gazetteer
- List of Antarctic islands south of 60° S
- SCAR
- Territorial claims in Antarctica

== Map ==
L.L. Ivanov. Antarctica: Livingston Island and Greenwich, Robert, Snow and Smith Islands. Scale 1:120000 topographic map. Troyan: Manfred Wörner Foundation, 2009. ISBN 978-954-92032-6-4
