= Vodoley Rock =

Rock in the South Shetland Islands, Antarctica

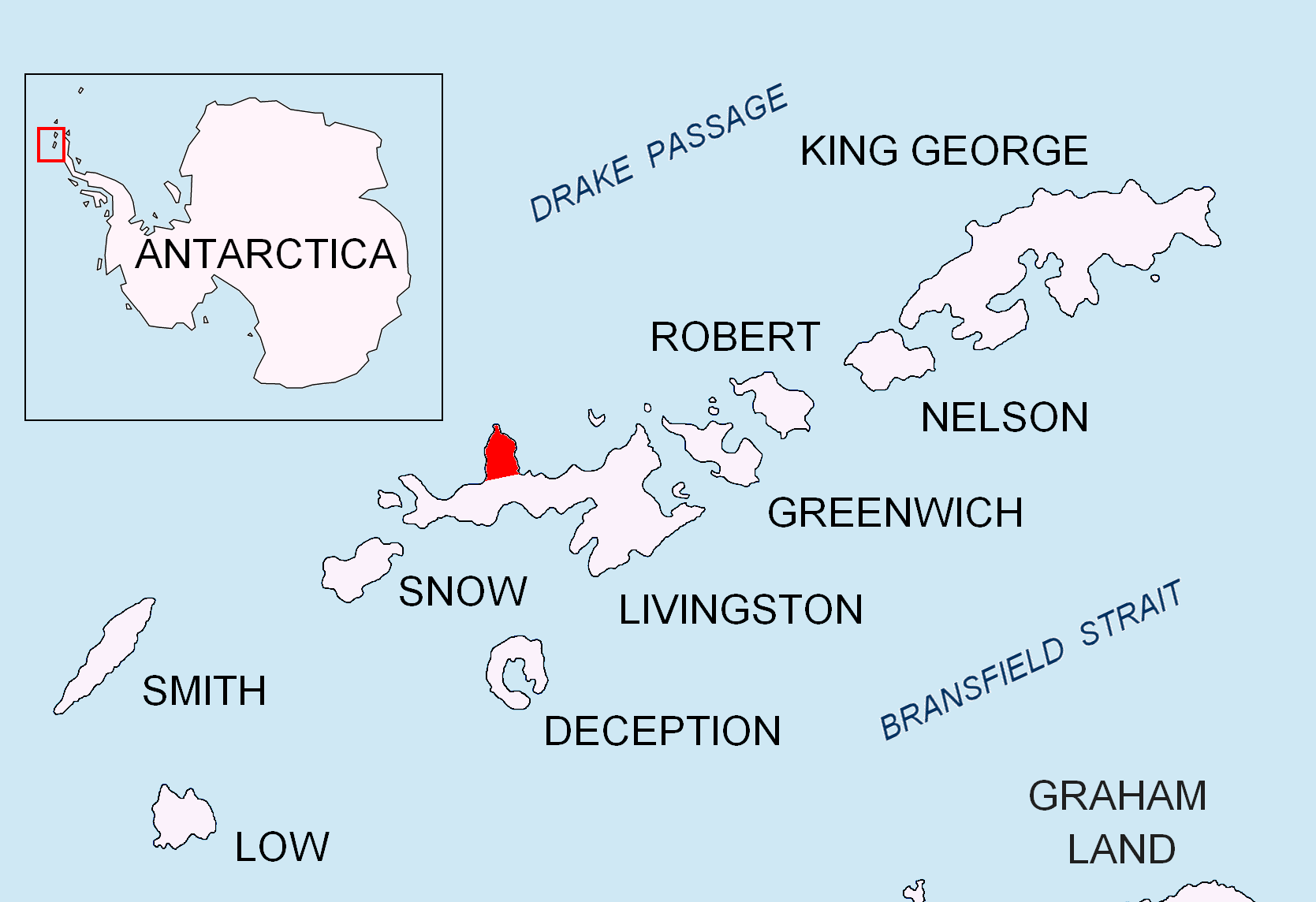
- Location of Ioannes Paulus II Peninsula in the South Shetland Islands

- Location on Antarctic Peninsula Location in Antarctica

Geography
- Location: Antarctica
- Coordinates: 62°31′13.5″S 60°51′35″W
- Archipelago: South Shetland Islands

Administration
- Antarctica
- Administered under the Antarctic Treaty System

Demographics
- Population: uninhabited

Vodoley Rock is the rock extending 220 m (720 ft) in northwest–southeast direction and 110 m (360 ft) wide in Barclay Bay on the west side of Ioannes Paulus II Peninsula on Livingston Island in the South Shetland Islands, Antarctica. The area was visited by early 19th century sealers operating on nearby Byers Peninsula and Cape Shirreff.

The feature is named after the settlement of Vodoley in northern Bulgaria.

== Location ==
The rock is located at 62°31′13″S 60°51′35″W which is 1.2 km (0.75 mi)west-southwest of Dreyfus Point, 1.8 km (1.1 mi) northwest of Scesa Point and 4.75 km (2.95 mi) northeast of Frederick Rocks (Bulgarian mapping in 2005 and 2009).

Topographic map of Livingston Island and Smith Island

== See also ==
- Composite Antarctic Gazetteer
- List of Antarctic islands south of 60° S
- SCAR
- Territorial claims in Antarctica

== Maps ==
- L.L. Ivanov et al. Antarctica: Livingston Island and Greenwich Island, South Shetland Islands. Scale 1:100000 topographic map. Sofia: Antarctic Place-names Commission of Bulgaria, 2005.
- L.L. Ivanov. Antarctica: Livingston Island and Greenwich, Robert, Snow and Smith Islands. Scale 1:120000 topographic map. Troyan: Manfred Wörner Foundation, 2009. ISBN 978-954-92032-6-4
- Antarctic Digital Database (ADD). Scale 1:250000 topographic map of Antarctica. Scientific Committee on Antarctic Research (SCAR). Since 1993, regularly upgraded and updated.
