= Opaka Municipality =

- Municipality
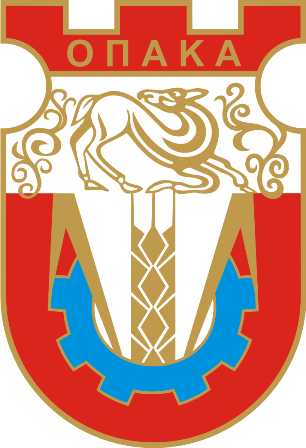
- Coat of arms

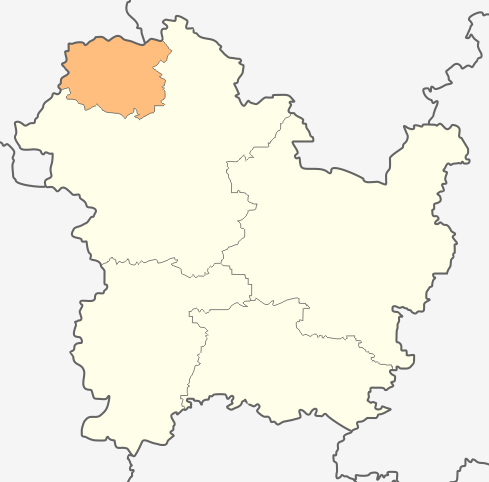
- Location of Opaka Municipality in Targovishte Province

- Location of Opaka Municipality in Bulgaria
- Coordinates: 43°27′00″N 26°10′00″E
- Country: Bulgaria
- Province: Targovishte Province
- Capital: Opaka

Area
  - Total: 157 km^{2} (61 sq mi)
- Elevation: 247 m (810 ft)

Population (2011)
  - Total: 6,664
  - Density: 42.4/km^{2} (110/sq mi)
- Postal code: 7840
- Area code: 06039

Opaka Municipality (Bulgarian: Община Котел) is a municipality in the Targovishte Province of Bulgaria.

== Demography ==
Ethnic composition of Opaka Municipality
1. Turks (57.9%)
2. Bulgarians (21.5%)
3. No identification (20.5%)
4. Other (0.25%)

At the 2011 census, the population of Opaka was 6,664. Most of the inhabitants were Turks (57.89%), with a minority of Bulgarians (21.5%). 20.46% of the population's ethnicity was unknown.

== Villages ==
In addition to the capital town of Opaka, there are five villages in the municipality:

- Goliamo Gradishte
- Gorsko Ablanovo
- Garchinovo
- Krepcha
- Liublen
