= Asses Ears (Alaska) =

Coordinates: 65°44′45″N 163°11′00″W

Highest point
- Elevation: 1,824 ft (556 m)

Naming
- Etymology: August 11, 1816 by Lieutenant Otto von Kotzebue, Imperial Russian Navy

Geography
- Country: USA
- State: Alaska
- Region: Northwest Arctic

Asses Ears is a summit in Northwest Arctic Borough, Alaska, in the United States. It has an elevation of 1,824 feet (556 m).

The mountain was so named in 1816 by Otto von Kotzebue because "its summit is in the form of two asses' ears".
