= Heywood Island (Antarctica) =

Island of Antarctica

- Location of Robert Island in the South Shetland Islands

- Location within Antarctic Peninsula Location within Antarctica

Geography
- Location: Antarctica
- Coordinates: 62°19′11″S 59°41′08″W
- Archipelago: South Shetland Islands
- Area: 78 ha (190 acres)
- Length: 1.4 km (0.87 mi)
- Width: 0.85 km (0.528 mi)

Administration
- Administered under the Antarctic Treaty System

Demographics
- Population: Uninhabited

Heywood Island is the largest of the islands off the north coast of Robert Island in the South Shetland Islands, Antarctica. It is named after Captain Peter Heywood, RN (1773–1831), commanding HMS Nereus off the east coast of South America in 1810–13, formerly a midshipman in HMS Bounty under Captain William Bligh. The area was visited by early 19th century sealers operating from nearby Clothier Harbour.

== Description ==
The island lies 2.88 km (1.79 mi) west by north of Catharina Point, Robert Island; 2.24 km (1.39 mi) north-west of Hammer Point, Robert Island; 470 m (510 yd) north-north-east of Rogozen Island; 4.12 km (2.56 mi) north-north-east of Fort William, Robert Island; and 5.35 km (3.32 mi) east-north-east of Table Island (British mapping in 1822, 1935, 1962, and 1968, American in 1942, Argentine in 1946 and 1957, Chilean in 1957 and 1971, and Bulgarian in 2009). It is 1.4 by 0.85 km (0.87 by 0.53 mi) long with a surface area of 78 hectares (190 acres). It is ice-free, low, and horseshoe-shaped, its west coast indented for 1 km by Vrabcha Cove.

== Important Bird Area ==
Heywood Island has been identified as an Important Bird Area (IBA) by BirdLife International, because it supports one of the largest chinstrap penguin colonies on the Antarctic Peninsula with around 90,000 pairs.

== See also ==
- List of Antarctic islands south of 60° S
