= Catharina Point =

Rocky point on Robert Island, Antarctica

Location of Robert Island in the South Shetland Islands.

Topographic map of Livingston Island, Greenwich, Robert, Snow and Smith Islands.

Catharina Point, also Varoli Point, is a rocky point projecting 1.5 km northwards into Drake Passage to form the north extremity of Robert Island in the South Shetland Islands, Antarctica and the northeast side of the entrance to Nevestino Cove. The area was visited by early 19th century sealers operating from nearby Clothier Harbour.

The feature is named after the American sealing vessel Catharina under Captain Joseph Henfield that visited the South Shetlands in 1820–21.

== Location ==
The point is located at 62°19′41.3″S 59°37′13.9″W which is 7.24 km northeast of Fort William, 2.08 km northeast of Hammer Point and 5.27 km west-northwest of Newell Point (Chilean mapping in 1951 and 1971, British in 1962 and 1968, and Bulgarian in 2009).

== Maps ==
- L.L. Ivanov. Antarctica: Livingston Island and Greenwich, Robert, Snow and Smith Islands. Scale 1:120000 topographic map. Troyan: Manfred Wörner Foundation, 2009. ISBN 978-954-92032-6-4
