= Smirnenski Point =

Point on Robert Island, Antarctica

Coordinates: 62°22′07″S 59°22′45″W

Location of Robert Island in the South Shetland Islands.

Topographic map of Livingston Island, Greenwich, Robert, Snow and Smith Islands.

Smirnenski Point (Bulgarian: нос Смирненски, ‘Nos Smirnenski’ \'nos 'smir-nen-ski\) is a narrow, ice-free point on the east coast of Robert Island projecting 1.1 km into Nelson Strait in the South Shetland Islands, Antarctica, and forming the northwest side of the entrance to Garnya Cove.

It is situated 1.2 km northwest of Perelik Point, 4.4 km north-northwest of Batuliya Point, 1.42 km east of Treklyano Island, 4.7 km east of Ugarchin Point and 8.11 km southeast of Newell Point. Bulgarian early mapping in 2009.

The feature is named after the Bulgarian poet Hristo Smirnenski (1898–1923).

== Maps ==
- L.L. Ivanov. Antarctica: Livingston Island and Greenwich, Robert, Snow and Smith Islands. Scale 1:120000 topographic map. Troyan: Manfred Wörner Foundation, 2009. ISBN 978-954-92032-6-4
