= Vihren Peak =

Peak in the South Shetland Islands, Antarctica

Location of Tangra Mountains on Livingston Island in the South Shetland Islands.

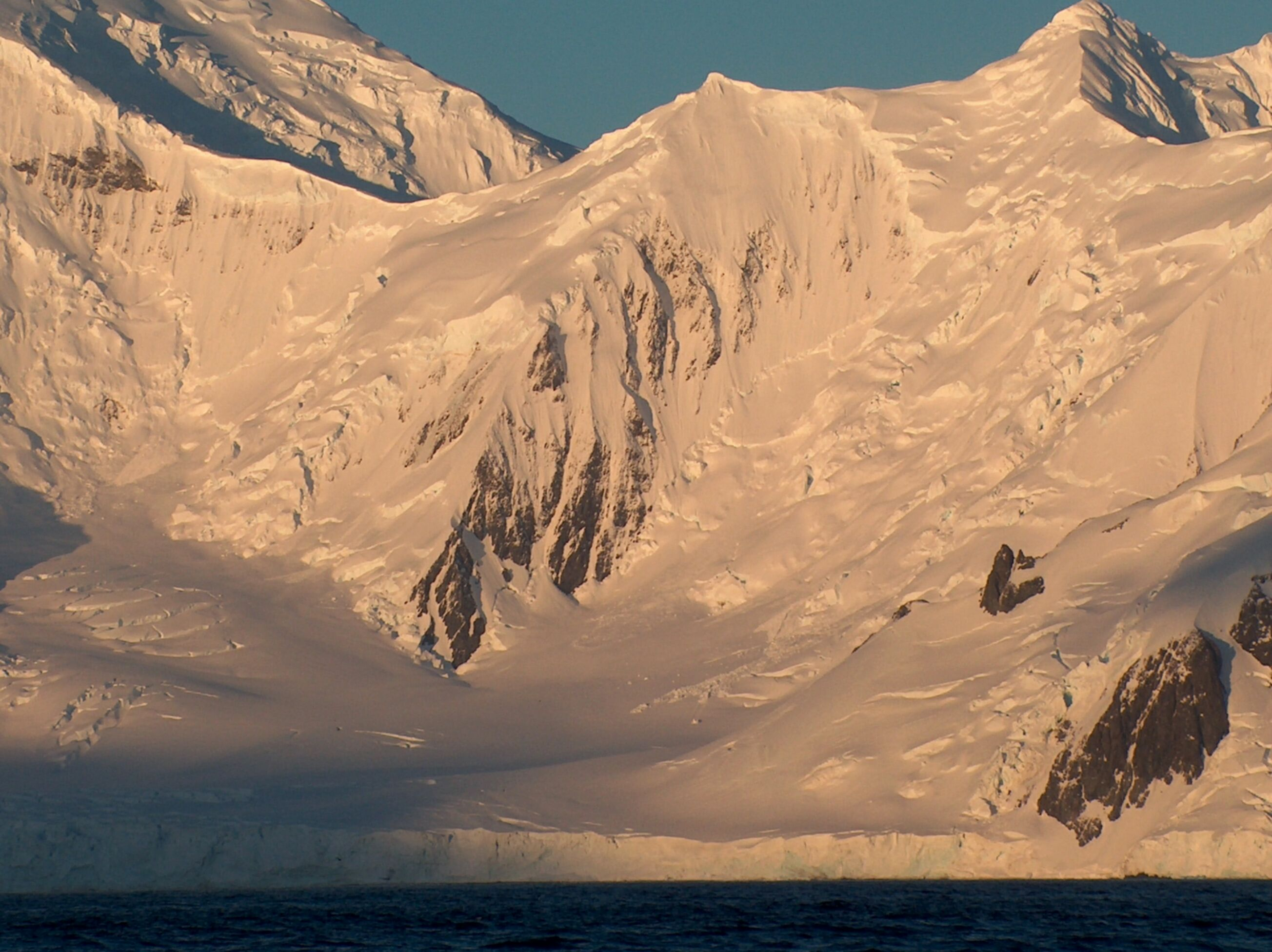
Vihren Peak from Bransfield Strait, with Vitosha Saddle to the left and Magura Glacier in the foreground.

Topographic map of Livingston Island and Smith Island.

Vihren Peak is a sharp peak rising to about 1150 m in Levski Ridge of the Tangra Mountains, eastern Livingston Island in the South Shetland Islands, Antarctica overlooking Devnya Valley and Huron Glacier to the north-northwest, and Magura Glacier to the southeast.

The feature is named after the homonymous summit of the Pirin Mountains in Bulgaria.

== Location ==
The peak is located at 62°39′36″S 60°01′40″W, which is next northeast of Vitosha Saddle, 1.73 km northeast of Great Needle Peak (Falsa Aguja Peak), 490 m south-southwest of Helmet Peak, and 2.2 km north of Radichkov Peak (Bulgarian topographic survey Tangra 2004/05 and mapping in 2005 and 2009).

== Maps ==
- L.L. Ivanov et al. Antarctica: Livingston Island and Greenwich Island, South Shetland Islands. Scale 1:100000 topographic map. Sofia: Antarctic Place-names Commission of Bulgaria, 2005.
- L.L. Ivanov. Antarctica: Livingston Island and Greenwich, Robert, Snow and Smith Islands. Scale 1:120000 topographic map. Troyan: Manfred Wörner Foundation, 2009. ISBN 978-954-92032-6-4
- A. Kamburov and L. Ivanov. Bowles Ridge and Central Tangra Mountains: Livingston Island, Antarctica. Scale 1:25000 map. Sofia: Manfred Wörner Foundation, 2023. ISBN 978-619-90008-6-1
