= Vitosha Saddle =

Saddle in South Shetland Islands, Antarctica

Location of Tangra Mountains on Livingston Island in the South Shetland Islands.

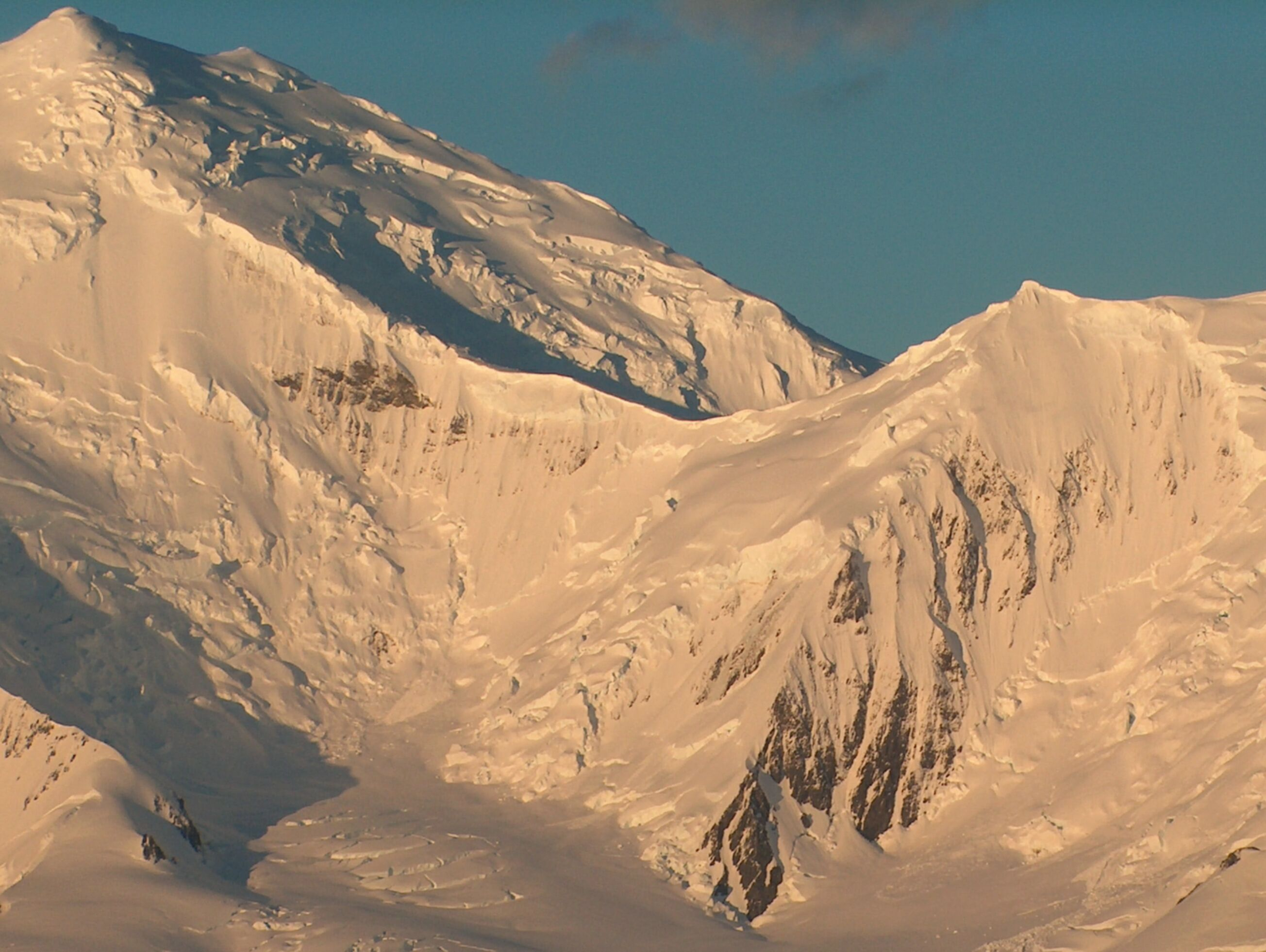
Vitosha Saddle from Bransfield Strait, with Great Needle Peak on the left and Vihren Peak on the right.

Topographic map of Livingston Island and Smith Island.

Vitosha Saddle (Vitoshka Sedlovina \'vi-tosh-ka se-dlo-vi-'na\) is a narrow ice-covered saddle of an elevation 1050 m extending in southwest–northeast direction between Great Needle Peak (Falsa Aguja Peak) and Vihren Peak in the Levski Ridge of Tangra Mountains, eastern Livingston Island in the South Shetland Islands, Antarctica. The saddle is part of the divide between the glacial catchments of Huron Glacier to the north and Magura Glacier to the south.

The feature is named after Vitosha Mountain, Bulgaria.

== Location ==
The saddle's midpoint is located at 62°39′51″S 60°02′25″W, which is 950 m northeast of Great Needle Peak, 1.49 km southeast of Tutrakan Peak, 790 m southwest of Vihren Peak and 3.45 km north-northwest of M'Kean Point.

== Maps ==
- South Shetland Islands. Scale 1:200000 topographic map. DOS 610 Sheet W 62 60. Tolworth, UK, 1968.
- L.L. Ivanov et al. Antarctica: Livingston Island and Greenwich Island, South Shetland Islands. Scale 1:100000 topographic map. Sofia: Antarctic Place-names Commission of Bulgaria, 2005.
- L.L. Ivanov. Antarctica: Livingston Island and Greenwich, Robert, Snow and Smith Islands. Scale 1:120000 topographic map. Troyan: Manfred Wörner Foundation, 2009. ISBN 978-954-92032-6-4
- Antarctic Digital Database (ADD). Scale 1:250000 topographic map of Antarctica. Scientific Committee on Antarctic Research (SCAR). Since 1993, regularly updated.
- L.L. Ivanov. Antarctica: Livingston Island and Smith Island. Scale 1:100000 topographic map. Manfred Wörner Foundation, 2017. ISBN 978-619-90008-3-0
- A. Kamburov and L. Ivanov. Bowles Ridge and Central Tangra Mountains: Livingston Island, Antarctica. Scale 1:25000 map. Sofia: Manfred Wörner Foundation, 2023. ISBN 978-619-90008-6-1
