= Cornwall Island (Antarctica) =

Island in Antarctica

- Location of Robert Island in the South Shetland Islands

- Location within Antarctic Peninsula Location within Antarctica

Geography
- Location: Antarctica
- Coordinates: 62°20′33.4″S 59°42′32.4″W
- Archipelago: South Shetland Islands
- Area: 15 ha (37 acres)

Administration
- Administered under the Antarctic Treaty System

Demographics
- Population: Uninhabited

Cornwall Island is a low ice-free island off the north coast of Robert Island in the South Shetland Islands, Antarctica. Surface area 15 hectares (37 acres). Mónica Rock (62°20′28.4″S 59°44′27″W) is lying 1.65 km (1.03 mi) west of the island and 3.4 km (2.1 mi) north of Passage Rock, 2.84 km (1.76 mi) east of Table Island and 2 km (1.2 mi) south of Potmess Rocks. The area was visited by early 19th century sealers operating from nearby Clothier Harbour.

The island was named in 1935 by the Discovery Investigations after Cornwall House, where the Admiralty Hydrographic Office was situated at that time. Mónica Rock was charted by the 1949-50 Chilean Antarctic Expedition and named after the elder daughter of First Lieutenant Venturini, a member of the expedition.

== Location ==
Cornwall Island is located at 62°20′33.4″S 59°42′32.4″W which is 2.8 km (1.7 mi) north by east of Fort William, Robert Island, 4.2 km (2.6 mi) east of Table Island, 920 m (1,010 yd) south-southwest of Rogozen Island and 2.64 km (1.64 mi) west of Hammer Point, Robert Island (British mapping in 1821, 1822, 1827, 1935, 1968 and 1972, Russian 1831 and 1961, French in 1838, Argentine in 1948 and 1954, Chilean in 1961 and 1971, and Bulgarian in 2009).

== See also ==
- Composite Antarctic Gazetteer
- List of Antarctic islands south of 60° S
- SCAR
- Territorial claims in Antarctica
