= Valchedram Island =

Antarctic island

- Location of Livingston Island in the South Shetland Islands

- Location within Antarctica Location within Antarctic Peninsula

Geography
- Location: Antarctica
- Coordinates: 62°27′03″S 60°48′48″W
- Archipelago: South Shetland Islands

Administration
- Administered under the Antarctic Treaty System

Demographics
- Population: Uninhabited

Topographic map of Livingston Island and Smith Island

Valchedram Island (Bulgarian: остров Вълчедръм, romanized: ostrov Valchedram, IPA: [ˈɔstrov ˈvɤɫt͡ʃɛdrɐm]) is an ice-free island off the north coast of Livingston Island in the South Shetland Islands, Antarctica extending 280 m (310 yd) in southeast-northwest direction. The feature is named after the town of Valchedram in northwestern Bulgaria.

== Location ==
The island is located 1.55 km (0.96 mi) northwest of Cape Shirreff and 2.2 km (1.4 mi) north-northeast of San Telmo Island (British early mapping in 1822, Chilean in 1971, Argentine in 1980, and Bulgarian in 2009.

== See also ==
- Composite Antarctic Gazetteer
- List of Antarctic islands south of 60° S
- SCAR
- Territorial claims in Antarctica

== Maps ==
- L.L. Ivanov. Antarctica: Livingston Island and Greenwich, Robert, Snow and Smith Islands. Scale 1:120000 topographic map. Troyan: Manfred Wörner Foundation, 2010. ISBN 978-954-92032-9-5 (First edition 2009. ISBN 978-954-92032-6-4)
- Antarctic Digital Database (ADD). Scale 1:250000 topographic map of Antarctica. Scientific Committee on Antarctic Research (SCAR). Since 1993, regularly upgraded and updated.
- L.L. Ivanov. Antarctica: Livingston Island and Smith Island. Scale 1:100000 topographic map. Manfred Wörner Foundation, 2017. ISBN 978-619-90008-3-0
