= Onogur Islands =

Group of nine islands and some islets and rocks in Antarctica

- Location of Robert Island in the Shetland Island

- Location within Antarctica Location within Antarctic Peninsula

Geography
- Location: Antarctica
- Coordinates: 62°21′07″S 59°41′00″W
- Archipelago: South Shetland Islands

Administration
- Administered under the Antarctic Treaty System

Demographics
- Population: Uninhabited

Topographic map of Livingston Island, Greenwich, Robert, Snow and Smith Islands

Onogur Islands (Bulgarian: Оногурски острови, ‘Onogurski ostrovi’ \o-no-'gur-ski 'os-tro-vi\) is the group of nine islands and some islets and rocks adjacent to the northwest coast of Robert Island in the South Shetland Islands, Antarctica. The group is situated between Carlota Cove to the southwest and Clothier Harbour to the northeast, and 700 m (770 yd) southeast of Cornwall Island. Kovach Island and Grod Island, the largest two in the group, have a surface area of 11 hectares (27 acres) and 10 hectares (25 acres) respectively. The area was visited by early 19th century sealers based in Clothier Harbour.

The island group is named after the settlement of Onogur in northeastern Bulgaria in connection with the Onogurs (5th-7th century).

== Islands in the Onogur group ==
The group comprises the following islands:

- Churicheni Island
- Grod Island
- Kovach Island
- Leeve Island
- Oescus Island
- Osenovlag Island
- Redina Island
- Svetulka Island
- Vilare Island

== Location ==
Onogur Islands are centred at 62°21′07″S 59°41′00″W. British mapping in 1822 and 1968, Chilean in 1971, Argentine in 1980, and Bulgarian in 2009.

== Maps ==
- Livingston Island to King George Island. Scale 1:200000. Admiralty Nautical Chart 1776. Taunton: UK Hydrographic Office, 1968.
- L.L. Ivanov. Antarctica: Livingston Island and Greenwich, Robert, Snow and Smith Islands. Scale 1:120000 topographic map. Troyan: Manfred Wörner Foundation, 2010. ISBN 978-954-92032-9-5 (First edition 2009. ISBN 978-954-92032-6-4)
- Antarctic Digital Database (ADD). Scale 1:250000 topographic map of Antarctica. Scientific Committee on Antarctic Research (SCAR). Since 1993, regularly upgraded and updated.
- L.L. Ivanov. Antarctica: Livingston Island and Smith Island. Scale 1:100000 topographic map. Manfred Wörner Foundation, 2017. ISBN 978-619-90008-3-0

== See also ==
- Composite Antarctic Gazetteer
- List of Antarctic islands south of 60° S
- SCAR
- Territorial claims in Antarctica
