= Hammer Point =

Location of Robert Island in the South Shetland Islands.

Topographic map of Livingston Island, Greenwich, Robert, Snow and Smith Islands.

Hammer Point is a rocky point projecting from the north coast of Robert Island in the South Shetland Islands, Antarctica into Drake Passage, and forming the southwest side of the entrance to Nevestino Cove and the northeast side of the entrance to Clothier Harbour. The point forms the north extremity of the minor Boatin Island connected to Robert Island on the south by a 250 m-long (820 ft) moraine tombolo. The area was visited by early 19th century sealers operating from Clothier Harbour.

The feature is descriptively named from its shape.

== Location ==
The point is located at 62°20′23.2″S 59°39′06.4″W which is 2.08 km southwest of Catharina Point, 6.79 km west by north of Newell Point, 5.17 km northeast of Fort William and 2.24 km southeast of Heywood Island (Chilean mapping in 1962 and 1971, British in 1968, and Bulgarian in 2009).

== Maps ==
- L.L. Ivanov. Antarctica: Livingston Island and Greenwich, Robert, Snow and Smith Islands. Scale 1:120000 topographic map. Troyan: Manfred Wörner Foundation, 2009. ISBN 978-954-92032-6-4
