= Misnomer Point =

Geographic formation in Antarctica

Location of Robert Island in the South Shetland Islands.

Topographic map of Livingston Island, Greenwich, Robert, Snow and Smith Islands.

Misnomer Point is the ice-free tipped point projecting 400 m westwards from the northwest coast of Alfatar Peninsula, Robert Island in the South Shetland Islands, Antarctica and forming the east side of the entrance to Carlota Cove. The area was visited by early 19th century sealers operating from Clothier Harbour.

The feature is named in reference to a previous misnaming when it was identified incorrectly on charts as 'Cornwall Point', a variant form of the name originally given to nearby Cornwall Island.

== Location ==
The point is located at 62°21′58″S 59°41′24″W which is 1.9 km east-northeast of Fort William, 2.7 km south-southeast of Cornwall Island, 900 m south of Onogur Islands, 3.55 km south-southwest of Hammer Point and 3.23 km north-northwest of Debelyanov Point (British mapping in 1935, 1948, 1967 and 1968, Argentine in 1957, and Bulgarian in 2009).

== See also ==
- Alfatar Peninsula
- Robert Island

== Map ==
- L.L. Ivanov. Antarctica: Livingston Island and Greenwich, Robert, Snow and Smith Islands. Scale 1:120000 topographic map. Troyan: Manfred Wörner Foundation, 2009. ISBN 978-954-92032-6-4
