= Shipot Point =

Location of Robert Island in the South Shetland Islands.

Topographic map of Livingston Island, Greenwich, Robert, Snow and Smith Islands.

Shipot Point (Bulgarian: нос Шипот, ‘Nos Shipot’ \'nos 'shi-pot\) is the ice-free point on the northwest coast of Robert Island in the South Shetland Islands projecting 630 m northwards, and together with Osenovlag Island and Svetulka Island forming the southwest side of Clothier Harbour. The area was visited by early 19th century sealers.

The point is named after the settlement of Shipot in Northwestern Bulgaria.

== Location ==
Shipot Point is located at 62°21′01.6″S 59°40′13″W, which is 3.63 km northeast of Fort William Point and 1.36 km southwest of Hammer Point. Bulgarian mapping in 2009.

== Maps ==
- Livingston Island to King George Island. Scale 1:200000. Admiralty Nautical Chart 1776. Taunton: UK Hydrographic Office, 1968.
- L.L. Ivanov. Antarctica: Livingston Island and Greenwich, Robert, Snow and Smith Islands. Scale 1:120000 topographic map. Troyan: Manfred Wörner Foundation, 2009. ISBN 978-954-92032-6-4 (Second edition 2010, ISBN 978-954-92032-9-5)
- Antarctic Digital Database (ADD). Scale 1:250000 topographic map of Antarctica. Scientific Committee on Antarctic Research (SCAR), 1993–2016.
