= Newell Point =

Location of Robert Island in the South Shetland Islands.

Topographic map of Livingston Island, Greenwich, Robert, Snow and Smith Islands.

Newell Point is the rocky point forming the northeast extremity of Robert Island in the South Shetland Islands, Antarctica and is a northwest entrance point of Nelson Strait.

The feature originally charted and named 'Newell Point' by Discovery Investigations personnel in 1935 was probably the north extremity of the nearby Tatul Island, the latter only becoming detached from Robert Island as a result of glacier retreat in the late 20th and early 21st century.

== Location ==
The point is located at 62°20′13.5″S 59°31′14″W which is 5.27 km east-southeast of Catharina Point, 2.7 km east of Lavrenov Point, 950 m east-southeast of Tatul Island, 1.07 km south-southeast of Lientur Rocks, 3.85 km southwest of Liberty Rocks, 14.8 km west-southwest of Harmony Point, Nelson Island, 10.67 km northwest of Kitchen Point, 8.11 km northwest of Smirnenski Point and 4.22 km northwest of Ugarchin Point. Bulgarian mapping in 2009.

== See also ==
- Robert Island
- South Shetland Islands

== Maps ==
- L.L. Ivanov. Antarctica: Livingston Island and Greenwich, Robert, Snow and Smith Islands. Scale 1:120000 topographic map. Troyan: Manfred Wörner Foundation, 2009. ISBN 978-954-92032-6-4
