= Nelson Strait (South Shetland Islands) =

Sea passage between Robert and Nelson Islands in South Shetland, Antarctica

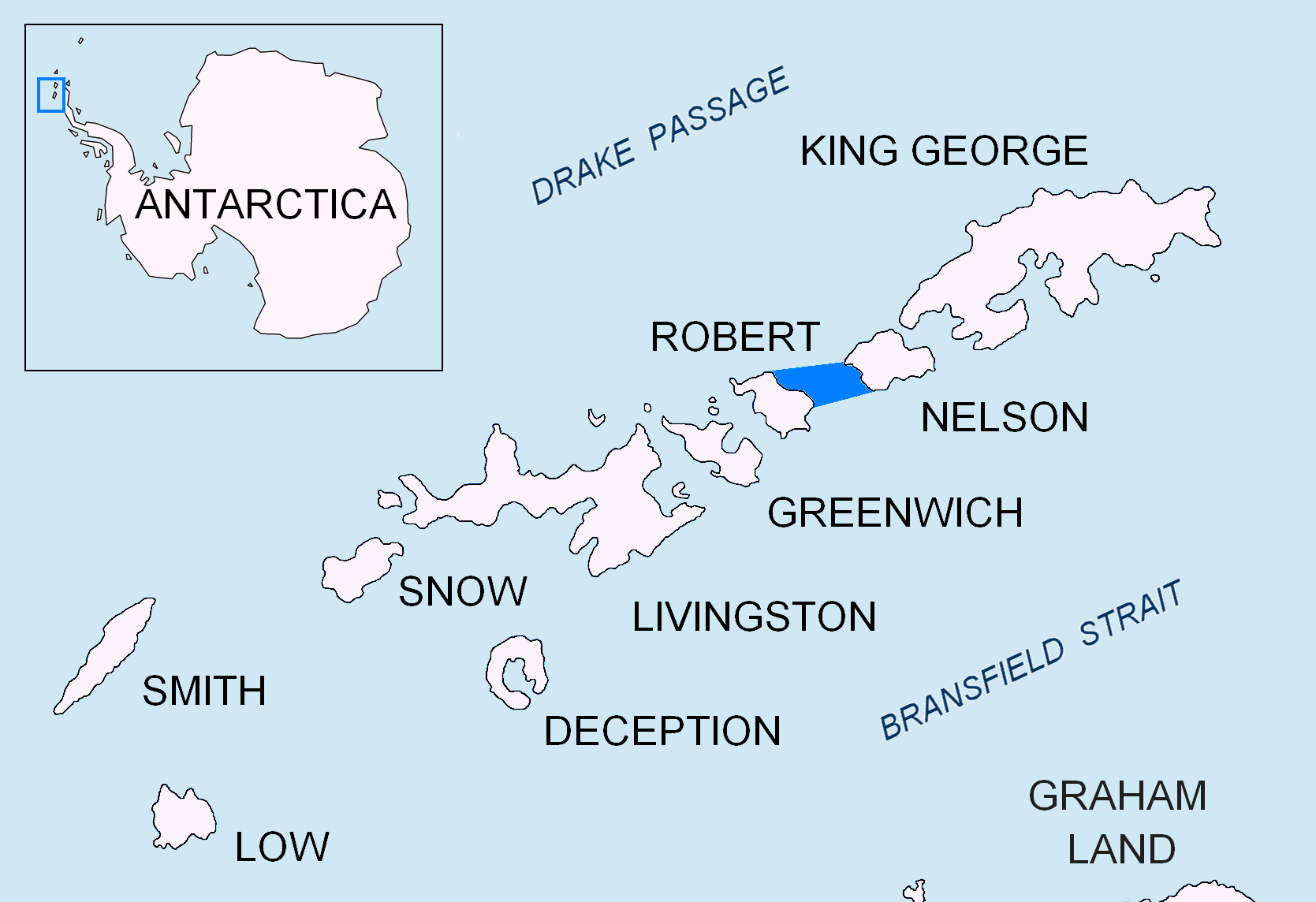
Location of Nelson Strait in the South Shetland Islands.

Nelson Strait is the 9 km long and 9.8 km wide strait lying between Robert Island and Nelson Island in the South Shetland Islands, Antarctica. The strait was explored by early 19th century sealers and first charted by Nathaniel Palmer in 1821. While it had a variety of different names in the past (‘Harmony Strait’, ‘King George’s Strait’, ‘Parry’s Straits’, Davis's Straits’, ‘Détroit de Clothier’ etc.), the present name — probably taken from the adjacent Nelson Island — has become well established in international usage.

== Location ==
The strait is centred at (62°21′00″S 59°17′00″W) (early American and British mapping in 1821, British mapping in 1968, Argentine in 1946 and 1980, Chilean in 1951 and 1971, and Bulgarian mapping of the western part in 2009).

== Maps ==
Topographic map of Livingston Island, Greenwich, Robert, Snow and Smith Islands.

- Chart of South Shetland including Coronation Island, &c. from the exploration of the sloop Dove in the years 1821 and 1822 by George Powell Commander of the same. Scale ca. 1:200000. London: Laurie, 1822.
- L.L. Ivanov. Antarctica: Livingston Island and Greenwich, Robert, Snow and Smith Islands. Scale 1:120000 topographic map. Troyan: Manfred Wörner Foundation, 2010. ISBN 978-954-92032-9-5 (First edition 2009. ISBN 978-954-92032-6-4)

== See also ==
- Nelson Strait (Chile)
