= Clothier Harbour =

Bay in Antarctica

Location of Robert Island in the South Shetland Islands.

Topographic map of Livingston Island, Greenwich, Robert, Snow and Smith Islands.

Clothier Harbour is the 1.5 km wide bay indenting for 1 km the north coast of Robert Island in the South Shetland Islands, Antarctica between Hammer Point on the northeast and Onogur Islands on the southwest. The harbour was used as a safe base by American sealing ships in 1820–21.

The bay was discovered, charted and named by American sealers after the vessel Clothier under Captain Clark, which sank there in December 1820.

== Location ==
The harbour's midpoint is located at 62°20′47″S 59°39′40″W (British mapping in 1821, 1822 and 1968, Argentine in 1949, Chilean in 1962, and Bulgarian in 2009).

== See also ==
- Robert Island
- South Shetland Islands

== Map ==
- L.L. Ivanov. Antarctica: Livingston Island and Greenwich, Robert, Snow and Smith Islands. Scale 1:120000 topographic map. Troyan: Manfred Wörner Foundation, 2010. ISBN 978-954-92032-9-5 (First edition 2009. ISBN 978-954-92032-6-4)
