= Robert Island =

Island of the South Shetland Islands in the Southern Ocean

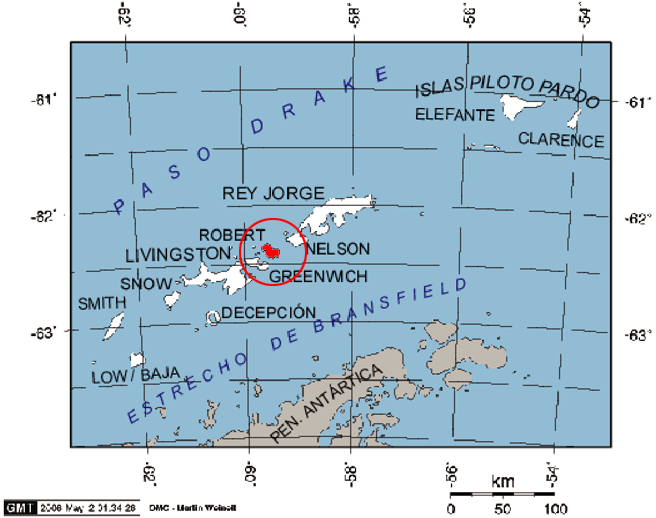
- Location of Robert Island in the South Shetland Islands

- Location within South Shetland Islands Location within Antarctica

Geography
- Location: Antarctica
- Coordinates: 62°24′S 59°30′W
- Archipelago: South Shetland Islands
- Area: 132 km^{2} (51 sq mi)
- Length: 11 mi (18 km)
- Width: 8 mi (13 km)

Administration
- Antarctica
- Administered under the Antarctic Treaty System

Demographics
- Population: 0
- Punta Prat Lighthouse
- Foundation: concrete base
- Construction: fiber glass tower
- Height: 7 m (23 ft)
- Shape: cylindrical tower
- Markings: yellow tower with orange horizontal bands
- Power source: solar power
- Focal height: 25 m (82 ft)
- Range: 7 nmi (13 km; 8.1 mi)
- Characteristic: Fl W 10s

Robert Island or Mitchells Island or Polotsk Island or Roberts Island is an island 11 miles (18 km) long and 8 miles (13 km) wide, situated between Nelson Island and Greenwich Island in the South Shetland Islands, Antarctica. Robert Island is located at 62°24′S 59°30′W. Its surface area is 132 km^{2} (51 sq mi). The name "Robert Island" dates back to around 1821 and is now established in international usage.

Much of the Coppermine Peninsula in the west of the island is made up by a perched strandflat surface that was at sea level in the past.

Captain Robert Fildes may have named Robert Island for his brig Robert. Fildes was sealing in the South Shetlands in 1821–1822 until ice destroyed his vessel in March 1822. Fildes Strait is named for him.

Topographic map of Livingston Island, Greenwich, Robert, Snow and Smith Islands

== See also ==
- List of lighthouses in Antarctica
- Clothier Harbor
- Composite Antarctic Gazetteer
- List of Antarctic and sub-Antarctic islands
- List of Antarctic islands south of 60° S
- SCAR
- Territorial claims in Antarctica

== Maps ==
- Chart of South Shetland including Coronation Island, &c. from the exploration of the sloop Dove in the years 1821 and 1822 by George Powell Commander of the same. Scale ca. 1:200000. London: Laurie, 1822.
- South Shetland Islands. Scale 1:200000 topographic map. DOS 610 Sheet W 62 58. Tolworth, UK, 1968.
- L.L. Ivanov et al. Antarctica: Livingston Island and Greenwich Island, South Shetland Islands. Scale 1:100000 topographic map. Sofia: Antarctic Place-names Commission of Bulgaria, 2005.
- L.L. Ivanov. Antarctica: Livingston Island and Greenwich, Robert, Snow and Smith Islands. Scale 1:120000 topographic map. Troyan: Manfred Wörner Foundation, 2009. ISBN 978-954-92032-6-4
- Antarctic Digital Database (ADD). Scale 1:250000 topographic map of Antarctica. Scientific Committee on Antarctic Research (SCAR), 1993–2016.
