= The Triplets (Robert Island) =

Location of Robert Island in the South Shetland Islands.

The Triplets is an ice-free three-pointed hill rising to 160 m (520 ft) at the southwest extremity of Alfatar Peninsula, Robert Island in the South Shetland Islands, Antarctica and surmounting Coppermine Cove to the northwest, Mitchell Cove to the southeast, and English Strait to the west and south. Aconcagua Point 62°23′32.8″S 59°41′08.8″W is formed by an offshoot of the hill.

The Triplets were charted and descriptively named by Discovery Investigations personnel in 1935. Aconcagua Point was named by the 1948-49 Chilean Antarctic Expedition after the province of Aconcagua, Chile.

== Location ==
The hill is located at 62°23′29″S 59°40′58″W which is 3.15 km (1.96 mi) southeast of Fort William, 750 m (2,460 ft) west-northwest of Debelyanov Point, 3.55 km (2.21 mi) northwest of Negra Point, 6.22 km (3.86 mi) north-northeast of Spark Point, Greenwich Island, 3.13 km (1.94 mi) east-northeast of Barrientos Island, Aitcho Islands and 4.1 km (2.5 mi) east-southeast of Bilyana Island, Aitcho Islands (British mapping in 1935, 1942, 1962 and 1968, Argentine 1948 and 1953, Chilean in 1961 and 1974, and Bulgarian in 2009).

== See also ==
- Alfatar Peninsula
- Robert Island

== Map ==
- L.L. Ivanov. Antarctica: Livingston Island and Greenwich, Robert, Snow and Smith Islands. Scale 1:120000 topographic map. Troyan: Manfred Wörner Foundation, 2009. ISBN 978-954-92032-6-4
