= Chaos Reef =

Shoal in the South Shetland Islands, Antarctica

- Location within Antarctica Location within Antarctic Peninsula

Geography
- Location: Antarctica
- Coordinates: 62°21′50.6″S 59°46′11″W
- Archipelago: South Shetland Islands

Administration
- Antarctica
- Administered under the Antarctic Treaty System

Demographics
- Population: uninhabited

Topographic map of Livingston, Greenwich, Robert, Snow and Smith Islands

Chaos Reef is an area of breakers and turbulent water created by a series of underwater shoals in the north extremity of the Aitcho Islands group on the west side of English Strait in the South Shetland Islands, Antarctica. The area was visited by early 19th-century sealers operating from nearby Clothier Harbour. Following a survey by the 1949 Chilean Antarctic Expedition, the feature was resurveyed and descriptively named from HMS Protector in 1967.

== Location ==
Chaos Reef is located at 62°21′50.6″S 59°46′11″W which is 970 m (1,061 yd) north-northwest from the midpoint of the Okol Rocks, 1.13 km (0.70 mi) north-northeast of Kilifarevo Island, 1.48 km (0.92 mi) east-northeast of Morris Rock, 1.26 km (0.78 mi) southeast of Turmoil Rock, 3.96 km (2.46 mi) southwest of Cornwall Island, and 2.45 km (1.52 mi) west-northwest of Fort William on Robert Island (as determined by Chilean surveys in 1949–1950 and 1971; British in 1968, 1972 and 1990; and Bulgarian in 2009).

== See also ==
- Composite Antarctic Gazetteer
- List of Antarctic and sub-Antarctic islands
- List of Antarctic islands south of 60° S
- SCAR
- Territorial claims in Antarctica

== Maps ==
- L.L. Ivanov. Antarctica: Livingston Island and Greenwich, Robert, Snow and Smith Islands. Scale 1:120000 topographic map. Troyan: Manfred Wörner Foundation, 2009. ISBN 978-954-92032-6-4
