= Risopatrón Base =

Risopatrón Station
- Antarctic base
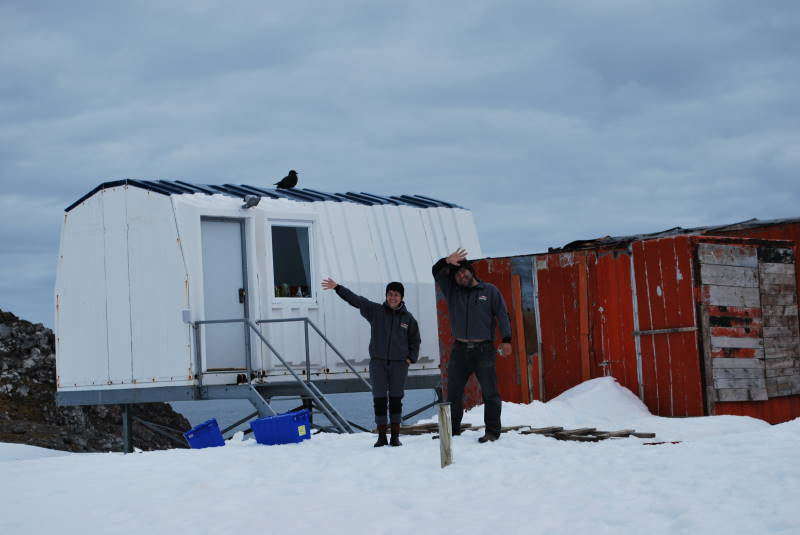

- Location of Risopatrón Station in Antarctica
- Coordinates: 62°22′42″S 59°42′03″W
- Country: Chile
- Location in Antarctica: Robert Island; South Shetland Islands; Antarctica
- Administered by: Instituto Antártico Chileno INACH
- Established: 20 March 1949
- Elevation: 15 m (49 ft)

Population (2017)
  - Summer: 6
  - Winter: 0
- Type: Seasonal
- Period: Summer
- Status: Operational
- Activities: List: Geology; Glaciology; Meteorology; Biology
- Website: Refugio Luis Risopatrón INACH

Topographic map of Livingston Island, Greenwich, Robert, Snow and Smith Islands

Robert Island, shaded red, within the South Shetland Islands

Risopatrón Base, also Luis Risopatrón Base, is a small Chilean Antarctic research base in the northwest of Robert Island in the South Shetland Islands, Antarctica situated on the isthmus linking Coppermine Peninsula to Alfatar Peninsula and bounded by Carlota Cove to the north and Coppermine Cove to the south. Established as a refuge in 1949 and opened as a base in 1954, the facility supports summer research in geology, geophysics and terrestrial biology.

The base is named after the Chilean geographer Luis Risopatrón (1869–1930) who compiled and published a comprehensive geographical dictionary of Chile in 1924.

== Location ==
The base is located at 62°22′42.4″S 59°42′02.5″W which is 1.61 km southeast of Fort William, 1.63 km north-northwest of The Triplets, 11.3 km north by west of Arturo Prat Base and 8.16 km north-northeast of Maldonado Base (Bulgarian mapping in 2009.)

== See also ==
- List of Antarctic research stations
- List of Antarctic field camps

== Maps ==
- L.L. Ivanov. Antarctica: Livingston Island and Greenwich, Robert, Snow and Smith Islands. Scale 1:120000 topographic map. Troyan: Manfred Wörner Foundation, 2010. ISBN 978-954-92032-9-5 (First edition 2009. ISBN 978-954-92032-6-4)
- Media related to Luis Risopatrón Station at Wikimedia Commons
