= Klimash Passage =

Strait in the South Shetland Islands

Location of Greenwich Island in the South Shetland Islands.

Topographic map of Livingston Island, Greenwich, Robert, Snow and Smith Islands.

Klimash Passage (Bulgarian: проток Климаш, ‘Protok Klimash’ \'pro-tok 'kli-mash\) is the 1.9 km wide passage in the South Shetland Islands between Table Island and Bowler Rocks on the northwest and Morris Rock and Chaos Reef, Aitcho Islands to the SE. The area was visited by early 19th century sealers.

The passage is named after the settlement of Klimash in Southeastern Bulgaria.

== Location ==
Klimash Passage is located at 62°21′25″S 59°47′50″W. British mapping in 1968 and Bulgarian mapping in 2009.

== Maps ==
- Livingston Island to King George Island. Scale 1:200000. Admiralty Nautical Chart 1776. Taunton: UK Hydrographic Office, 1968.
- L.L. Ivanov. Antarctica: Livingston Island and Greenwich, Robert, Snow and Smith Islands. Scale 1:120000 topographic map. Troyan: Manfred Wörner Foundation, 2009. ISBN 978-954-92032-6-4 (Second edition 2010, ISBN 978-954-92032-9-5)
- Antarctic Digital Database (ADD). Scale 1:250000 topographic map of Antarctica. Scientific Committee on Antarctic Research (SCAR). Since 1993, regularly upgraded and updated.
