= Bowler Rocks =

Rock formation in the South Shetland Islands

- Location of Greenwich Island in the South Shetland Islands

- Location within Antarctic Peninsula Location within Antarctica

Geography
- Location: Antarctica
- Coordinates: 62°21′19.1″S 59°49′36.1″W
- Archipelago: South Shetland Islands
- Length: 1 km (0.6 mi)

Administration
- Antarctica
- Administered under the Antarctic Treaty System

Demographics
- Population: uninhabited

Bowler Rocks is a group of rocks off the north coast of Greenwich Island in the South Shetland Islands, Antarctica. They lie southwest of Table Island and northwest of Aitcho Islands, and extending 1 km (0.62 mi) in east-west direction.

The area was visited by early 19th-century sealers. The feature is named after David Michael Bowler, surveying recorder aboard the launch Nimrod during the Royal Navy hydrographic survey of the rocks in 1967.

== Location ==
The midpoint is located at which is 1.1 km (0.68 mi) southwest of Table Island, 2.15 km (1.34 mi) northwest of Morris Rock, 3.1 km (1.9 mi) north of Holmes Rock and 5.3 km (3.3 mi) northeast of Romeo Island (Argentine mapping in 1949, 1953 and 1980, British in 1968 and 1974, Chilean in 1971, and Bulgarian in 2009).

== See also ==
- Composite Antarctic Gazetteer
- Greenwich Island
- List of Antarctic islands south of 60° S
- SCAR
- Territorial claims in Antarctica

== Maps ==
- L.L. Ivanov. Antarctica: Livingston Island and Greenwich, Robert, Snow and Smith Islands. Scale 1:120000 topographic map. Troyan: Manfred Wörner Foundation, 2009. ISBN 978-954-92032-6-4
