= Nikudin Rock =

Rock in Antarctica

- Location of Greenwich Island in the South Shetland Islands

- Location within Antarctica Location within Antarctic Peninsula

Geography
- Location: Antarctica
- Coordinates: 62°23′01.7″S 59°50′33″W
- Archipelago: South Shetland Islands

Administration
- Administered under the Antarctic Treaty System

Demographics
- Population: Uninhabited

Nikudin Rock (Bulgarian: скала Никудин, ‘Skala Nikudin’ \ska-'la ni-ku-'din\) is the high, round rock of diameter 180 m and split in northeast-southwest direction, lying off the north coast of Greenwich Island in the South Shetland Islands. The area was visited by early 19th century sealers.

The rock is named after the settlement of Nikudin in Southwestern Bulgaria.

== Location ==
Nikudin Rock is located at 62°23′01.7″S 59°50′33″W, which is 2.25 km west-northwest of Emeline Island, 1.3 km north by east of Stoker Island and 4 km east-southeast of Romeo Island, and is separated from neighbouring Holmes Rock to the east-northeast by a 150 m wide passage. British mapping in 1968 and Bulgarian mapping in 2009.

== Maps ==
- Livingston Island to King George Island. Scale 1:200000. Admiralty Nautical Chart 1776. Taunton: UK Hydrographic Office, 1968.
- L.L. Ivanov. Antarctica: Livingston Island and Greenwich, Robert, Snow and Smith Islands. Scale 1:120000 topographic map. Troyan: Manfred Wörner Foundation, 2009. ISBN 978-954-92032-6-4 (Second edition 2010, ISBN 978-954-92032-9-5)
- Antarctic Digital Database (ADD). Scale 1:250000 topographic map of Antarctica. Scientific Committee on Antarctic Research (SCAR). Since 1993, regularly upgraded and updated.
