= Jorge Island =

Island in the South Shetland Islands, Antarctica

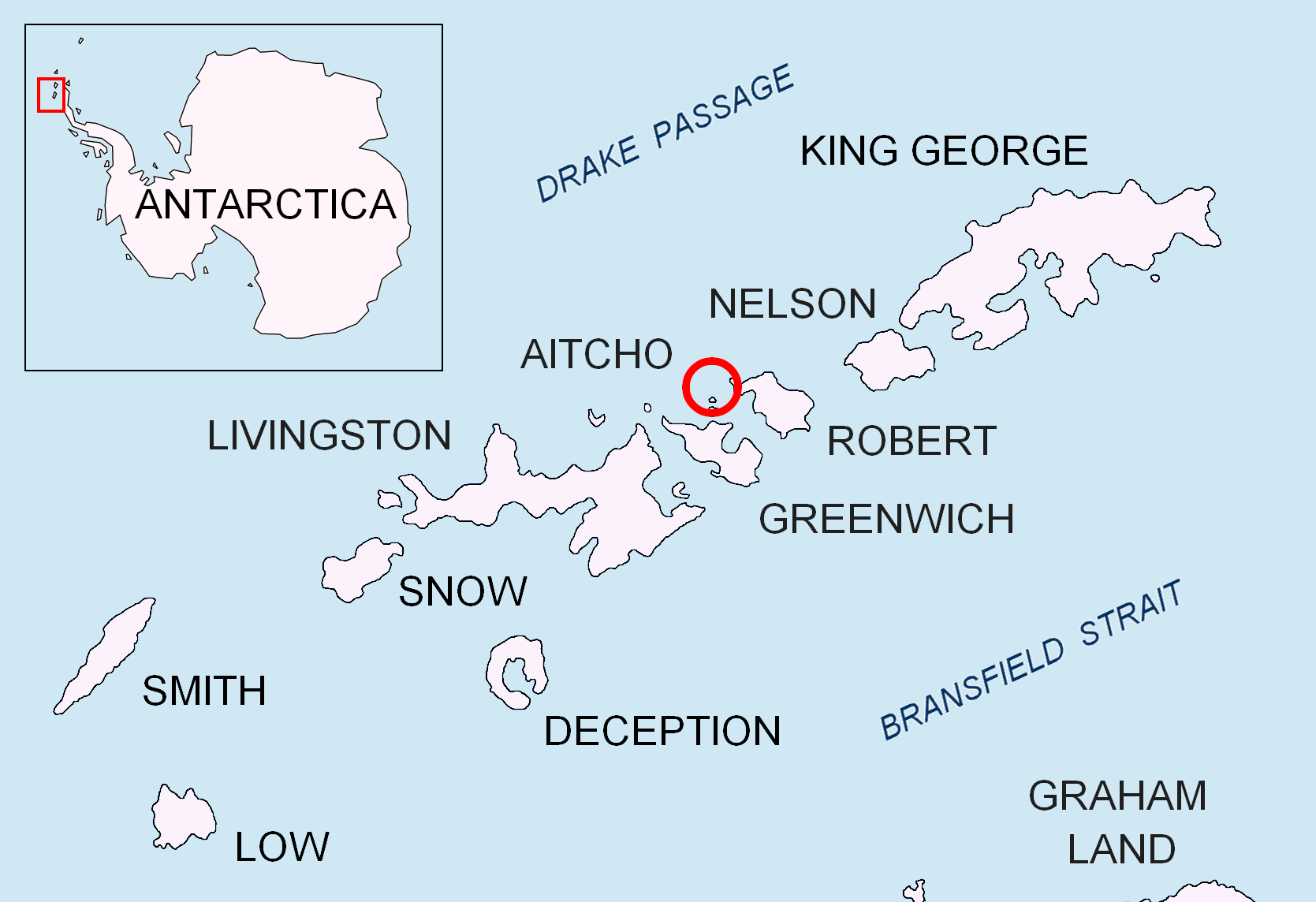
- Location of Jorge Island in the South Shetland Islands

- Location within Antarctic Peninsula Location within Antarctica

Geography
- Location: Antarctica
- Coordinates: 62°22′47.1″S 59°45′38.5″W
- Archipelago: Aitcho group
- Area: 13 ha (32 acres)
- Length: 0.42 km (0.261 mi)
- Width: 0.3 km (0.19 mi)

Administration
- Administered under the Antarctic Treaty System

Demographics
- Population: Uninhabited

Jorge Island is an ice-free island in the Aitcho group on the west side of English Strait in the South Shetland Islands, Antarctica. Extending 420 by 300 m (460 by 330 yd), surface area 13 hectares (32 acres). The area was visited by early 19th century sealers.

The feature was named by the Chilean Antarctic Expedition in 1949 after the son of Captain José Duarte, commanding the patrol ship Lautaro.

== Location ==
The midpoint is located 2.4 km (1.5 mi) north-northwest of Barrientos Island, 100 m (110 yd) north of Bilyana Island, 500 m (550 yd) east-northeast of Riksa Islands, 600 m (660 yd) south of Okol Rocks and 1.96 km (1.22 mi) west-southwest of Fort William, Robert Island (Chilean mapping in 1961, British in 1968, Argentine in 1980, and Bulgarian in 2005 and 2009).

== See also ==
- Aitcho Islands
- Composite Antarctic Gazetteer
- List of Antarctic islands south of 60° S
- SCAR
- South Shetland Islands
- Territorial claims in Antarctica

== Map ==
- L.L. Ivanov et al. Antarctica: Livingston Island and Greenwich Island, South Shetland Islands. Scale 1:100000 topographic map. Sofia: Antarctic Place-names Commission of Bulgaria, 2005.
