= Emeline Island =

Island in the South Shetland Islands, Antarctica

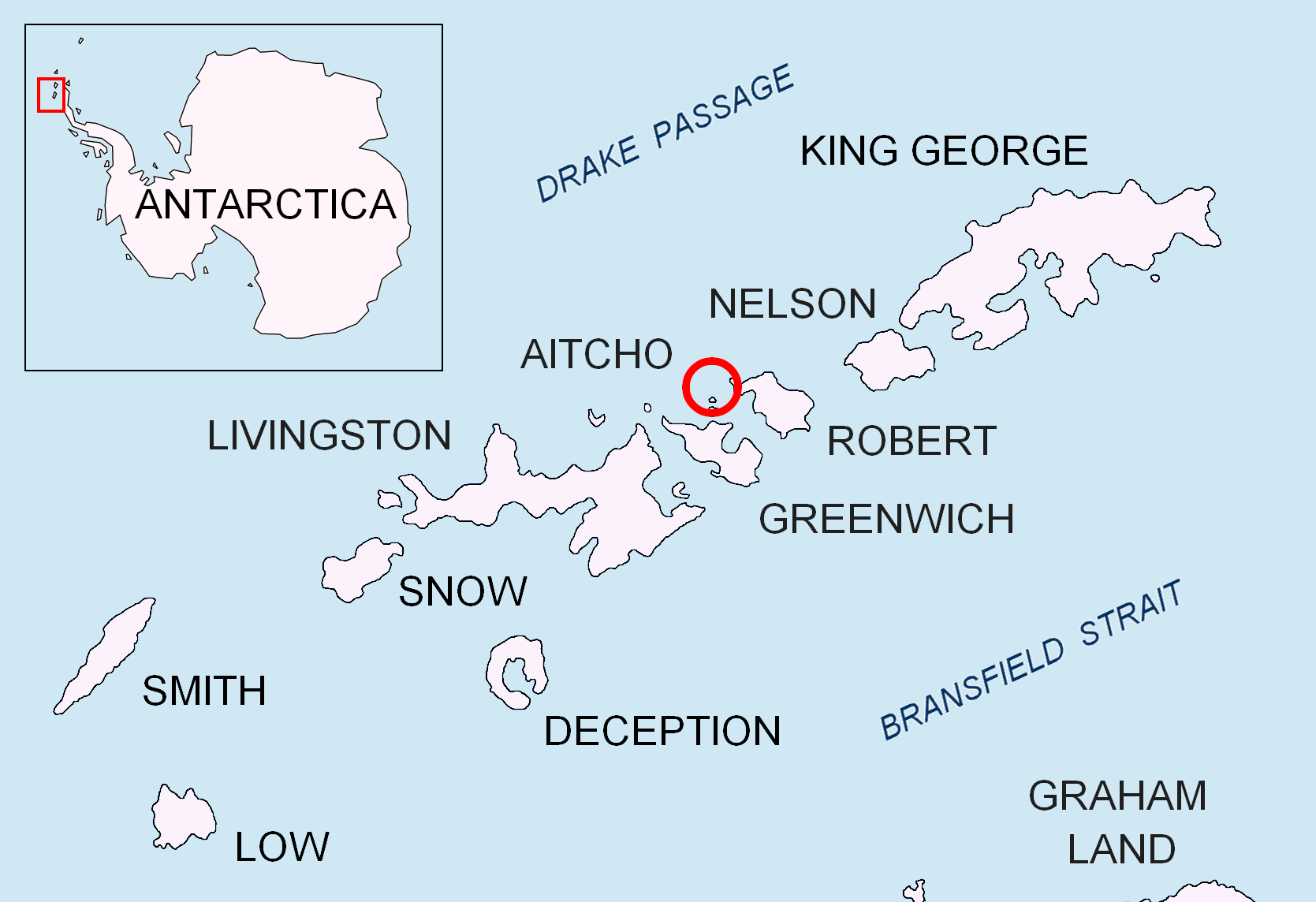
- Location of Emeline Island in the South Shetland Islands

- Location within Antarctic Peninsula Location within Antarctica

Geography
- Location: Antarctica
- Coordinates: 62°24′S 59°48′W
- Archipelago: Aitcho group
- Area: 18 ha (44 acres)
- Length: 0.55 km (0.342 mi)
- Width: 0.32 km (0.199 mi)
- Highest elevation: 100.0 m (328.1 ft)

Administration
- Administered under the Antarctic Treaty System

Demographics
- Population: Uninhabited

Topographic map of Livingston Island, Greenwich, Robert, Snow and Smith Islands.

Emeline Island is a conspicuous rocky island rising to over 100 m (328 ft) in the Aitcho group on the west side of English Strait in the South Shetland Islands, Antarctica. The island extends 550 by 320 m (600 by 350 yd) with a surface area of 18 hectares (44 acres). The area was visited by early 19th century seal hunters.

The feature is named after the American sealing vessel Emeline under Captain Jeremiah Holmes, which visited the South Shetlands in 1820–21 and operated from nearby Clothier Harbour.

== Location ==
The midpoint is located at 62°23′29.3″S 59°47′35″W and the island lies 650 m (710 yd) northwest of Pasarel Island, 1.8 km (1.1 mi) northwest of Barrientos Island, 2.63 km (1.63 mi) north of Dee Island, 1.7 km (1.1 mi) north-northeast of Sierra Island, 2.45 km (1.52 mi) east by north of Stoker Island, 2 km (1.2 mi) east-southeast of Holmes Rock, 1.45 km (0.90 mi) southwest of Bilyana Island and 650 m (710 yd) southwest of Riksa Islands.

== See also ==
- Aitcho Islands
- Composite Antarctic Gazetteer
- List of Antarctic islands south of 60° S
- SCAR
- South Shetland Islands
- Territorial claims in Antarctica

== Map ==
- L.L. Ivanov et al. Antarctica: Livingston Island and Greenwich Island, South Shetland Islands. Scale 1:100000 topographic map. Sofia: Antarctic Place-names Commission of Bulgaria, 2005.
