= Pasarel Island =

Island in the South Shetland Islands, Antarctica

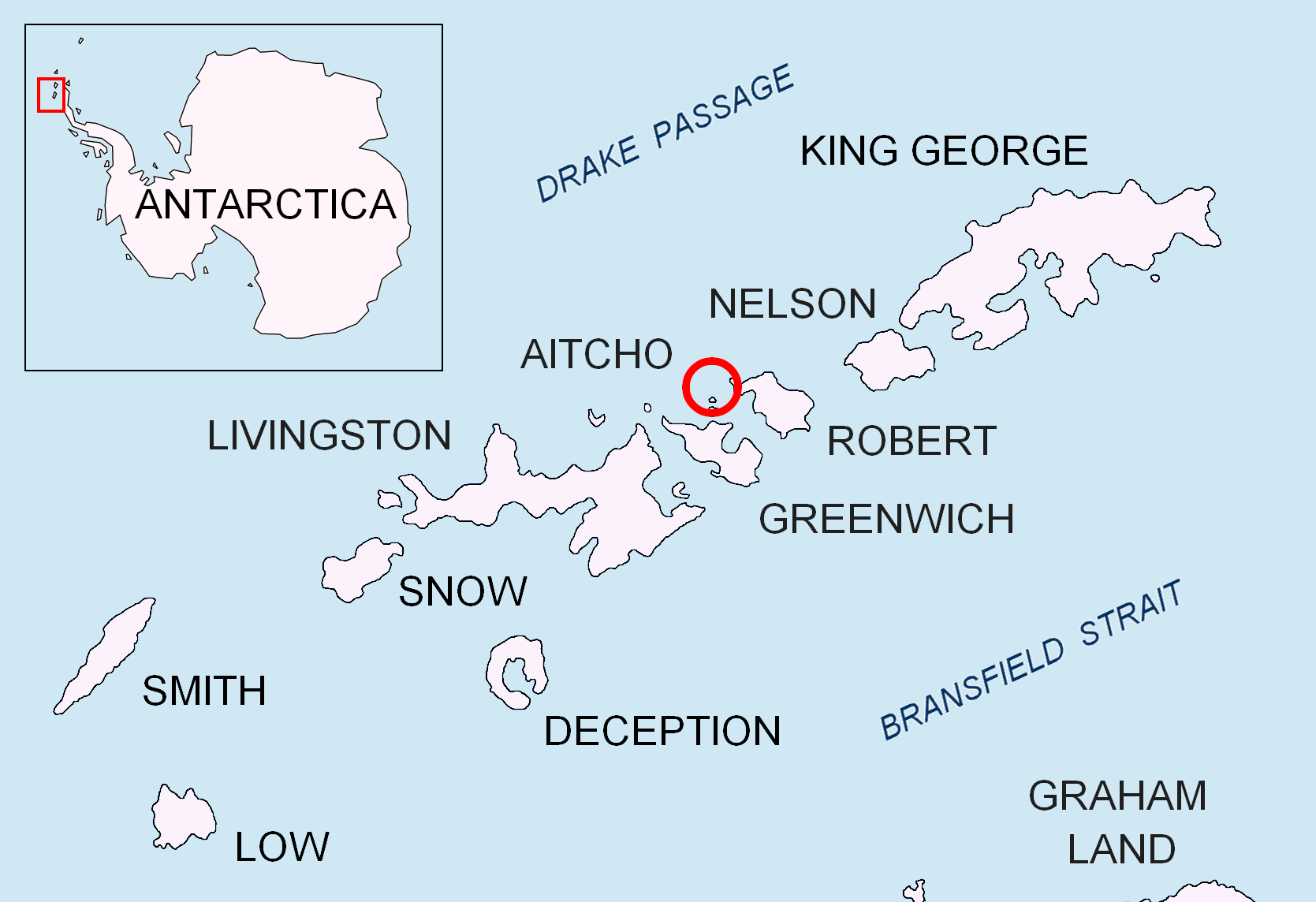
- Location of Aitcho Islands in the South Shetland Islands.

- Location within Antarctica Location within Antarctic Peninsula

Geography
- Location: Antarctica
- Coordinates: 62°23′50″S 59°46′30″W
- Archipelago: Aitcho group
- Length: 0.45 km (0.28 mi)
- Width: 0.26 km (0.162 mi)

Administration
- Administered under the Antarctic Treaty System

Demographics
- Population: Uninhabited

Pasarel Island (Bulgarian: остров Пасарел, romanized: ostrov Pasarel, IPA: [ˈɔstrof pɐsɐˈrɛɫ]) is an ice-free island in the Aitcho group on the west side of English Strait in the South Shetland Islands, Antarctica. The island is situated 900 m (980 yd) northwest of Barrientos Island, 1.35 km (0.84 mi) northeast of Sierra Island and 650 m (710 yd) southeast of Emeline Island. Extending 450 by 260 m (490 by 280 yd). The area was visited by early 19th century sealers.

Named after the settlement of Dolni (Lower) Pasarel in western Bulgaria.

== Location ==
Pasarel Island is located at 62°23′50″S 59°46′30″W. Bulgarian mapping in 2009.

== See also ==
- Composite Gazetteer of Antarctica
- List of Antarctic islands south of 60° S
- SCAR
- Territorial claims in Antarctica

== Map ==
- L.L. Ivanov. Antarctica: Livingston Island and Greenwich, Robert, Snow and Smith Islands. Scale 1:120000 topographic map. Troyan: Manfred Wörner Foundation, 2010. ISBN 978-954-92032-9-5 (First edition 2009. ISBN 978-954-92032-6-4)
- Antarctic Digital Database (ADD). Scale 1:250000 topographic map of Antarctica. Scientific Committee on Antarctic Research (SCAR). Since 1993, regularly upgraded and updated.
- L.L. Ivanov. Antarctica: Livingston Island and Smith Island. Scale 1:100000 topographic map. Manfred Wörner Foundation, 2017. ISBN 978-619-90008-3-0
