= Cecilia Island =

Island in the South Shetland Islands, Antarctica

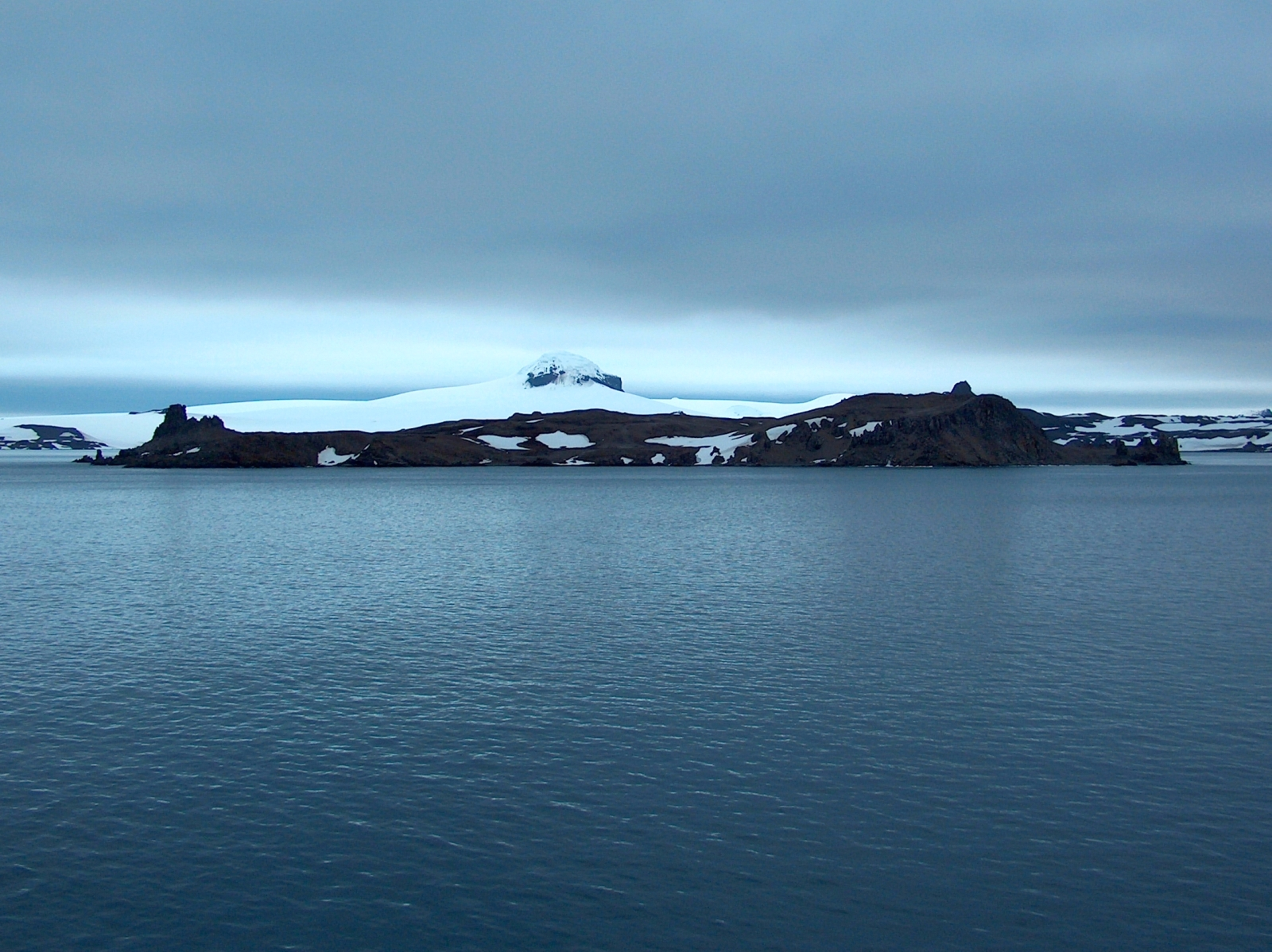
- Cecilia Island from English Strait, with Mount Plymouth, Greenwich Island in the background

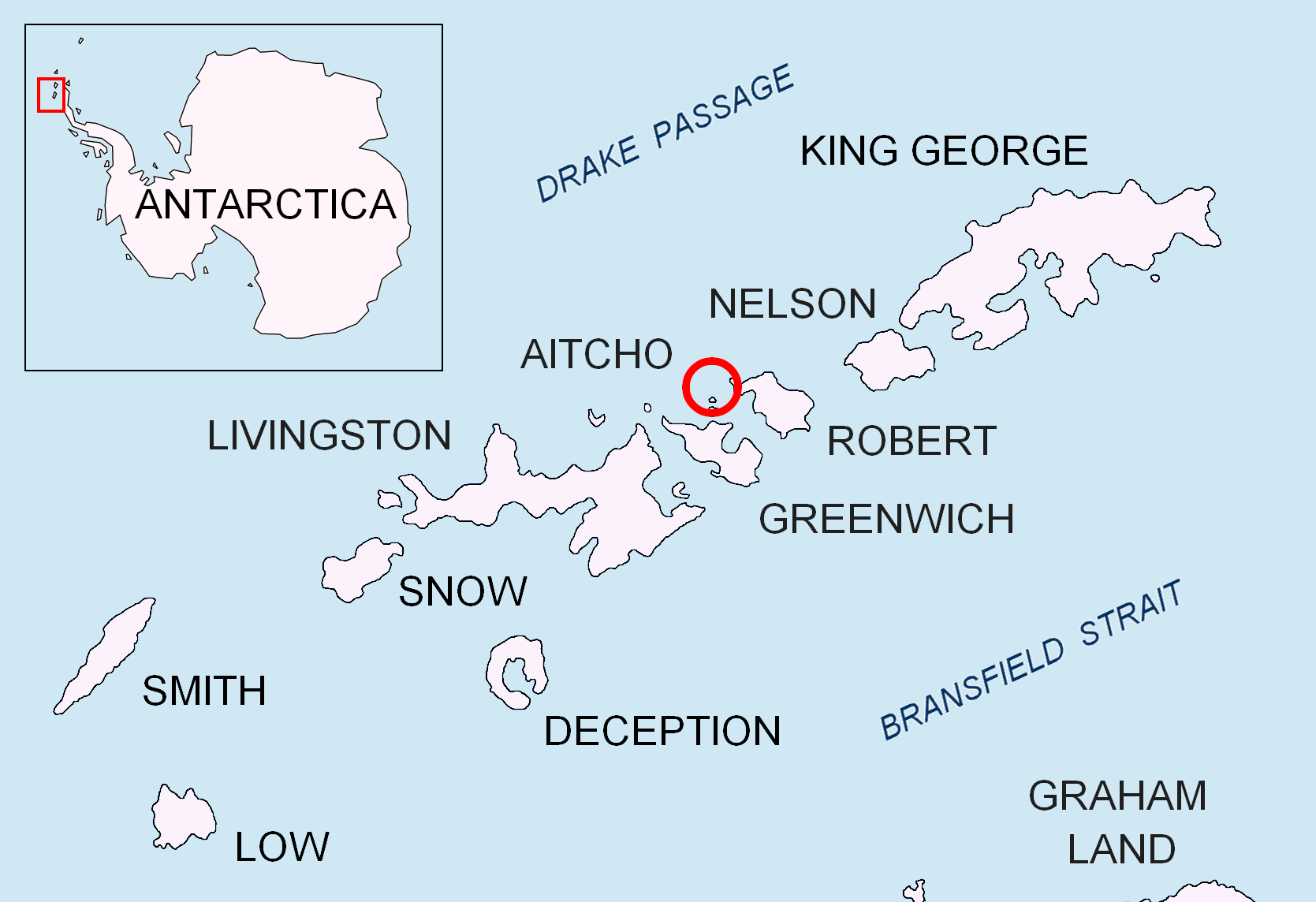
- Location of Cecilia Island

- Location within Antarctic Peninsula Location within Antarctica

Geography
- Location: Antarctica
- Coordinates: 62°24′46.2″S 59°43′42.6″W
- Archipelago: Aitcho group
- Area: 36 ha (89 acres)
- Length: 910 m (2990 ft)
- Width: 450 m (1480 ft)

Administration
- Antarctica
- Administered under the Antarctic Treaty System

Demographics
- Population: uninhabited

Cecilia Island is the ice-free southernmost island of the Aitcho group on the west side of English Strait in the South Shetland Islands, Antarctica. Extending 910 by 450 m (1,000 by 490 yd), surface area 36 hectares (89 acres). The area, visited by American and English sealers in the early 19th century, nowadays has become a popular tourist site frequented by Antarctic cruise ships.

The feature's name derives from 'Cecilias Straits' applied to English Strait by Captain John Davis after the shallop Cecilia, tender to his ship Huron that visited the South Shetlands in 1820–22. It was from the Cecilia that the first landing on the Antarctic mainland was made at Hughes Bay on 7 February 1821.

== Location ==
The midpoint is located at 62°24′46.2″S 59°43′42.6″W and the island is lying 3.07 km (1.91 mi) north of Spark Point, Greenwich Island, 2.07 km (1.29 mi) east-northeast of Dee Island, 280 m (310 yd) southeast of Barrientos Island, 3.39 km (2.11 mi) southwest of Debelyanov Point, Robert Island and 4.83 km (3.00 mi) west of Negra Point, Robert Island (Chilean mapping in 1961, British in 1968, Argentine in 1980, and Bulgarian in 2005 and 2009).

Topographic map of Livingston Island, Greenwich, Robert, Snow and Smith Islands.

== See also ==
- Aitcho Islands
- Composite Antarctic Gazetteer
- List of Antarctic islands south of 60° S
- SCAR
- South Shetland Islands
- Territorial claims in Antarctica

== Map ==
- L.L. Ivanov et al. Antarctica: Livingston Island and Greenwich Island, South Shetland Islands. Scale 1:100000 topographic map. Sofia: Antarctic Place-names Commission of Bulgaria, 2005.
