= Holmes Rock =

Islet off Antarctica

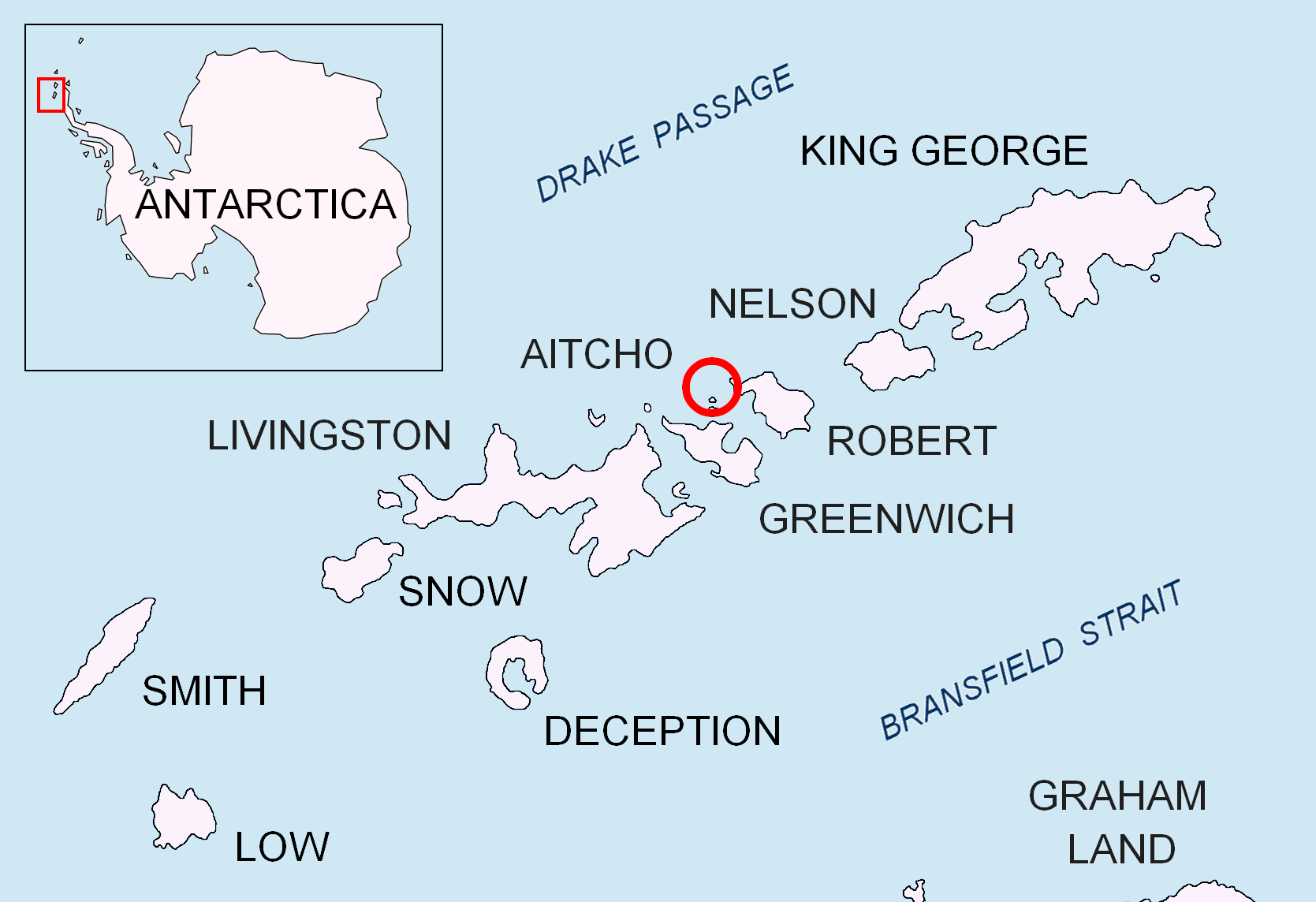
- Location of Aitcho Islands in the South Shetland Islands.

- Location within Antarctic Peninsula Location within Antarctica

Geography
- Location: Antarctica
- Coordinates: 62°22′58.8″S 59°50′06″W
- Archipelago: South Shetland Islands

Administration
- Administered under the Antarctic Treaty System

Demographics
- Population: Uninhabited

Holmes Rock is rising to 45 m (49 yd) north of Greenwich Island and west of Aitcho group in the South Shetland Islands, Antarctica. The area was visited by early 19th century sealers.

The feature is named after Captain Jeremiah Holmes, Master of the American sealing vessel Emeline that visited the South Shetlands in 1820-21 and operated from nearby Clothier Harbour.

== Location ==
The rock is located 2.3 km (1.43 mi) west of Riksa Islands, 2.1 km (1.30 mi) west-northwest of Emeline Island, 1.53 km (0.95 mi) north-northeast of Stoker Island, 4.4 km (2.73 mi) east-southeast of Romeo Island, 4.15 km (2.58 mi) south by west of Table Island and 2.55 km (1.58 mi) southwest of Morris Rock. It is separated from neighbouring Nikudin Rock to the west-southwest by a 150 m wide passage (British mapping in 1968, Chilean in 1971, Argentine in 1980, and Bulgarian in 2005 and 2009).

== See also ==
- Aitcho Islands
- Composite Antarctic Gazetteer
- Greenwich Island
- List of Antarctic islands south of 60° S
- SCAR
- Territorial claims in Antarctica

== Maps ==
- L.L. Ivanov et al. Antarctica: Livingston Island and Greenwich Island, South Shetland Islands. Scale 1:100000 topographic map. Sofia: Antarctic Place-names Commission of Bulgaria, 2005.
- L.L. Ivanov. Antarctica: Livingston Island and Greenwich, Robert, Snow and Smith Islands. Scale 1:120000 topographic map. Troyan: Manfred Wörner Foundation, 2009. ISBN 978-954-92032-6-4
