= Stoker Island =

Island in the South Shetland Islands, Antarctica

- Location of Greenwich Island in the South Shetland Islands

- Location within Antarctic Peninsula Location within Antarctica

Geography
- Location: Antarctica
- Coordinates: 62°23′50.4″S 59°50′54.1″W
- Archipelago: South Shetland Islands
- Area: 20 ha (49 acres)
- Length: 0.55 km (0.342 mi)
- Width: 0.4 km (0.25 mi)

Administration
- Antarctica
- Administered under the Antarctic Treaty System

Demographics
- Population: uninhabited

Topographic map of Livingston Island, Greenwich, Robert, Snow and Smith Islands.

Stoker Island is a rocky island lying off the north coast of Greenwich Island in the South Shetland Islands, Antarctica. Extending 550 by 400 m (600 by 440 yd), surface area 20 hectares (49 acres). The area was visited by early 19th century sealers.

The feature is named after Donald Tait, 'stoker' of the survey motor boat Nimrod of the Royal Navy Hydrographic Survey Unit in the South Shetlands in 1967.

== Location ==
The midpoint is located at 62°23′50.4″S 59°50′54.1″W which is 2.65 km (1.65 mi) west-southwest of Emeline Island, 2.2 km (1.4 mi) northwest of Sierra Island, 3.7 km (2.3 mi) northwest of Dee Island, 3.9 km (2.4 mi) northeast of Ongley Island, 4.26 km (2.65 mi) southeast of Romeo Island and 1.7 km (1.1 mi) south-southwest of Holmes Rock (British mapping in 1968, Chilean in 1971, Argentine in 1980, and Bulgarian in 2005 and 2009).

== See also ==
- Composite Antarctic Gazetteer
- Greenwich Island
- List of Antarctic islands south of 60° S
- SCAR
- South Shetland Islands
- Territorial claims in Antarctica

== Map ==
- L.L. Ivanov et al. Antarctica: Livingston Island and Greenwich Island, South Shetland Islands. Scale 1:100000 topographic map. Sofia: Antarctic Place-names Commission of Bulgaria, 2005.
