= Kilifarevo Island =

Island in the South Shetland Islands, Antarctica

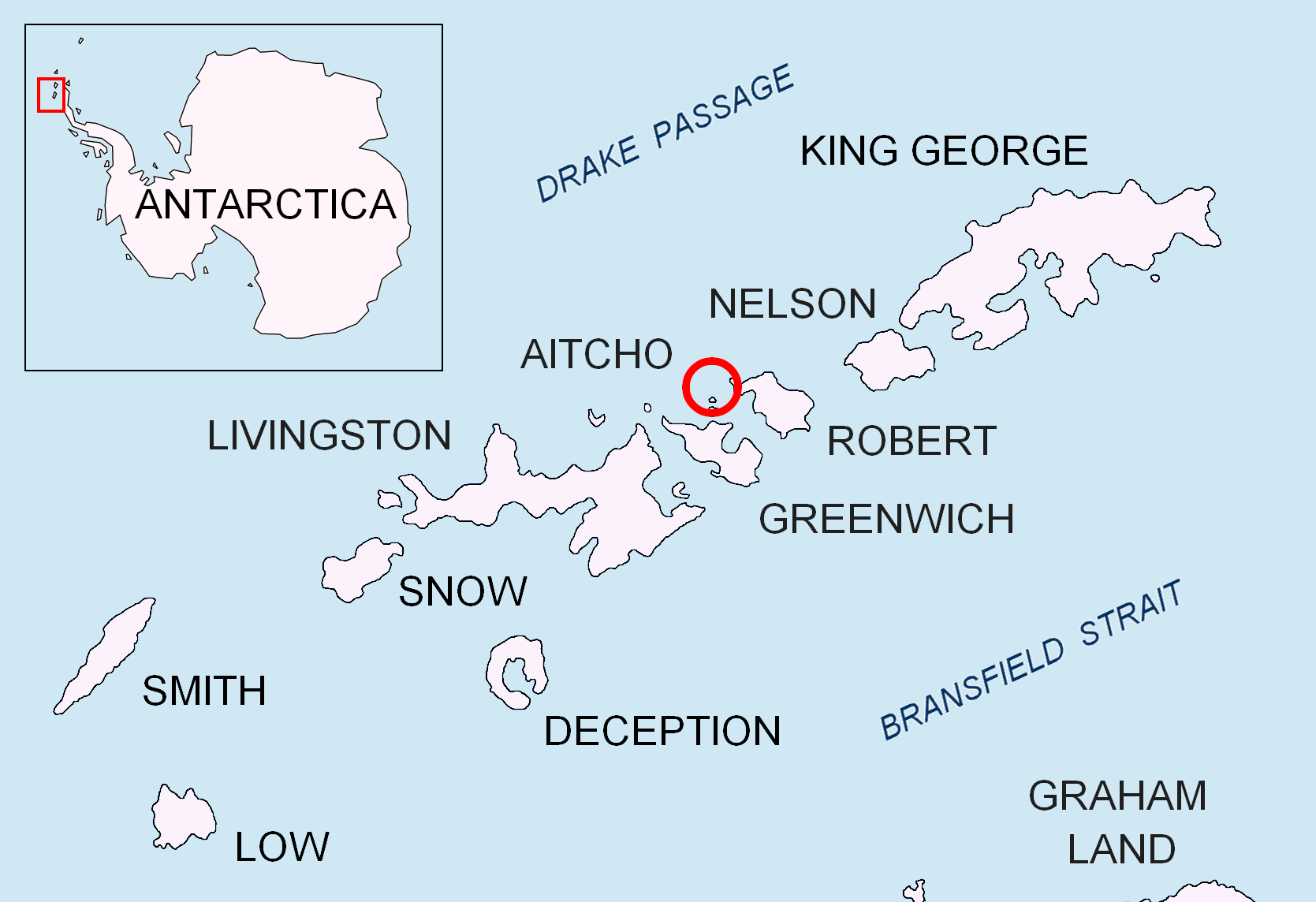
- Location of Kilifarevo Island in the South Shetland Islands

- Location within Antarctica Location within Antarctic Peninsula

Geography
- Location: Antarctica
- Coordinates: 62°22′26″S 59°47′14″W
- Archipelago: Aitcho group
- Area: 11 ha (27 acres)
- Length: 0.64 km (0.398 mi)
- Width: 0.35 km (0.217 mi)

Administration
- Administered under the Antarctic Treaty System

Demographics
- Population: Uninhabited

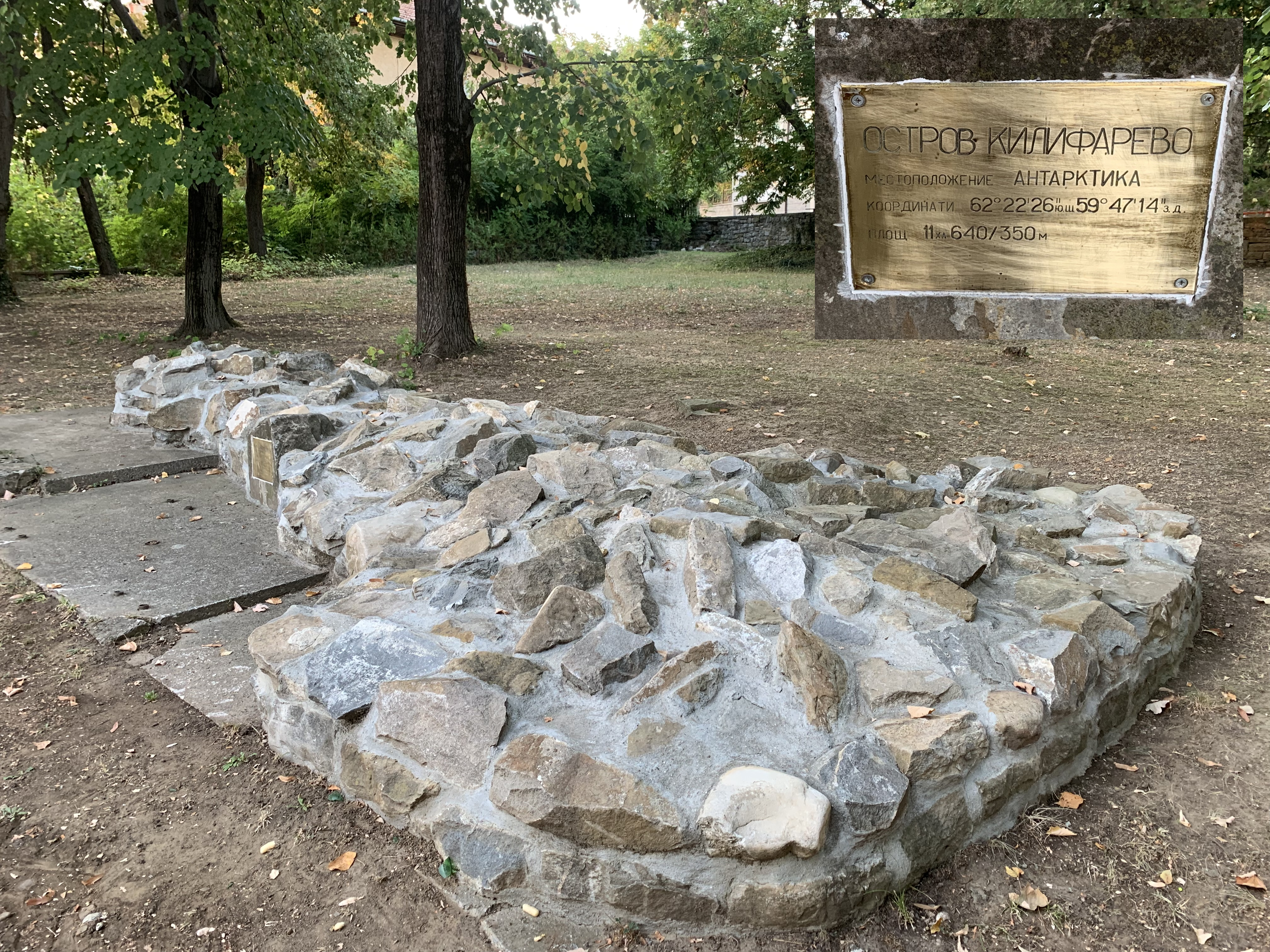
The stone model of Kilifarevo Island in Antarctica Park, Kilifarevo

Kilifarevo Island (Bulgarian: остров Килифарево, romanized: Ostrov Kilifarevo, IPA: [ˈɔstrof kiliˈfarɛvo]) is an ice-free island in the Aitcho group on the west side of English Strait in the South Shetland Islands, Antarctica. The island is situated 850 m (930 yd) northwest of Jorge Island, 460 m (500 yd) north of Riksa Islands and 350 m (380 yd) southeast of Morris Rock. Extending 640 by 350 m (700 by 380 yd), surface area 11 hectares (27 acres). The area was visited by early 19th century sealers.

Kilifarevo Island is named after the town of Kilifarevo in northern Bulgaria.

== Location ==
The island is located at 62°22′26″S 59°47′14″W. Bulgarian mapping in 2009.

== See also ==
- Composite Gazetteer of Antarctica
- List of Antarctic islands south of 60° S
- SCAR
- Territorial claims in Antarctica
