= Dragash Point =

Location of Greenwich Island in the South Shetland Islands.

Topographic map of Livingston Island, Greenwich, Robert, Snow and Smith Islands.

Dragash Point (Bulgarian: нос Драгаш, ‘Nos Dragash’ \'nos 'dra-gash\) is the rocky point forming the south extremity of Dee Island in the South Shetland Islands, Antarctica.

The point is named after the settlement of Dragash Voyvoda in Nikopol Municipality, northern Bulgaria.

== Location ==
Dragash Point is located at 62°26′01″S 59°47′44″W, which is 890 m north-northwest of Agüedo Point and 1.06 km northeast of Brusen Point, Greenwich Island. British mapping in 1968, Chilean in 1971, Argentine in 1980, and Bulgarian in 2005 and 2009.

== Maps ==
- L.L. Ivanov et al. Antarctica: Livingston Island and Greenwich Island, South Shetland Islands. Scale 1:100000 topographic map. Sofia: Antarctic Place-names Commission of Bulgaria, 2005.
- L.L. Ivanov. Antarctica: Livingston Island and Greenwich, Robert, Snow and Smith Islands. Scale 1:120000 topographic map. Troyan: Manfred Wörner Foundation, 2009. ISBN 978-954-92032-6-4 (Updated second edition 2010. ISBN 978-954-92032-9-5)
