= Table Island (South Shetland Islands) =

Rocky island lying in Antarctica

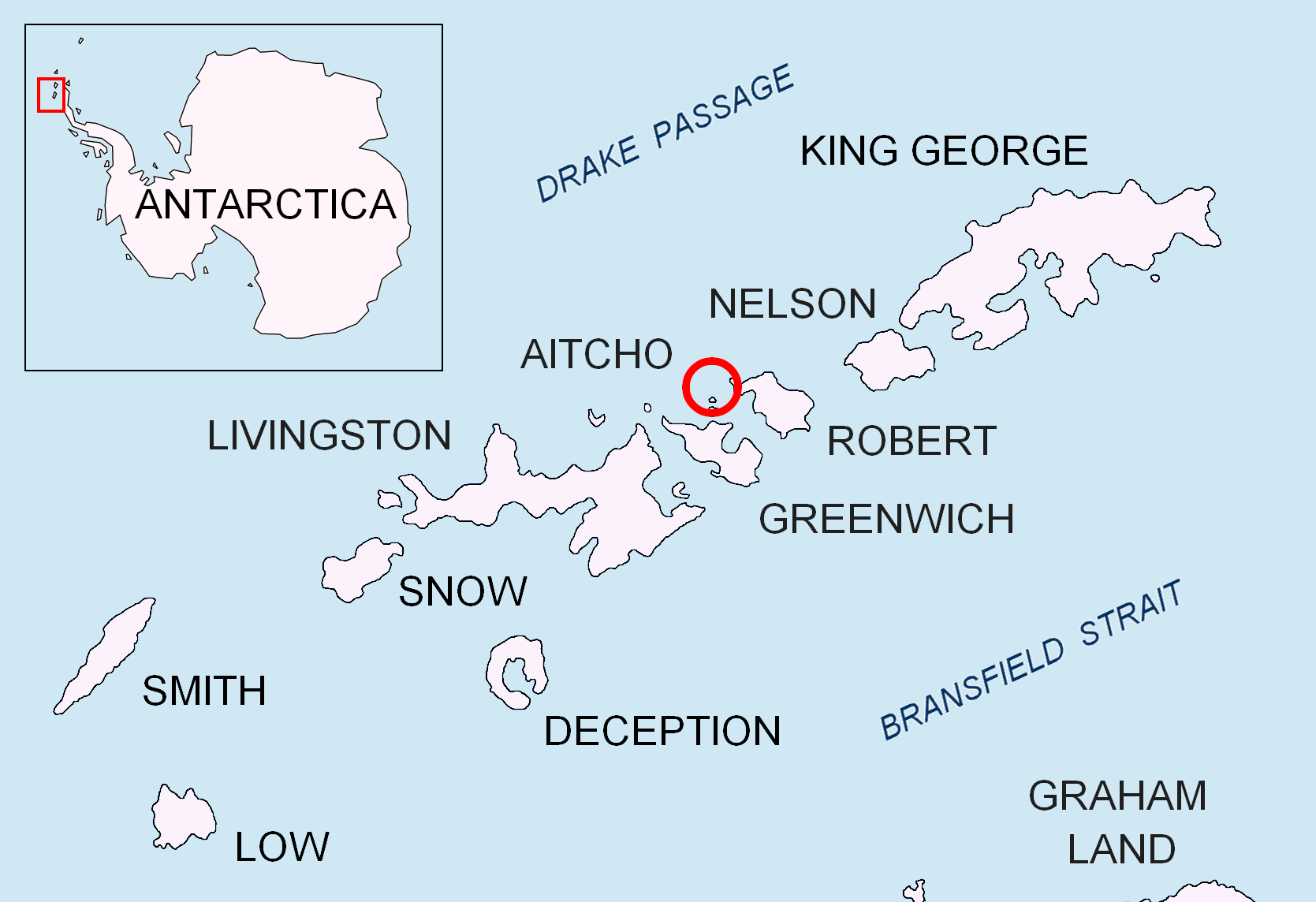
- Location of Aitcho Islands in the South Shetland Islands

- Location within Antarctica Location within Antarctic Peninsula

Geography
- Location: Antarctica
- Coordinates: 62°20′34.8″S 59°48′29.7″W
- Archipelago: South Shetland Islands
- Area: 1.12 km^{2} (0.43 sq mi)
- Length: 1.4 km (0.87 mi)
- Width: 1.0 km (0.62 mi)
- Highest elevation: 150 m (490 ft)

Administration
- Antarctica
- Administered under the Antarctic Treaty System

Demographics
- Population: uninhabited

Topographic map of Livingston Island, Greenwich, Robert, Snow and Smith Islands.

Table Island is a conspicuous flat-topped, rocky island lying north of Greenwich Island and north-northwest of the Aitcho group on the west side of English Strait in the South Shetland Islands, Antarctica. The island is rising to over 150 metres (492 feet) and extending 1.4 by 1 kilometre (0.87 by 0.62 miles), with a surface area of 112 hectares (280 acres). It is separated from Aitcho Islands to the south-southeast by the 1.9-kilometre (1.2-mile) wide Klimash Passage.

Turmoil Rock (62°21′17.9″S 59°47′02.5″W) is lying 1.32 kilometres (0.82 miles) southeast of Table Island and 1.65 km (1.03 mi) north-northeast of Morris Rock. The area was visited by early-19th-century sealers.

The island was descriptively named by sealers from its shape, while the rock was descriptively named from the breakers it creates, following a survey from HMS Protector in 1967.

== Location ==
The midpoint of Table Island is located at 62°20′34.8″S 59°48′29.7″W and the island lies 4.85 km (3.01 mi) northwest of Fort William, Robert Island, 7.9 km (4.9 mi) north of Dee Island, 2.5 km (1.6 mi) north of Morris Rock, 4.14 km (2.57 mi) north by east of Holmes Rock, 6.1 km (3.8 mi) northeast of Romeo Island, 2.76 km (1.71 mi) southwest of Potmess Rocks and 4.68 km (2.91 mi) west by south of Rogozen Island (British mapping in 1820, 1821, 1822, 1935 and 1968, Spain in 1861, Chilean in 1947, Argentine in 1980, and Bulgarian in 2005 and 2009).

== See also ==
- Aitcho Islands
- Composite Antarctic Gazetteer
- List of Antarctic islands south of 60° S
- SCAR
- South Shetland Islands
- Territorial claims in Antarctica
