= Morris Rock =

Island in the South Shetland Islands

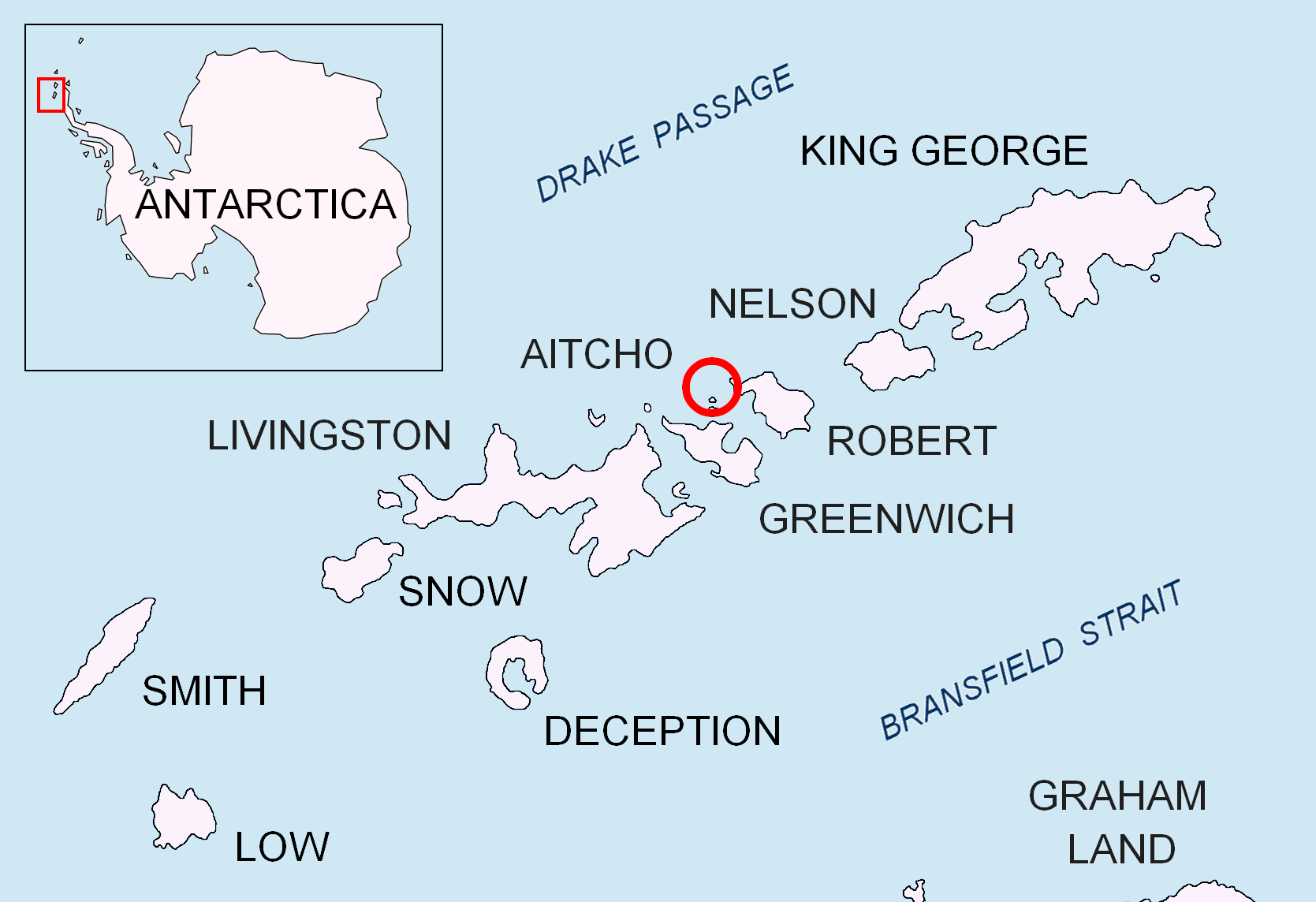
- Location of Aitcho Islands in the South Shetland Islands.

- Location within Antarctic Peninsula Location within Antarctica

Geography
- Location: Antarctica
- Coordinates: 62°22′07.3″S 59°47′47.6″W
- Archipelago: South Shetland Islands

Administration
- Administered under the Antarctic Treaty System

Demographics
- Population: Uninhabited

Morris Rock is a rock outcropping that rises to 55 m (180 ft) in the northwest extremity of the Aitcho group, English Strait in the South Shetland Islands, Antarctica. The area was visited by early 19th century sealers.

The feature is named after Alfred Morris (b. 1890), draughtsman in the Admiralty Hydrographic Office in 1935.

== Location ==
The rock is located at 62°22′07.3″S 59°47′47.6″W which is 350 m (383 yd) northwest of Kilifarevo Island, 2.33 km (1.45 mi) north of Emeline Island, 2.55 km (1.58 mi) northeast of Holmes Rock, 2.53 km (1.57 mi) south by east of Table Island, and 3.71 km (2.31 mi) west by north of Fort William, Robert Island (British mapping in 1968, Chilean in 1971, Argentine in 1980, and Bulgarian in 2005 and 2009).

== See also ==
- Aitcho Islands
- Composite Antarctic Gazetteer
- List of Antarctic islands south of 60° S
- SCAR
- South Shetland Islands
- Territorial claims in Antarctica

== Maps ==
- L.L. Ivanov et al. Antarctica: Livingston Island and Greenwich Island, South Shetland Islands. Scale 1:100000 topographic map. Sofia: Antarctic Place-names Commission of Bulgaria, 2005.
- L.L. Ivanov. Antarctica: Livingston Island and Greenwich, Robert, Snow and Smith Islands. Scale 1:120000 topographic map. Troyan: Manfred Wörner Foundation, 2009. ISBN 978-954-92032-6-4
