= Riksa Islands =

Island group in South Shetland Islands, Antarctica

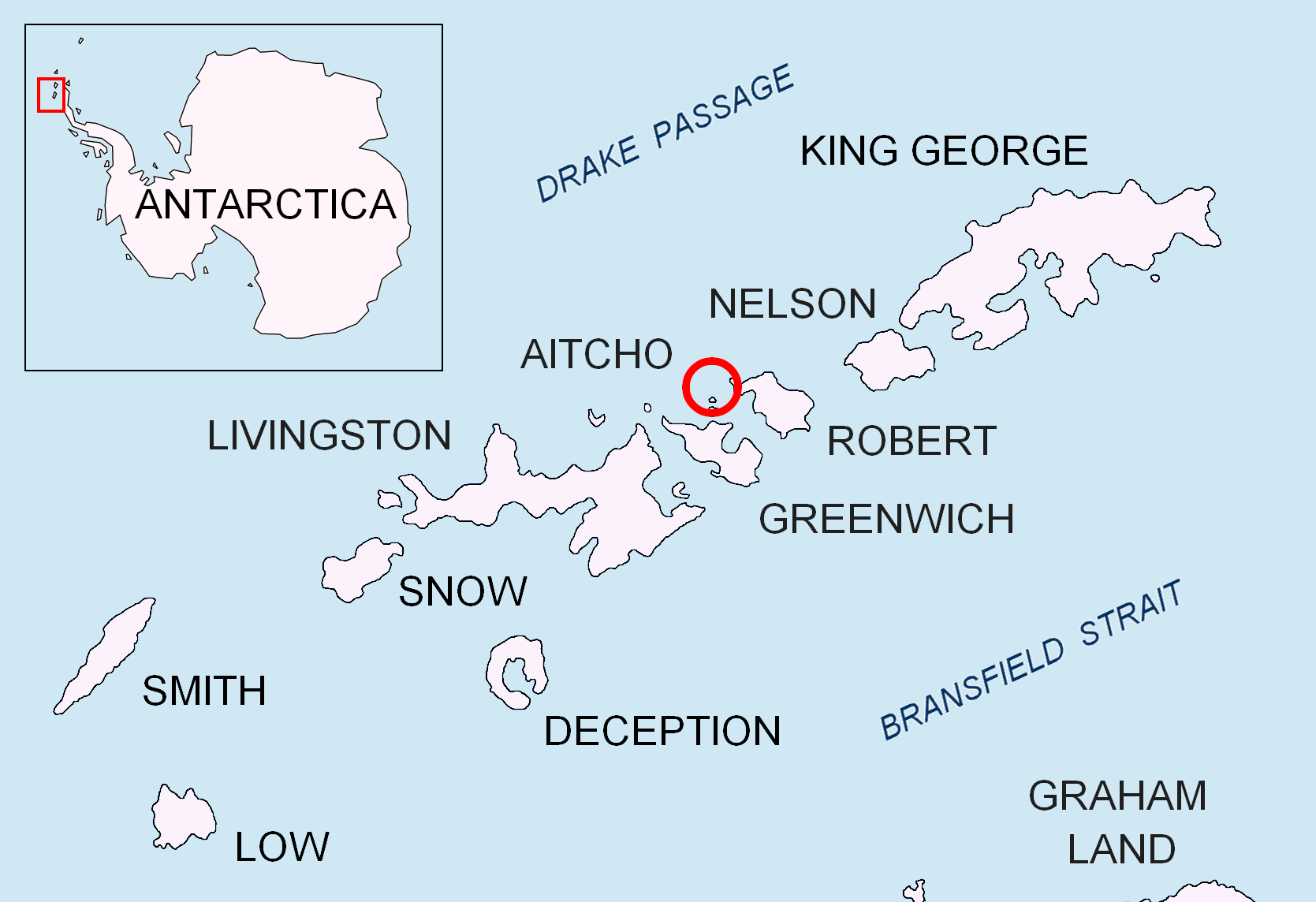
- Location of Riksa Island in the South Shetland Islands

- Location within Antarctica Location within Antarctic Peninsula

Geography
- Location: Antarctica
- Coordinates: 62°23′05″S 59°46′49″W
- Archipelago: Aitcho group

Administration
- Antarctica
- Administered under the Antarctic Treaty System

Demographics
- Population: uninhabited

Topographic map of Livingston Island, Greenwich, Robert, Snow and Smith Islands

Riksa Islands (Bulgarian: острови Рикса, ‘Ostrovi Riksa’ \'os-trovi 'ri-ksa\) are three adjacent ice-free islands in the Aitcho group on the west side of English Strait in the South Shetland Islands, Antarctica. The islands are situated 250 m (270 yd) west of Bilyana Island, 650 m (710 yd) northeast of Emeline Island and 2.1 km (1.3 mi) east of Holmes Rock. The area was visited by early 19th century sealers.

The group comprises the islands of Cricklewood (62°23′05″S 59°46′27″W), Taunton (62°23′03″S 59°46′56″W) and Bath (62°22′53″S 59°47′19″W).

Riksa Islands are named after the settlements of Kamenna (Stone) Riksa and Lower Riksa in northwestern Bulgaria. Cricklewood Island is named after the district of London where the main part of the UKHO was located until 1968. Taunton Island is named after the town of Taunton in England, where the UKHO printing works has been located since 1941 and where the remainder of the Office moved in 1968. Bath Island is named after the city of Bath in England, where sections of the UKHO were temporarily located during World War II.

== Location ==
The islands are located at 62°23′05″S 59°46′49″W. Bulgarian mapping in 2009.

== See also ==
- Composite Gazetteer of Antarctica
- List of Antarctic islands south of 60° S
- SCAR
- Territorial claims in Antarctica

== Map ==
- L.L. Ivanov. Antarctica: Livingston Island and Greenwich, Robert, Snow and Smith Islands. Scale 1:120000 topographic map. Troyan: Manfred Wörner Foundation, 2010. ISBN 978-954-92032-9-5 (First edition 2009. ISBN 978-954-92032-6-4)
- Antarctic Digital Database (ADD). Scale 1:250000 topographic map of Antarctica. Scientific Committee on Antarctic Research (SCAR). Since 1993, regularly upgraded and updated.
- L.L. Ivanov. Antarctica: Livingston Island and Smith Island. Scale 1:100000 topographic map. Manfred Wörner Foundation, 2017. ISBN 978-619-90008-3-0
