= Carlota Cove =

Location of Robert Island in the South Shetland Islands.

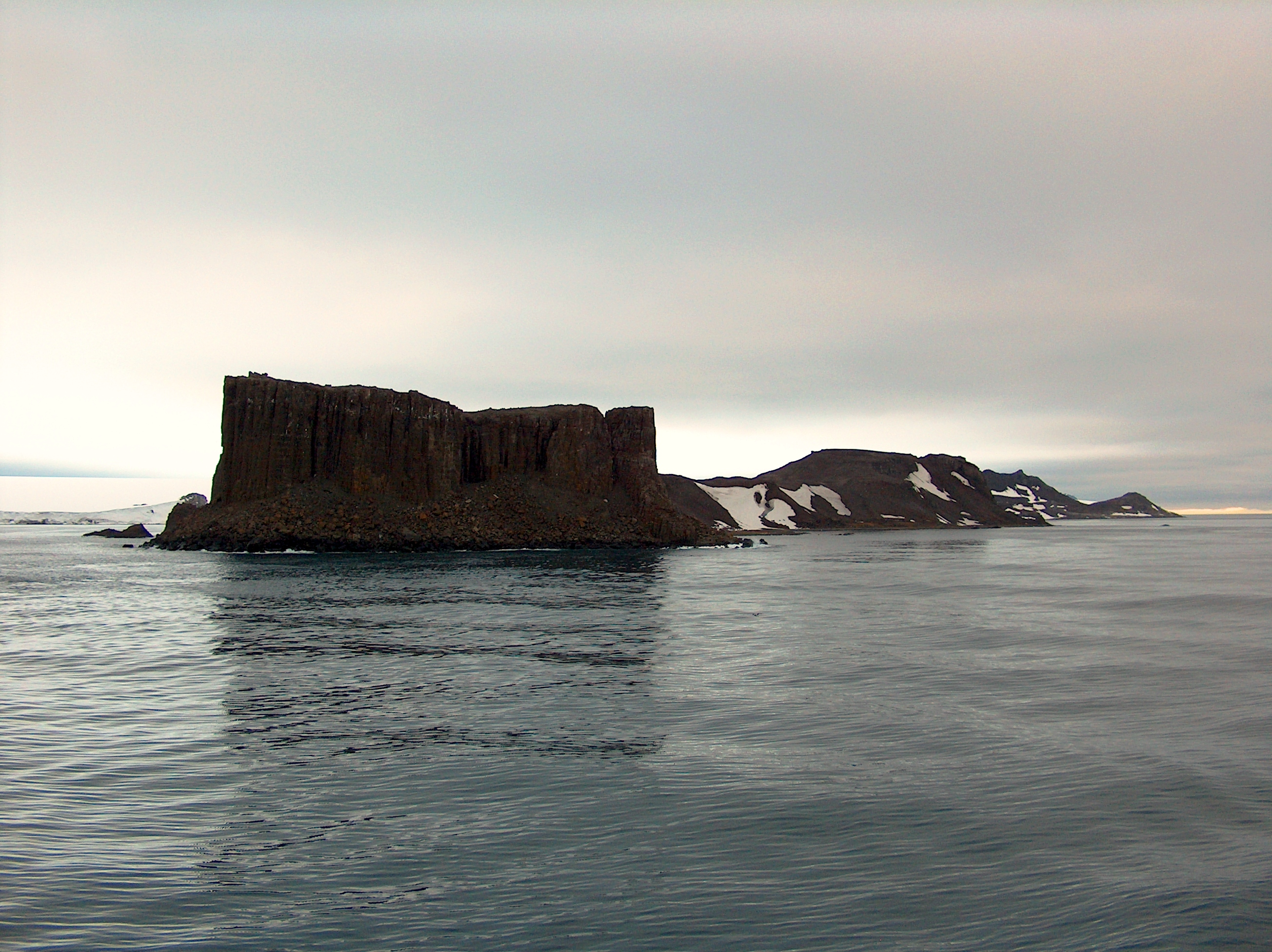
Carlota Cove (on the left) from English Strait, with Fort William in the foreground.

Topographic map of Livingston Island, Greenwich, Robert, Snow and Smith Islands.

Carlota Cove is the 1.9 km wide cove indenting for 1.14 km the northwest coast of Alfatar Peninsula, Robert Island in the South Shetland Islands, Antarctica next east of Coppermine Peninsula, and entered between Fort William and Misnomer Point. The area was visited by early 19th century sealers operating from neighbouring Clothier Harbour.

The feature was surveyed and named by the 1949 Chilean Antarctic Expedition under Captain Leopoldo Fontaine.

== Location ==
The cove's midpoint is located at 62°22′15.7″S 59°41′47.9″W (British mapping in 1935, 1967 and 1968, Argentine in 1957 and 1980, Chilean in 1961 and 1971, and Bulgarian in 2009).

== See also ==
- Alfatar Peninsula
- Robert Island

== Map ==
- L.L. Ivanov. Antarctica: Livingston Island and Greenwich, Robert, Snow and Smith Islands. Scale 1:120000 topographic map. Troyan: Manfred Wörner Foundation, 2009. ISBN 978-954-92032-6-4
