= Okol Rocks =

Group of small islands in the South Shetland Islands, Antarctica

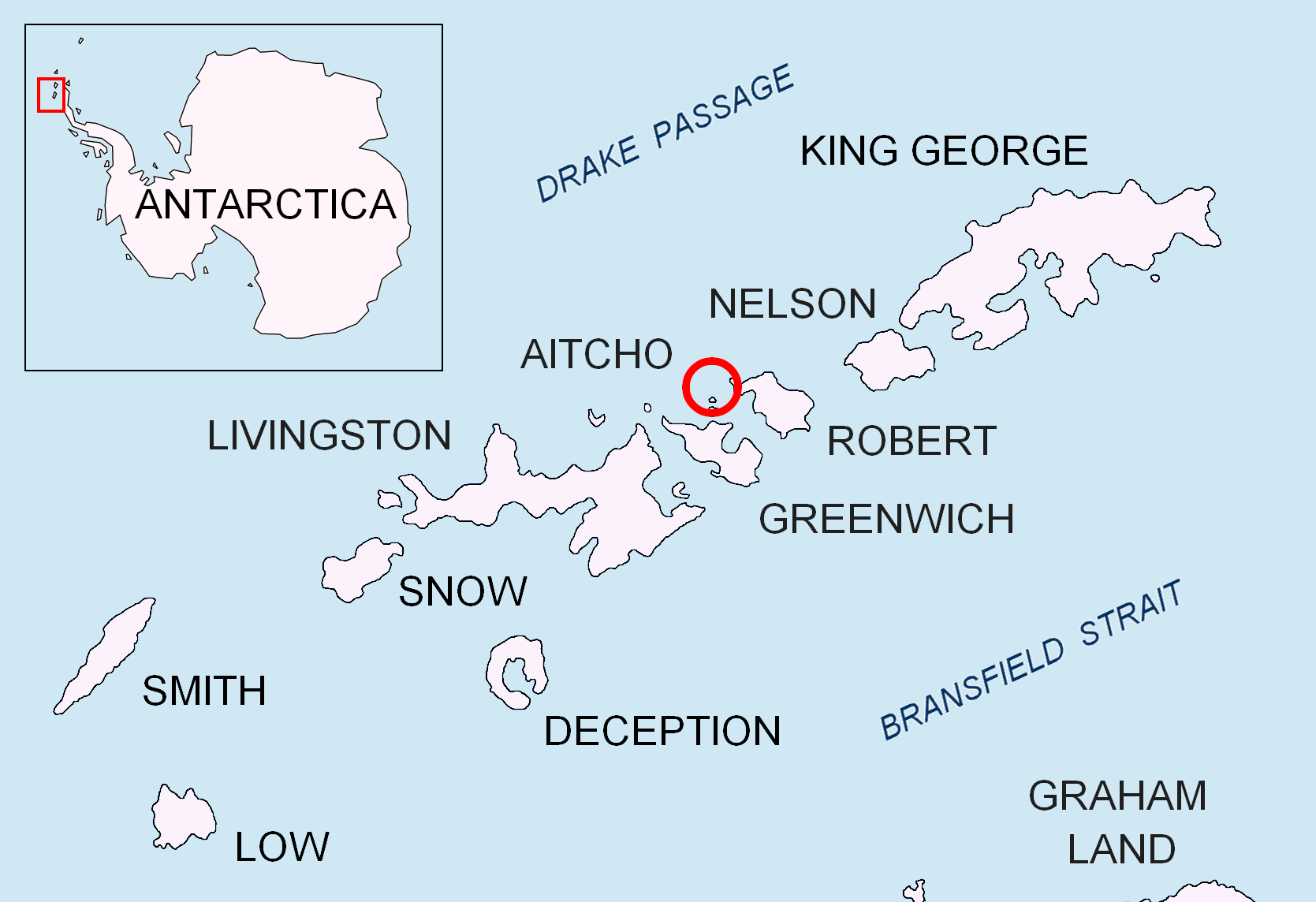
- Location of Aitcho Islands in the South Shetland Islands

- Location within Antarctica Location within Antarctic Peninsula

Geography
- Location: Antarctica
- Coordinates: 62°22′19″S 59°45′42″W
- Archipelago: South Shetland Islands

Administration
- Administered under the Antarctic Treaty System

Demographics
- Population: Uninhabited

Topographic map of Livingston Island, Greenwich, Robert, Snow and Smith Islands.

Okol Rocks (Bulgarian: скали Окол, ‘Skali Okol’ ska-'li o-'kol) is a group of rocks in the north of Aitcho Islands group on the west side of English Strait in the South Shetland Islands, Antarctica. The principal feature in the group is Lambert Island (62°22′16″S 59°45′49″W).

Passage Rock (62°22′19″S 59°45′42″W) is lying 800 m (870 yd) east of Okol Rocks and 1.07 km (0.66 mi) west by south of Fort William, Robert Island, with Cheshire Rock (62°22′29.7″S 59°44′40.9″W) lying 370 m (405 yd) south by east of Passage Rock, 1.09 km (0.68 mi) southwest of Fort William, 850 m (930 yd) northeast of Jorge Island and 900 m (980 yd) east-southeast of Okol Rocks. The area was visited by early 19th century sealers operating from nearby Clothier Harbour.

Okol Rocks are named after the settlements of Gorni (Upper) Okol and Dolni (Lower) Okol in western Bulgaria. Lambert Island is named after Rear Admiral Nick Lambert, national hydrographer (2010–2012) and commanding officer of HMS Endurance (2005–2007). Passage Rock was charted by Discovery Investigations personnel in 1935 and later descriptively named for being a leading mark for ships entering English Strait. Cheshire Rock is named after Lieutenant Commander Peter Cheshire, leader of the Royal Navy Hydrographic Survey Unit in the area in 1967.

== Location ==
Okol Rocks are centred at 62°22′19″S 59°45′42″W, which is 870 m (950 yd) north of Jorge Island, 1.34 m (1.47 yd) east of Kilifarevo Island and 1.89 km (1.17 mi) west of Fort William Point, Robert Island (British mapping in 1935, 1948, 1961, 1968 and 1974, Argentine in 1953, French in 1954, Chilean in 1961, 1962 and 1971, and Bulgarian in 2009).

== See also ==
- Composite Antarctic Gazetteer
- List of Antarctic islands south of 60° S
- SCAR
- Territorial claims in Antarctica

== Maps ==
- L.L. Ivanov. Antarctica: Livingston Island and Greenwich, Robert, Snow and Smith Islands. Scale 1:120000 topographic map. Troyan: Manfred Wörner Foundation, 2009. ISBN 978-954-92032-6-4
