= Barrientos Island =

Island in the South Shetland Islands, Antarctica

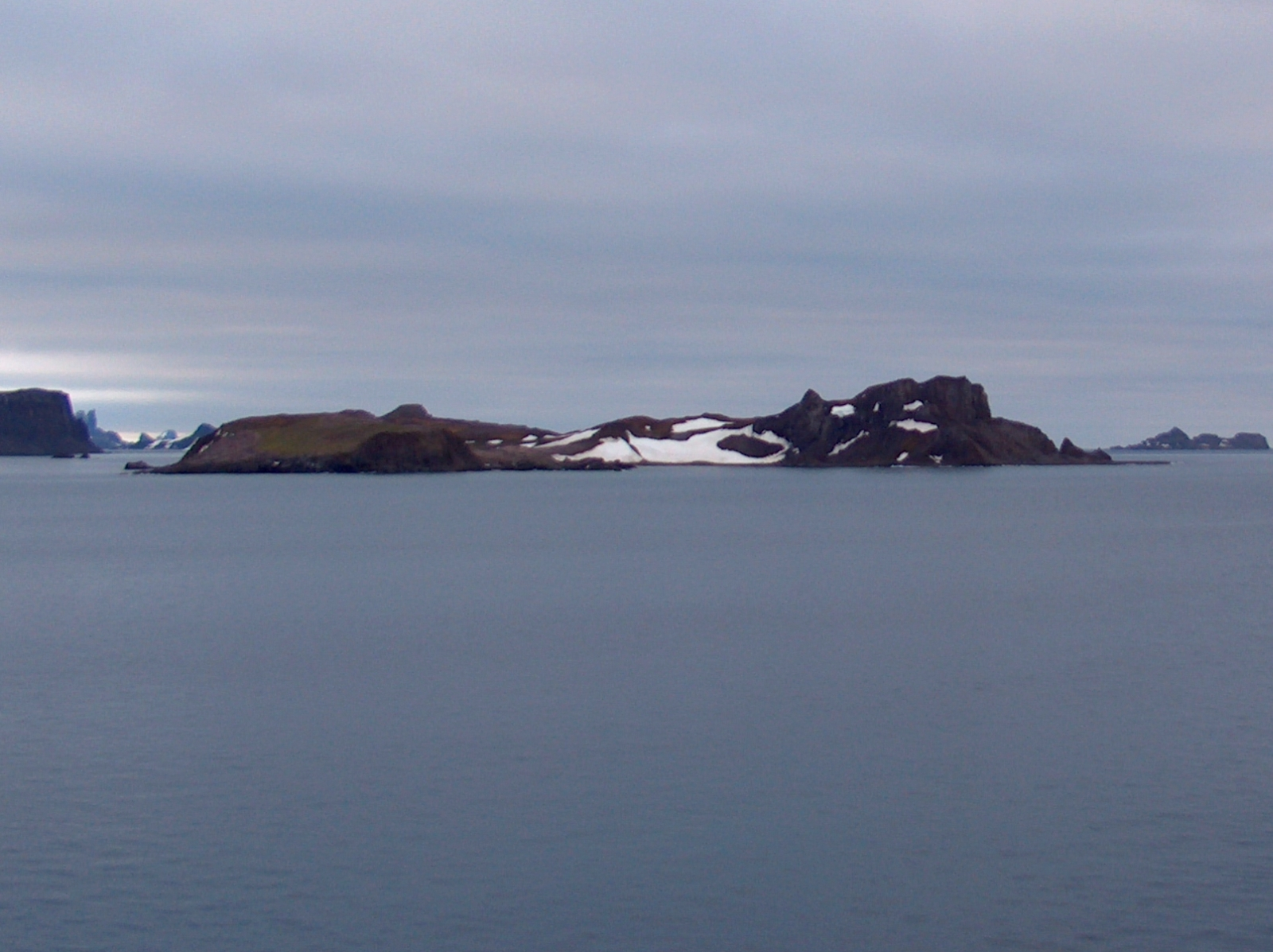
- Barrientos Island from English Strait

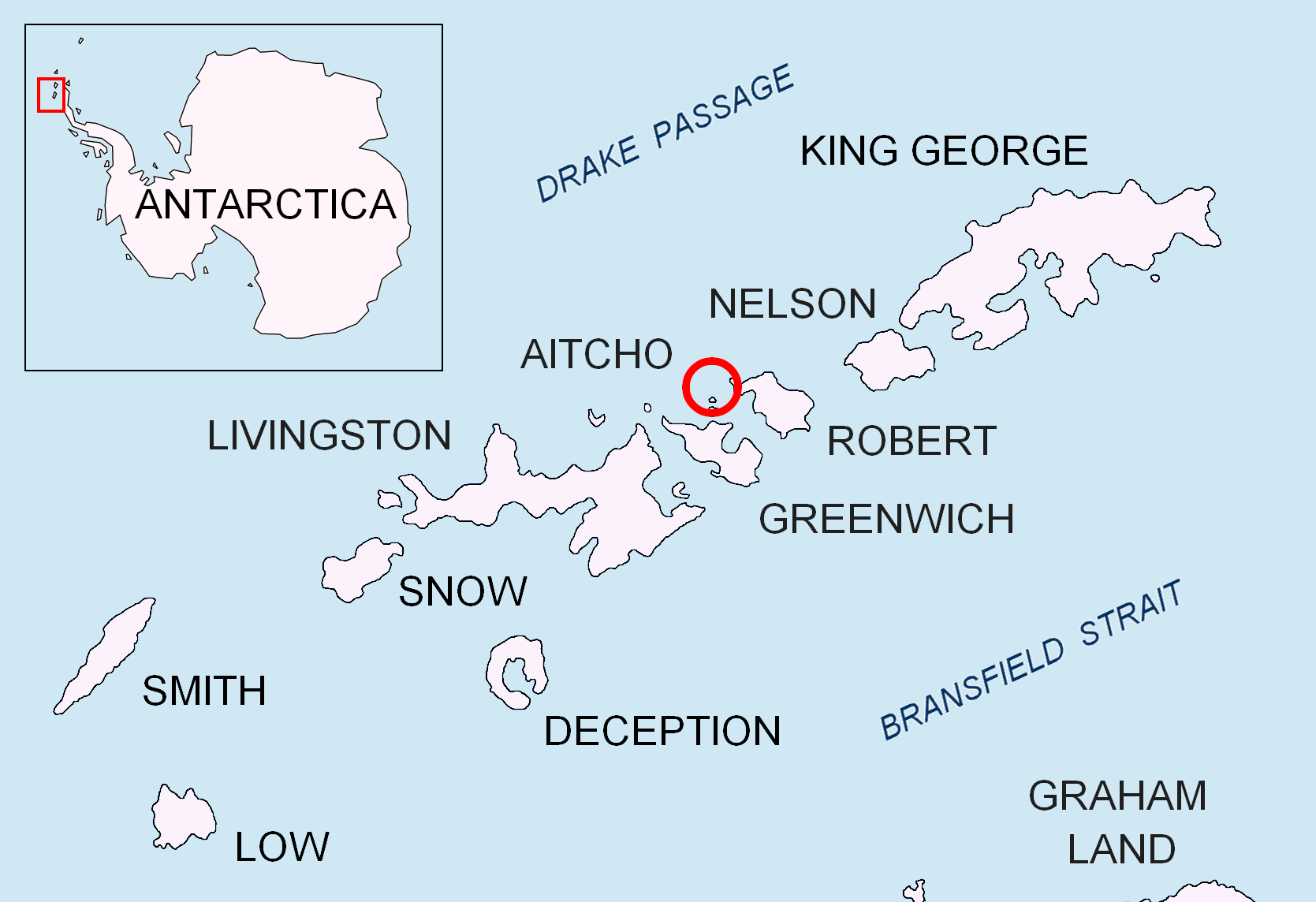
- Location of Aitcho Islands in the South Shetland Islands.

- Location of Barrientos Island Barrientos Island (Antarctica)

Geography
- Location: Antarctica
- Coordinates: 62°24′22″S 59°44′53″W
- Archipelago: Aitcho group
- Area: 0.9234 km^{2} (0.3565 sq mi)
- Length: 1.71 km (1.063 mi)
- Width: 0.54 km (0.336 mi)

Administration
- Administered under the Antarctic Treaty System

Demographics
- Population: Uninhabited

Barrientos Island is a small, ice-free island in the Aitcho group on the west side of English Strait in the South Shetland Islands, Antarctica. Extending 1.71 by 0.54 km (1.063 by 0.336 mi), surface area 65 hectares (160 acres). The area was visited by early 19th century sealers. Barrientos Island is a popular tourist site frequented by Antarctic cruise ships.

The feature was named by the Chilean Antarctic Expedition in 1949.

== Location ==
The midpoint is located at 62°24′22″S 59°44′53″W and the island is lying 280 m (310 yd) northwest of Cecilia Island, 4 km (2.5 mi) north-northwest of Spark Point, Greenwich Island, 1.1 km (0.68 mi) northeast of Dee Island, 1.52 km (0.94 mi) east of Sierra Island, 900 m (980 yd) southeast of Pasarel Island, 1.9 km (1.2 mi) south-southeast of Bilyana Island and 3.6 km (2.2 mi) south-southwest of Fort William, Robert Island (British mapping in 1968, Chilean in 1971, Argentine in 1980, and Bulgarian in 2005 and 2009).

== See also ==
- Aitcho Islands
- Composite Antarctic Gazetteer
- List of Antarctic islands south of 60° S
- SCAR
- South Shetland Islands
- Territorial claims in Antarctica
