= Coppermine Peninsula =

Location of Robert Island in the South Shetland Islands

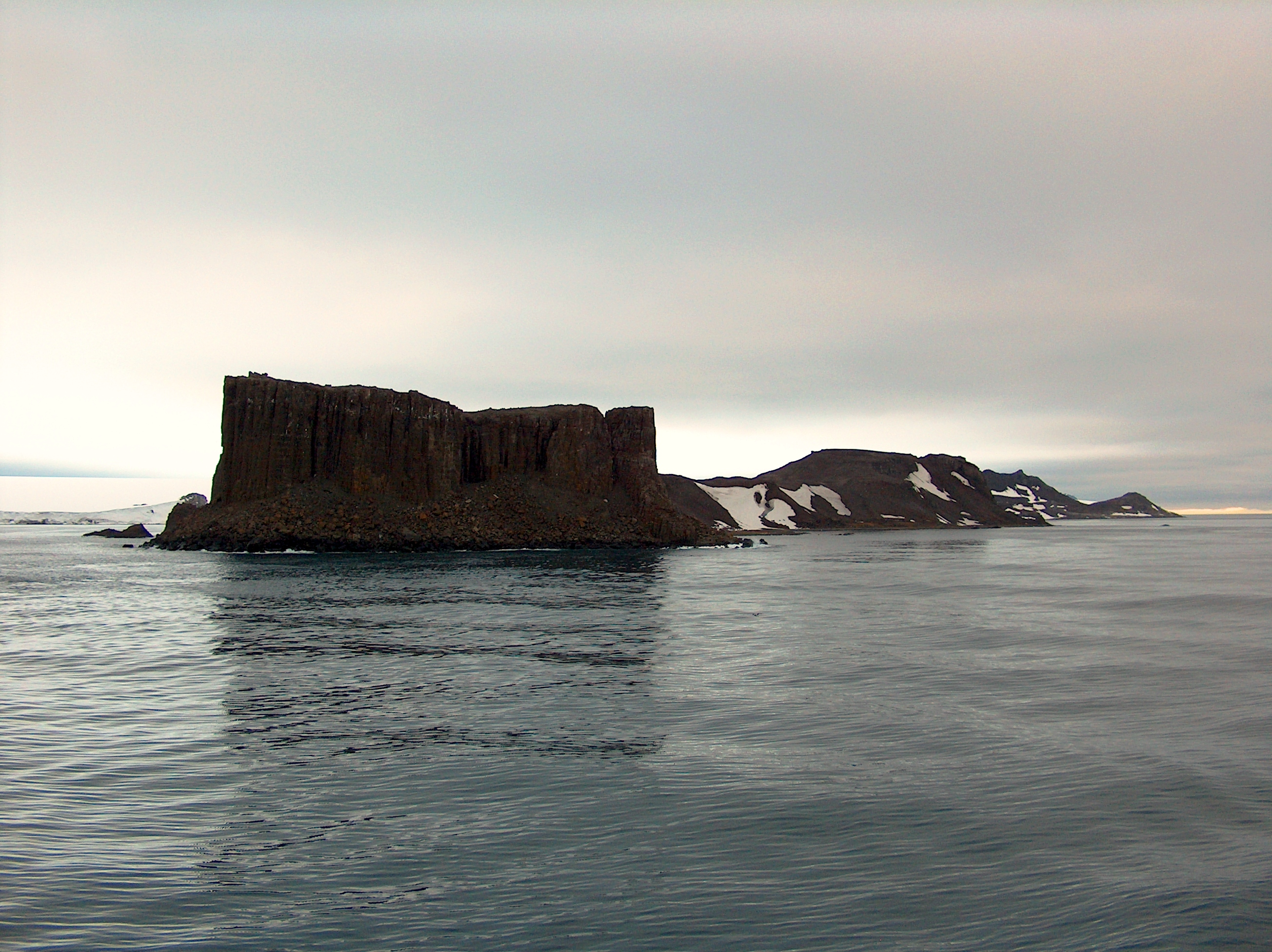
Coppermine Peninsula from English Strait, with Fort William in the foreground

Topographic map of Livingston Island, Greenwich, Robert, Snow and Smith Islands.

Coppermine Peninsula is the rugged, rocky promontory forming the northwest extremity of Alfatar Peninsula and Robert Island in the South Shetland Islands, Antarctica. It lies between the English Strait to the west and Carlota Cove to the east. It is 1.7 km long, 500 m wide and rising to 105 m.

Coppermine Peninsula is linked to Alfatar Peninsula to the southeast by a narrow isthmus bounded by Carlota Cove to the north and the 1 km wide and 460 m indenting Coppermine Cove (62°22′54″S 59°41′53″W) to the south. The feature is named in association with the adjacent Coppermine Cove, a descriptive name given by sealers in about 1821 from the copper-coloured staining of the lavas and tuffs in the area.

== Antarctic Specially Protected Area ==
The Coppermine Peninsula has a regime of special environmental protection under the Antarctic Treaty System. All land west of a north-south line across the isthmus between Carlota Cove and Coppermine Cove, has been designated an Antarctic Specially Protected Area (ASPA 112, formerly SPA 16). The area is biologically rich, supporting a wide range of plant communities with associated invertebrate fauna. An exceptional feature of the vegetation is a 1.5 ha closed carpet of the mosses Calliergon sarmentosum, Calliergidium austro-stramineum and Drepanocladus uncinatus, overlying a thick layer of wet moss peat. It is one of the largest continuous stands of moss in the Antarctic. There are large numbers of bryophytes and lichens as well as Antarctic hair grass. Birds breeding at the site include chinstrap penguins, southern giant petrels, Wilson's storm petrels Antarctic terns, kelp gulls and brown skuas. The isthmus is a haul-out site for southern elephant seals, Weddell seals and Antarctic fur seals.

== See also ==
- Alfatar Peninsula
- Robert Island

== Maps ==
- Chart of South Shetland including Coronation Island, &c. from the exploration of the sloop Dove in the years 1821 and 1822 by George Powell Commander of the same. Scale ca. 1:200000. London: Laurie, 1822.
- L.L. Ivanov. Antarctica: Livingston Island and Greenwich, Robert, Snow and Smith Islands. Scale 1:120000 topographic map. Troyan: Manfred Wörner Foundation, 2010. ISBN 978-954-92032-9-5 (First edition 2009. ISBN 978-954-92032-6-4)
