= Bilyana Island =

Island in the South Shetland Islands, Antarctica

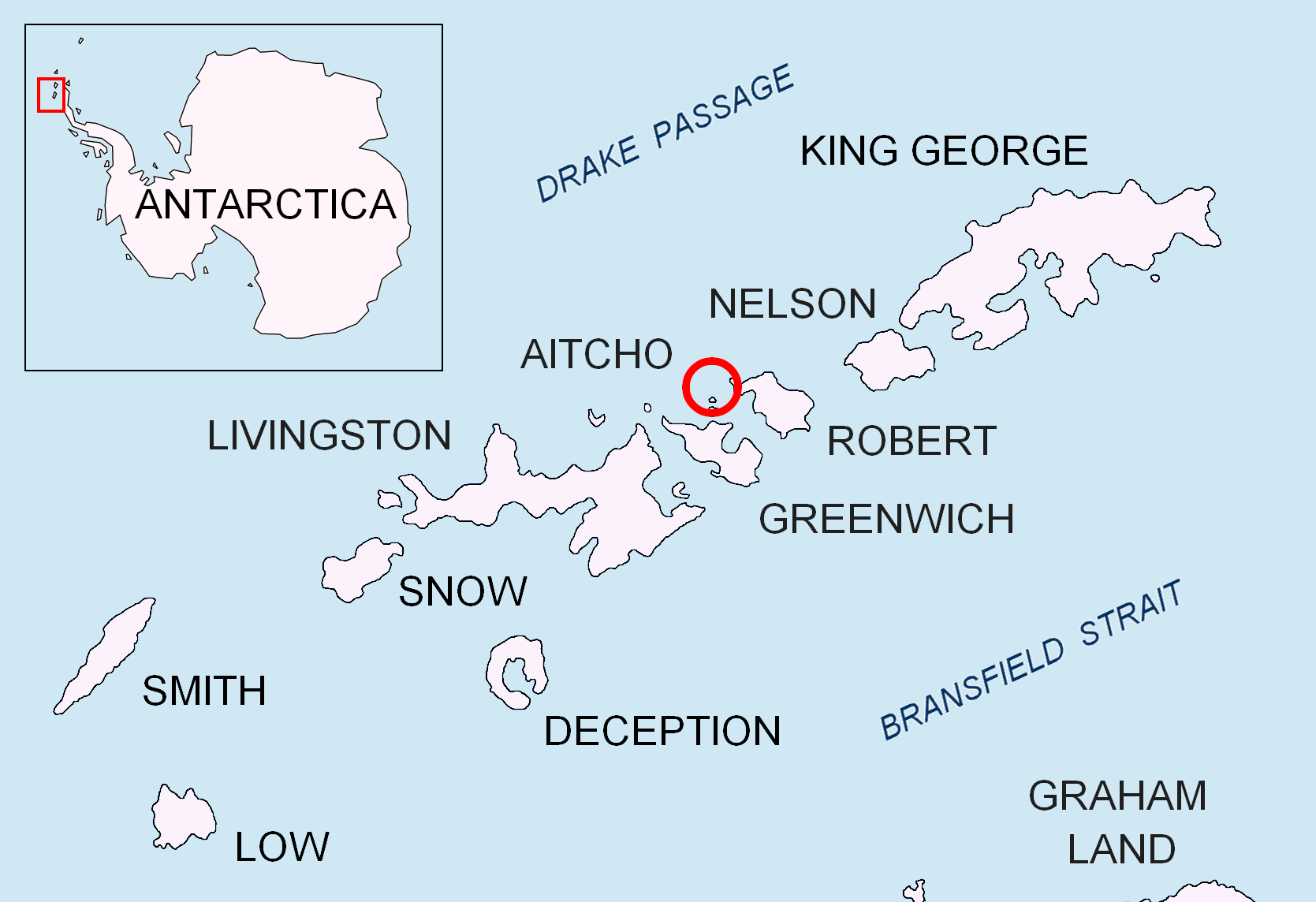
- Location of Bilyana Island in the South Shetland Islands

- Location within Antarctic Peninsula Location within Antarctica

Geography
- Coordinates: 62°23′05″S 59°45′47″W
- Archipelago: Aitcho group
- Area: 10 ha (25 acres)
- Length: 450 m (1480 ft)
- Width: 900 m (3000 ft)

Administration
- Administered under the Antarctic Treaty System

Topographic map of Livingston Island, Greenwich, Robert, Snow and Smith Islands.

Bilyana Island (Bulgarian: остров Биляна, romanized: ostrov Bilyana, IPA: [ˈɔstrov biˈʎanɐ]) is an ice-free island in the Aitcho group on the west side of English Strait in the South Shetland Islands, Antarctica. Extending 450 by 290 m (490 by 320 yd), surface area 10 hectares (25 acres). The area was visited by early 19th century sealers.

The island's name derives from Bilyana, a name from Bulgarian music folklore.

== Location ==
The midpoint is located at 62°23′05″S 59°45′47″W and the island is lying 100 m (110 yd) south of Jorge Island, 1.9 km (1.2 mi) north-northwest of Barrientos Island and 1.45 km (0.90 mi) northeast of Emeline Island (Bulgarian mapping in 2009).

== See also ==
- Aitcho Islands
- Composite Antarctic Gazetteer
- List of Antarctic islands south of 60° S
- SCAR
- South Shetland Islands
- Territorial claims in Antarctica
