= Alfatar Peninsula =

Peninsula in Antarctica

Coordinates: 62°22′15″S 59°39′38″W

Location of Robert Island in the South Shetland Islands.

Topographic map of Livingston Island, Greenwich, Robert, Snow and Smith Islands.

Alfatar Peninsula (Bulgarian: полуостров Алфатар, romanized: poluostrov Alfatar, IPA: [poɫuˈɔstrof ɐɫfɐˈtar]) is a peninsula extending 4 km in northeast-southwest direction and 2.8 km wide, forming the northwest extremity of Robert Island, South Shetland Islands. Bounded by Mitchell Cove, Carlota Cove, and Clothier Harbour. Linked to the 1.7 km long and 500 m wide Coppermine Peninsula to the west. The Onogur island group lies along the peninsula's northwest coast. Bulgarian early mapping in 2009.

The feature is named after the town of Alfatar in northeastern Bulgaria.

== Map ==
- L.L. Ivanov. Antarctica: Livingston Island and Greenwich, Robert, Snow and Smith Islands. Scale 1:120000 topographic map. Troyan: Manfred Wörner Foundation, 2010. ISBN 978-954-92032-9-5 (First edition 2009. ISBN 978-954-92032-6-4)
