= Dee Island =

Island in Antarctica

- Location of Greenwich Island in the South Shetland Islands

- Location within Antarctica

Geography
- Location: Antarctica
- Coordinates: 62°25′22.3″S 59°47′01″W
- Archipelago: South Shetland Islands
- Area: 197 ha (490 acres)
- Length: 1.9 km (1.18 mi)
- Width: 1.37 km (0.851 mi)
- Highest elevation: 190 m (620 ft)
- Highest point: Burro Peaks

Administration
- Administered under the Antarctic Treaty System

Demographics
- Population: Uninhabited

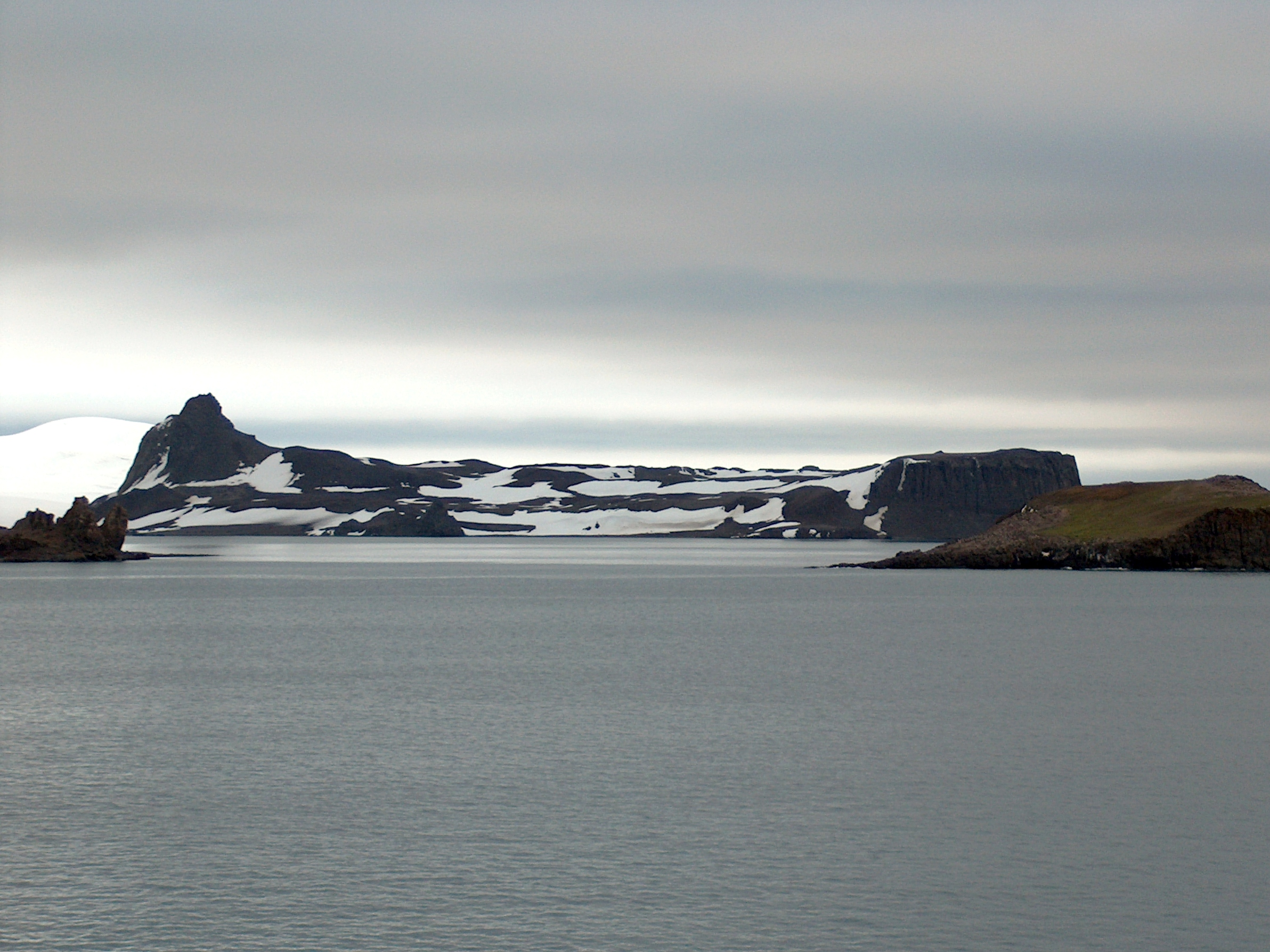
Dee Island from English Strait, with Burro Peaks on the left and Greenwich Island in the background

Dee Island is the ice-free island lying between Greenwich Island and Aitcho Islands in the South Shetland Islands, Antarctica and is separated from Greenwich Island to the south by the 850 m (930 yd) wide Orión Passage (62°26′17″S 59°47′45″W) and from Aitcho Islands to the northeast by the 1.1 km (0.68 mi) wide Villalón Passage. Extending 1.9 by 1.37 km (1.18 by 0.85 mi), with the conspicuous Burro Peaks (62°25′38.2″S 59°46′45″W) in the southeast rising to 190 m (620 ft), and surface area 197 hectares (490 acres). The small Montufar Island (62°25′36.6″S 59°45′24.9″W) and Araguez Island (62°25′57.8″S 59°47′15″W) are lying 650 m (710 yd) east of Dee Island and 200 m (220 yd) east of its southern tip Dragash Point respectively. The area was visited by 19th-century sealers.

Dee Island was charted and named, probably from its shape, by Discovery Investigations in 1935, while Montufar Island is named after a member of the Second Ecuadorian Antarctic Expedition who had an accident during the building of Pedro Vicente Maldonado Base.

== Location ==
The midpoint of Dee Island is located at 62°25′22.3″S 59°47′01″W. It lies 3.9 km (2.4 mi) east of Ongley Island, 850 m (930 yd) southeast of Sierra Island, 1.1 km (0.68 mi) southwest of Barrientos Island, 2.07 km (1.29 mi) west-southwest of Cecilia Island and 3.02 km (1.88 mi) northwest of Spark Point (British mapping in 1968, Chilean in 1971 and 1998, Argentine in 1980, and Bulgarian in 2005 and 2009).

== See also ==
- Aitcho Islands
- Composite Gazetteer of Antarctica
- Greenwich Island
- SCAR
- Territorial claims in Antarctica

== Map ==
Topographic map of Livingston Island, Greenwich, Robert, Snow and Smith Islands.

- L.L. Ivanov et al. Antarctica: Livingston Island and Greenwich Island, South Shetland Islands. Scale 1:100000 topographic map. Sofia: Antarctic Place-names Commission of Bulgaria, 2005.
