= Romeo Island =

Island in the South Shetland Islands

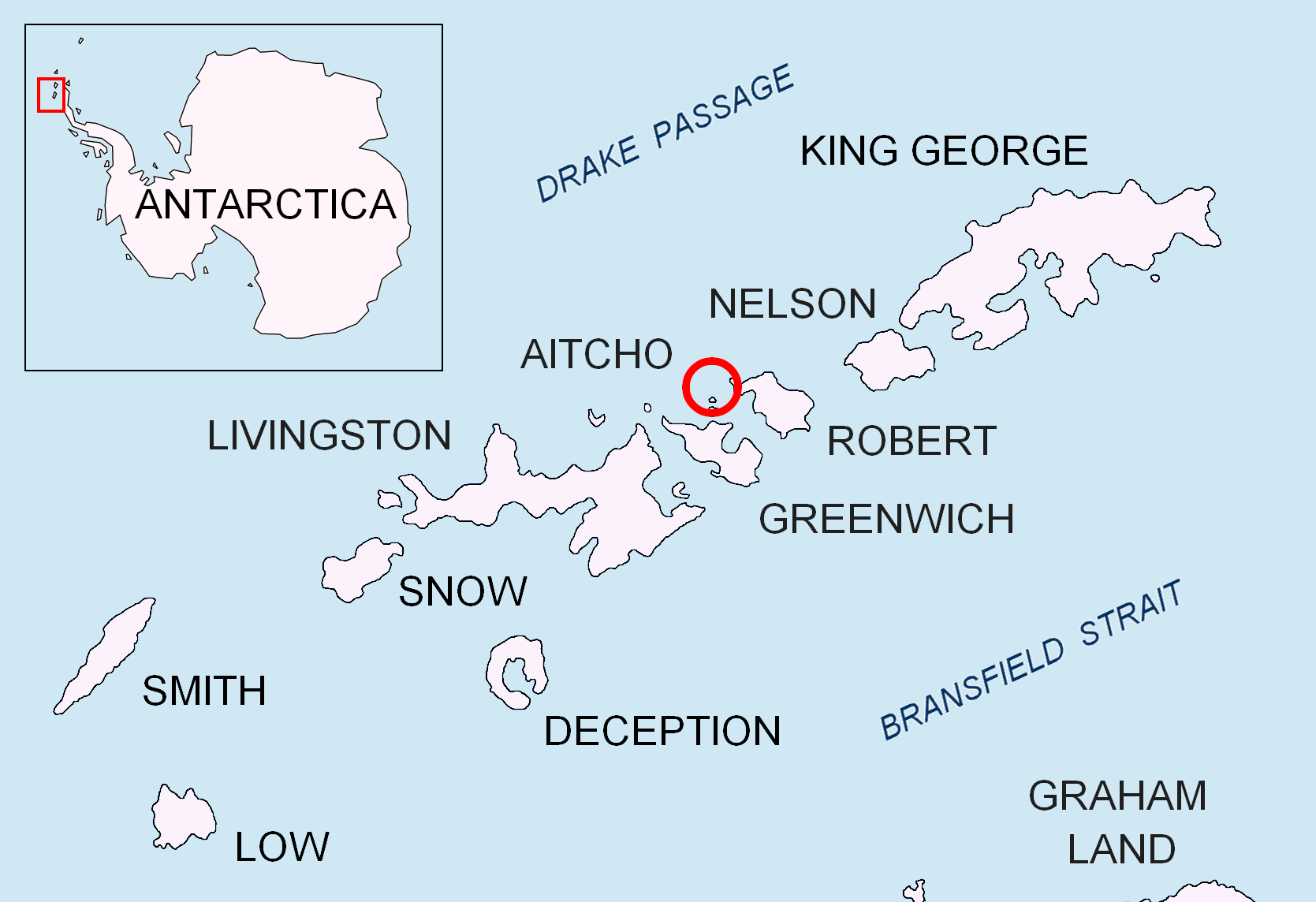
- Location of Aitcho Islands in the South Shetland Islands.

- Location within Antarctic Peninsula Location within Antarctica

Geography
- Location: Antarctica
- Coordinates: 62°22′34.7″S 59°55′30.6″W
- Archipelago: South Shetland Islands
- Area: 44 ha (110 acres)
- Length: 1.35 km (0.839 mi)
- Width: 0.47 km (0.292 mi)

Administration
- Antarctica
- Administered under the Antarctic Treaty System

Demographics
- Population: uninhabited

Romeo Island is a rocky island lying off the north coast of Greenwich Island and west of Aitcho Islands in the South Shetland Islands, Antarctica. Extending 1.35 km (0.84 mi) in west-northwest direction and 470 m (510 yd) wide, with a surface area of 44 hectares (110 acres). The area was visited by early 19th century sealers.

The feature is named after the British sealing ship Romeo under Captain James Johnson, which visited the South Shetlands in 1821–22, and moored in Clothier Harbour in March 1822.

== Location ==
The midpoint is located at 62°22′34.7″S 59°55′30.6″W and the island is lying 9.45 km (5.87 mi) northeast of Duff Point, Greenwich Island, 6.7 km (4.2 mi) southwest of Table Island, 4.05 km (2.52 mi) northwest of Stoker Island and 5.3 km (3.3 mi) north by west of Ongley Island (British mapping in 1962 and 1968, Chilean in 1971, Argentine in 1980, and Bulgarian in 2005 and 2009).

== See also ==
- Composite Antarctic Gazetteer
- Greenwich Island
- List of Antarctic islands south of 60° S
- SCAR
- South Shetland Islands
- Territorial claims in Antarctica

== Map ==
- L.L. Ivanov et al. Antarctica: Livingston Island and Greenwich Island, South Shetland Islands. Scale 1:100000 topographic map. Sofia: Antarctic Place-names Commission of Bulgaria, 2005.
