= Aitcho Islands (South Shetland Islands) =

Minor island group in Antarctica

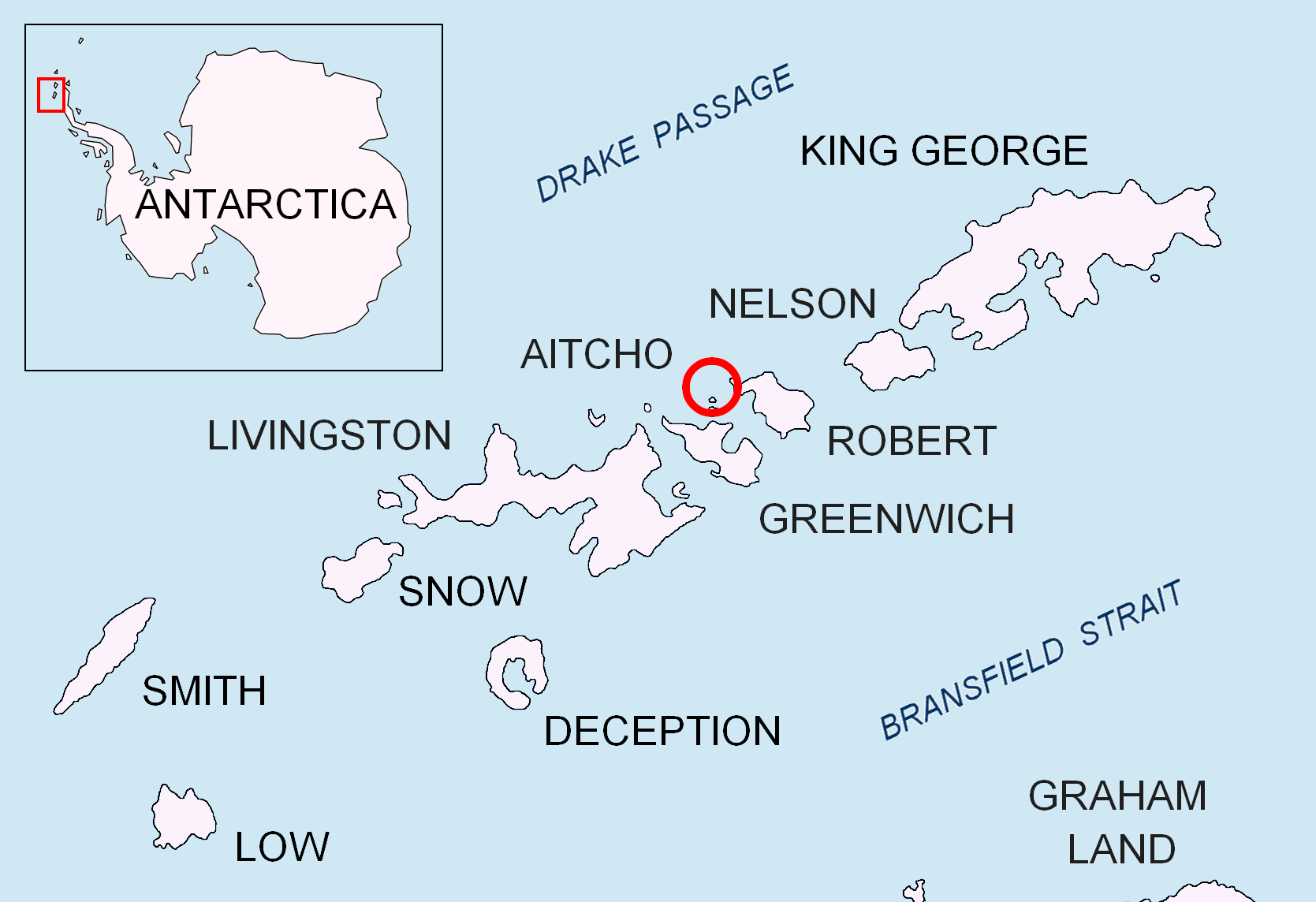
- Location of Aitcho Islands in the South Shetland Islands.

- Location within South Shetland Islands Location within Antarctica

Geography
- Location: Antarctica
- Coordinates: 62°23′29″S 59°46′10″W
- Archipelago: South Shetland Islands
- Area: 1.9204 km^{2} (0.7415 sq mi)

Administration
- Administered under the Antarctic Treaty System

Demographics
- Population: Uninhabited

The Aitcho Islands (‘Aitcho’ standing for ‘H.O.’ i.e. ‘Hydrographic Office’) are a group of minor islands on the west side of the north entrance to English Strait separating Greenwich Island and Robert Island in the South Shetland Islands, Antarctica, which are situated between Dee Island to the south and Table Island to the north. The group is separated from Dee Island and Sierra Island to the southwest by Villalón Passage (62°24′48.3″S 59°46′12.3″W). The area was visited by early 19th century sealers operating from nearby Clothier Harbour. During the austral summer the islands are often visited by Antarctic cruise ships with tourists who land to watch wildlife.

The islands were mapped in 1935 during the oceanographic investigations carried out by the Discovery Committee, and named after the Hydrographic Office of the UK Admiralty. Some of the island names were given by Chilean Antarctic expeditions between 1949 and 1951.

== Islands ==
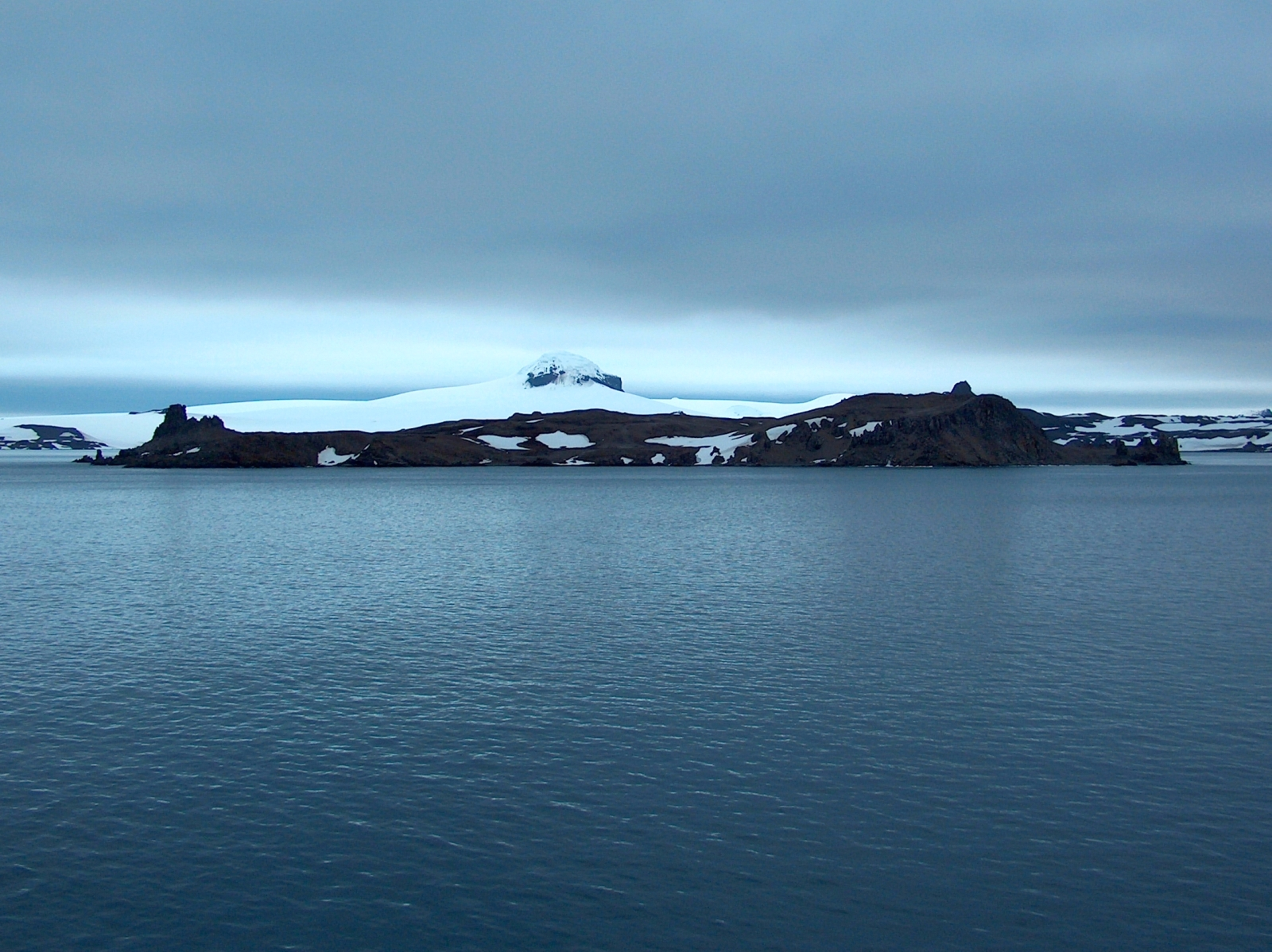
Cecilia Island from English Strait.

Topographic map of Livingston Island, Greenwich, Robert, Snow and Smith Islands, featuring Aitcho Islands.

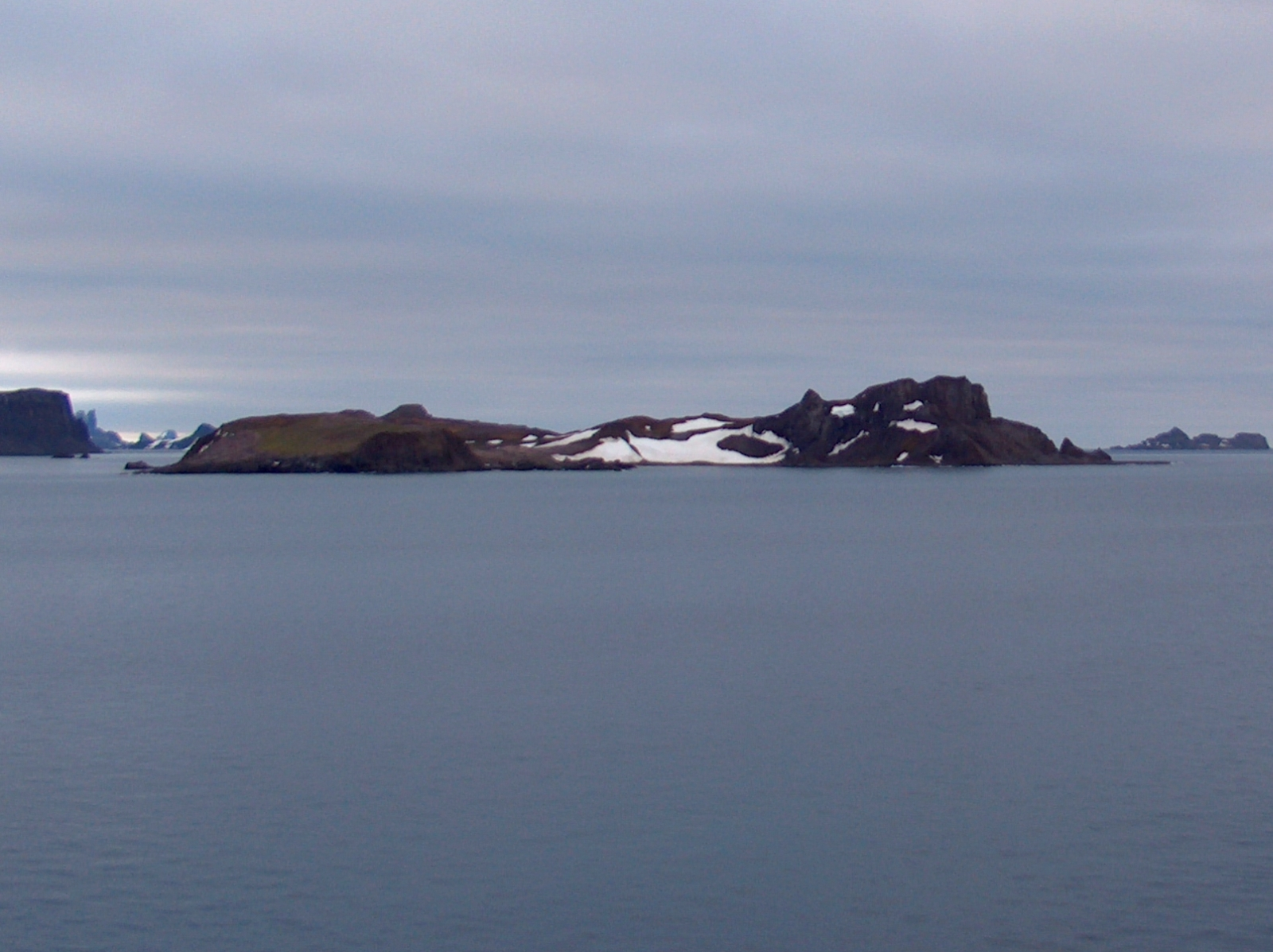
Barrientos Island from English Strait.

The islands and some notable rocks of the Aitcho group are:

- Barrientos Island
- Bilyana Island
- Cecilia Island, named Isla Torre by Chile
- Chaos Reef
- Cheshire Rock
- Emeline Island
- Jorge Island
- Kilifarevo Island
- Morris Rock
- Okol Rocks
- Pasarel Island
- Passage Rock
- Riksa Islands

== Flora and fauna ==
Among the bird species found on the islands are chinstrap and gentoo penguins, southern giant petrels, and skuas. Southern elephant seals are among the larger life forms. Other seals in the region include the Antarctic fur seal and the Weddell seal. There are also a wide variety of lichens and mosses reported.

Regular wildlife surveys are conducted to assess the populations of birdlife on the islands.

== See also ==
- Composite Antarctic Gazetteer
- Greenwich Island
- List of Antarctic islands south of 60° S
- Robert Island
- SCAR
- South Shetland Islands
- Territorial claims in Antarctica

== Maps ==
- L.L. Ivanov et al., Antarctica: Livingston Island and Greenwich Island, South Shetland Islands (from English Strait to Morton Strait, with illustrations and ice-cover distribution), 1:100000 scale topographic map, Antarctic Place-names Commission of Bulgaria, Sofia, 2005
- L.L. Ivanov. Antarctica: Livingston Island and Greenwich, Robert, Snow and Smith Islands. Scale 1:120000 topographic map. Troyan: Manfred Wörner Foundation, 2010. ISBN 978-954-92032-9-5 (First edition 2009. ISBN 978-954-92032-6-4)
