= Sierra Island =

Island in the South Shetland Islands, Antarctica

- Location of Greenwich Island in the South Shetland Islands

- Location within Antarctic Peninsula Location within Antarctica

Geography
- Location: Antarctica
- Coordinates: 62°24′S 59°48′W
- Archipelago: South Shetland Islands
- Area: 14 ha (35 acres)
- Length: 0.5 mi (0.8 km)

Administration
- Antarctica
- Administered under the Antarctic Treaty System

Demographics
- Population: uninhabited

Sierra Island (62°24′S 59°48′W) is a narrow island which is marked by a series of small elevations throughout its length, lying 0.5 miles (0.8 km) northwest of Dee Island and north of Greenwich Island in the South Shetland Islands, Antarctica. Surface area 14 hectares (35 acres).

Named by the 5th Chilean Antarctic Expedition, 1950–51, after Sgt. Victor Sierra, sick-bay attendant of the patrol ship Lientur on the expedition.

== See also ==
- Composite Antarctic Gazetteer
- List of Antarctic islands south of 60° S
- SCAR
- Territorial claims in Antarctica
