= Fort William (Robert Island) =

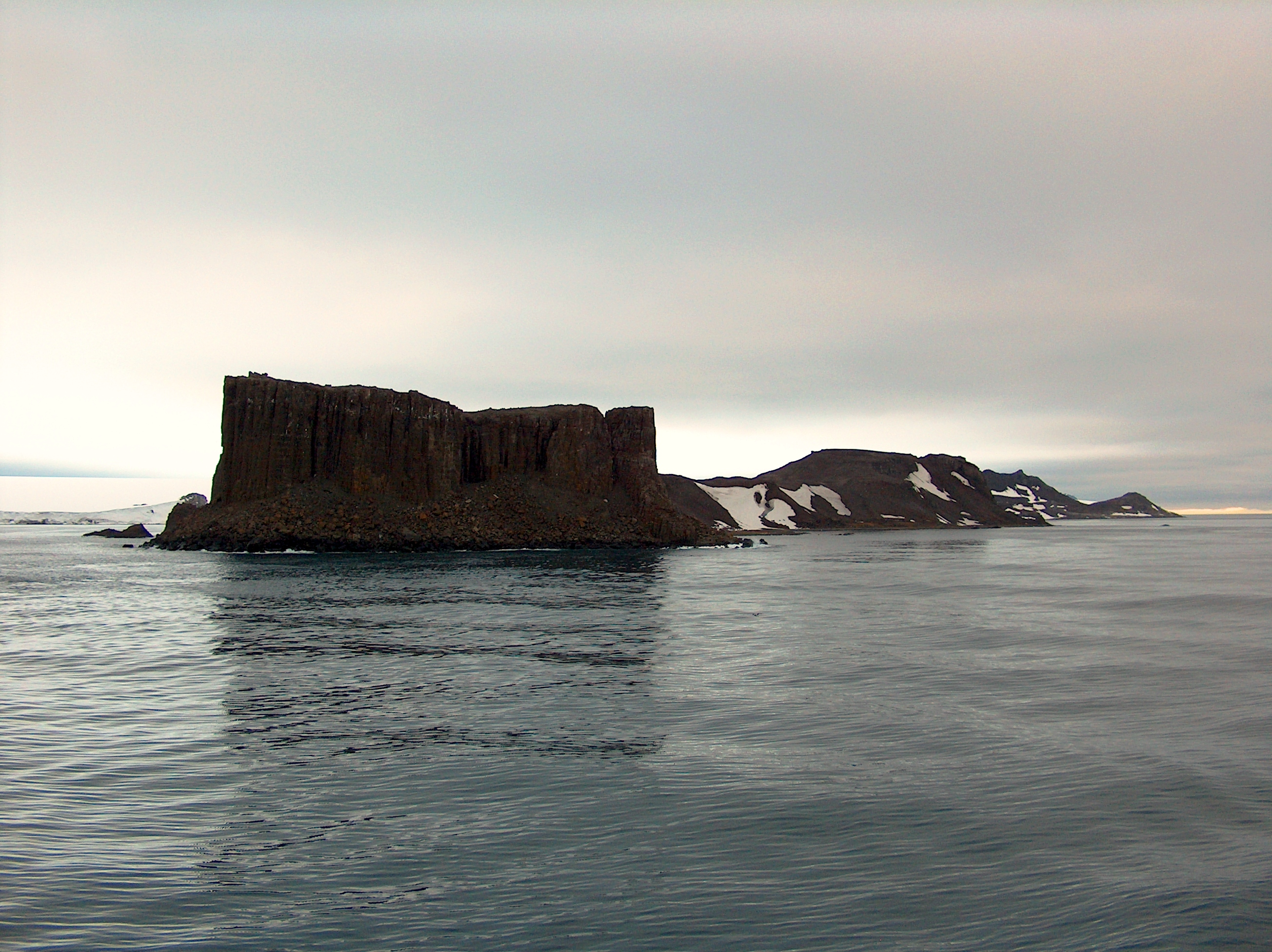
- Fort William Point in the foreground, as viewed from English Strait

- Location of Robert Island in the South Shetland Islands

Geography
- Location: Antarctica
- Coordinates: 62°22′13″S 59°43′33″W
- Archipelago: South Shetland Islands

Administration
- Antarctica
- Administered under the Antarctic Treaty System

Demographics
- Population: 0
- Fort William Lighthouse
- Foundation: concrete base
- Construction: fiber glass tower
- Height: 3 m (9.8 ft)
- Shape: cylindrical tower with lantern
- Markings: white and red horizontal bands tower
- Power source: solar power
- Focal height: 10 m (33 ft)
- Range: 5 nmi (9.3 km; 5.8 mi)
- Characteristic: Fl W 5s

Fort William Point is the conspicuous flat-topped rocky headland forming the northwest extremity of Coppermine Peninsula and Robert Island in the South Shetland Islands, Antarctica. The point is a northwest entrance point of English Strait and forms the west side of the entrance to Carlota Cove.

The feature was named by the early 19th century sealers who used it as a landmark for entering English Strait from the north.

== Location ==
The point is located at 62°22′13″S 59°43′33″W which is 7.2 km (4.5 mi) southwest of Catharina Point, 8.18 km (5.08 mi) north of Spark Point, 3.67 km (2.28 mi) north-northeast of Barrientos Island, 1.82 km (1.13 mi) east of Okol Rocks and 4.74 km (2.95 mi) southeast of Table Island (British mapping in 1821, 1962 and 1968, Argentine in 1949, Soviet Union in 1961, Chilean in 1974, and Bulgarian in 2009).

== See also ==
- List of lighthouses in Antarctica
- Composite Antarctic Gazetteer
- Robert Island
- SCAR
- South Shetland Islands
- Territorial claims in Antarctica

== Maps ==
- L.L. Ivanov. Antarctica: Livingston Island and Greenwich, Robert, Snow and Smith Islands. Scale 1:120000 topographic map. Troyan: Manfred Wörner Foundation, 2009. ISBN 978-954-92032-6-4

Topographic map of Livingston Island, Greenwich, Robert, Snow and Smith Islands
