= English Strait =

Strait in the South Shetland Islands

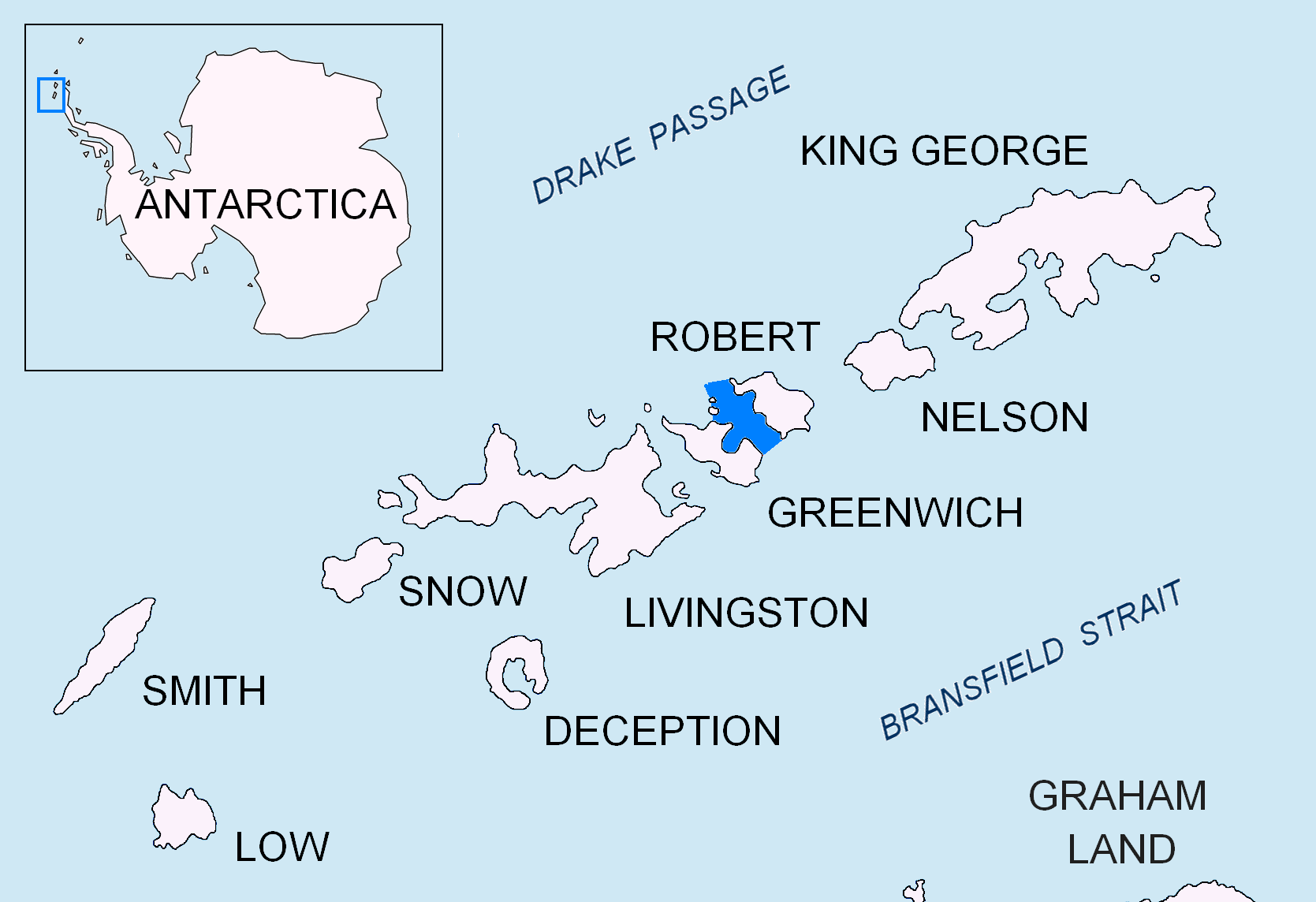
Location of English Strait in the South Shetland Islands.

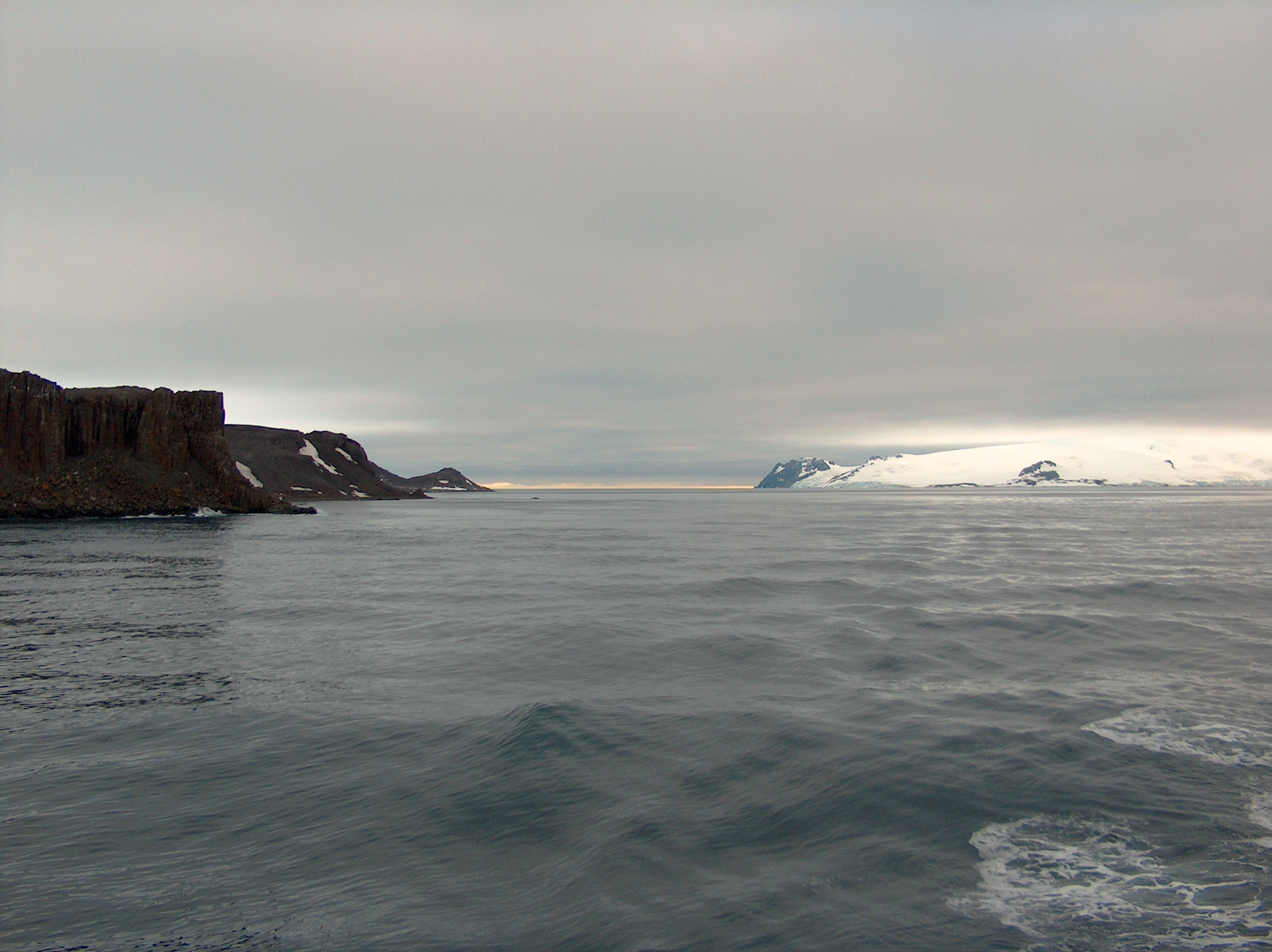
English Strait, with Robert Island on the left and Greenwich Island on the right.

English Strait is the 10.5-mile (17-km) long and 1.2-mile (2-km) wide strait lying between Greenwich Island and Robert Island in the South Shetland Islands, Antarctica. Trending southeast-northwest, and entered between Santa Cruz Point and Edwards Point in the south, and Fort William Point and Okol Rocks, Aitcho Islands in the north. The name dates back to 1822 and is established in international usage.

== Location ==
English Strait is located at 62°26′00″S 59°38′00″W. British mapping in 1821, 1822 and 1968, Chilean in 1971, Argentine in 1980, and Bulgarian in 2009.

== Map ==
Topographic map of Livingston Island, Greenwich, Robert, Snow and Smith Islands.

L.L. Ivanov. Antarctica: Livingston Island and Greenwich, Robert, Snow and Smith Islands. Scale 1:120000 topographic map. Troyan: Manfred Wörner Foundation, 2010. ISBN 978-954-92032-9-5 (First edition 2009. ISBN 978-954-92032-6-4)
