= List of archipelagos =

This is a list of archipelagos, organised by oceans, then seas, then finally arranged alphabetically, with geographically isolated islands included as well.

== Arctic Ocean ==
Archipelagos of the Arctic Ocean:

- Arctic Alaska
  - Kasegaluk Lagoon Islands
  - Midway Islands
  - Pye Islands
  - Pencil Islands
  - Seahorse Islands
- Bear Island
- Canadian Arctic Archipelago
  - Akvitlak Islands
  - Arvalik Islands
  - Astronomical Society Islands
  - Bate Islands
  - Belcher Islands
  - Berens Islands
  - Beverly Islands
  - Bird Islands
  - Bjorne Islands
  - Cape Chidley Islands
  - Cape Hope Islands
  - Carter Islands
  - Champan Islands
  - Cheere Islands
  - Clarence Islands
  - Copeland Islands
  - Crown Prince Islands
  - Digges Islands
  - Duke of York Archipelago
  - Finlayson Islands
  - Harrison Islands
  - Hay Islands
  - Hecla and Fury Islands
  - Hovgaard Islands
  - Keith Islands
  - Leo Islands
  - Low Islands
  - Martin Islands
  - Miles Islands
  - Minto Islands
  - Nastapoka Islands
  - Nauyan Islands
  - Nuvuk Islands
  - Outcast Islands
  - Outpost Islands
  - Paint Hills Islands
  - Plover Islands
  - Queen Elizabeth Islands
    - Cheyne Islands
    - Fay Islands
    - Findlay Group
    - Gretha Islands
    - Marvin Islands
    - Parry Islands
      - Berkeley Islands
        - Hosken Islands
    - Sverdrup Islands
  - Sisters Islands
  - Tasmania Islands
  - Tennent Islands
  - Twin Islands
  - Saneruarsuk Islands
  - Solomons Temple Islands
  - Spicer Islands
  - Strutton Islands
- Greenland
  - Achton Friis Islands
  - Bonsall Islands
  - Cape Farewell Archipelago
  - Carey Islands
  - Danske Islands
  - Franske Islands
  - Harvard Islands
  - Upernavik Archipelago
- Jan Mayen
- Northern Norway
  - Lofoten
  - Vegaøyan
  - Vesterålen

Russian Arctic islands

- Arkticheskiy Institut Islands
- Ayon Island
- Begichev Islands
- Bely Island
- Bolshoy Begichev Island
- Dunay Islands
- Izvestiy TSIK Islands
- Faddey Islands
- Firnley Islands
- Franz Josef Land
- Heiberg Islands
- Kamennye Islands
- Kirov Islands
- Kolguyev Island
- Komsomolskaya Pravda Islands
- Labyrintovye Islands
- Medvezhyi Islands
- Mona Islands
- New Siberian Islands
  - Anzhu Islands
  - De Long Islands
  - Lyakhovsky Islands
- Nordenskiöld Archipelago
- Novaya Zemlya
- Oleny Island
- Plavnikovye Islands
- Routan Islands
- Severnaya Zemlya
  - Krasnoflotskiye Islands
  - Sedov Archipelago
- Saint Peter Islands
- Scott Hansen Islands
- Serykh Gusey Islands
- Shelonsky Islands
- Shokalsky Island
- Solovetsky Islands
- Tillo Islands
- Ushakov Island
- Vilkitsky Island (Kara Sea)
- Wiese Island
- Wrangel Island
- Zveroboy Islands

Svalbard

- Castrénøyane
- Repøyane
- Ryke Yseøyane
- Sabine Islands
- Thousand Islands

== Atlantic Ocean ==
Archipelagos of the Atlantic Ocean:

=== Along the coast of Europe ===
- Berlengas
  - Estelas Islets
  - Farilhões-Forcados Islets
- British Isles
  - England
    - Farne Islands
    - Isles of Scilly
  - Ireland
    - Aran Islands
    - Blasket Islands
    - Copeland Islands
    - Inishkea Islands
    - Magharee Islands
    - Skellig Islands
  - Scotland
    - Hebrides
      - Inner Hebrides
        - Ascrib Islands
        - Crowlin Islands
        - Slate Islands
        - Small Isles
        - Treshnish Isles
      - Outer Hebrides
        - Flannan Isles
        - Haskeir Eagach
        - Monach Islands
        - St Kilda
    - Islands of Fleet
    - Islands of the Clyde
    - Orkney
    - Shetland Islands
      - North Isles
      - Scalloway Islands
      - Out Skerries
    - Summer Isles
- Channel Islands
  - Chausey
- Columbretes Islands
- Cíes Islands
- Danish Isles
- Faroe Islands
  - Norðoyar
- Formigues Islands
- Glénan Islands
- Iceland
  - Vestmannaeyjar
- Lofoten
- Medes Islands
- East Frisian Islands
- Heligoland
- North Frisian Islands
- West Frisian Islands

=== Along the coast of Africa ===
- Arquipélago dos Bijagós
- Baboon Islands
- Bight of Bonny Islands
  - Annobón
  - Bioko
  - São Tomé e Príncipe
- Bissagos Islands
- Islas de Elobey
- Islas Kai Hai
- Saint Helena
- Tristan da Cunha
- Turtle Islands, Sierra Leone
- Îles de Los

=== Along the coast of the Americas ===
- Abrolhos Archipelago
- Belcher Islands
- Bermuda Islands
- Bocas del Toro
- Broken Islands
- Corn Islands
- Cranberry Isles
- Diego Ramírez Islands
- Falkland Islands
  - Arch Islands
  - Jason Islands
- Fernando de Noronha
- Flat Islands, Bovista Bay, Newfoundland and Labrador Flat Islands*
- Florida Keys
- Hermite Islands
- Ildefonso Islands
- Karl Oom Islands
- Magdalen Islands (Les Îles-de-la-Madeleine)
- Marcopeet Islands
- Mingan Archipelago
- Outer Lands (New England-New York islands)
- Payne Islands
- Plover Islands
- Puerto Rico
  - Mona Islands
- Punuk Islands
- Saint Peter and Paul Rocks
- Salvation's Islands
- San Blas Islands
- Thimble Islands
- Tierra del Fuego
- Trindade and Martin Vaz
- Wollaston Islands

=== Macaronesia ===
Archipelagos of Macaronesia:

- Azores
  - Formigas
- Canary Islands
  - Chinijo Archipelago
- Cape Verde
  - Barlavento Islands
  - Sotavento Islands
- Madeira Islands
  - Desertas Islands
  - Savage Islands

=== Baltic Sea, Gulf of Bothnia and Gulf of Finland ===
Archipelagos of the Baltic Sea, Gulf of Bothnia and Gulf of Finland

- Åland
- Archipelago Sea
- Beryozovye Islands
- Blekinge Archipelago
- Bothnian Bay archipelago
  - Haparanda archipelago
  - Kalix archipelago
  - Luleå archipelago
  - Piteå archipelago
  - Skellefteå archipelago
- Froan
- Kvarken Archipelago
- Norrbotten Archipelago
- Oskarshamn archipelago
- Pakri Islands
- South Funen Archipelago

- Swedish East Coast Archipelago
  - Gräsö archipelago
  - Oskarshamn archipelago
  - Stockholm Archipelago
    - Rödlöga archipelago
    - Skarv Archipelago
  - Södermanland archipelago
  - Öregrund archipelago
  - Östergötland archipelago
    - Gryt archipelago
    - Sankt Anna's Archipelago
    - Tjust Archipelago
  - Småland archipelago
- Turku archipelago
- West Estonian archipelago

=== Caribbean Sea and the Gulf of Mexico ===
Archipelagos of the Caribbean Sea and the Gulf of Mexico

- Archipelago of San Bernando
- Cayman Islands
- Florida Keys
- Rosario Islands
- Swan Islands
- West Indies: Antilles
  - Greater Antilles
    - Cuban Islands
      - Colorados Archipelago
      - Cannarreos Archipelago
      - Jardines de la Reina
      - Sabana-Camagüey Archipelago
    - Puerto Rican Islands
  - Lesser Antilles
    - Leeward Islands
      - Petite Terre islands
      - Virgin Islands
        - British Virgin Islands
          - Dog Islands
          - Little Sisters
          - Seal Dog Islands
        - US Virgin Islands
      - Îles des Saintes
    - Leeward Antilles
      - ABC Islands
      - Las Aves Archipelago
      - Los Hermanos Archipelago
      - Los Monjes Archipelago
      - Los Roques Archipelago
      - Los Testigos Islands
    - Lucayan Archipelago
      - Abacos Islands
      - Bimini Islands
      - Berry Islands
      - Cat Cays
      - Deadman Cays
      - Double Headed Shot Cays
      - Elbow Cays
      - Factory Cays
      - Inagua Islands
      - Plana Cays
      - Schooner Cays
      - Water Cays
      - Victory Cays
        - Turks and Caicos
          - Six Hill Cays
    - Windward Islands
      - Brooks Rocks
      - Cow And Calves Islands
      - Grenadines

=== Caspian Sea ===
Archipelagos of the Caspian Sea:

- Baku Archipelago
- Podvodnyye Islands
- Tuledi Araldary
- Tyuleniy Archipelago

=== Mediterranean Sea ===
Archipelagos of the Mediterranean Sea

- Aegean Islands
  - Ayvalık Islands
  - Cyclades
  - Dodecanese
  - Fournoi Korseon
  - Oinousses
  - Saronic Islands
  - Sporades
  - Tavşan Islands
- Aegadian Islands
- Aeolian Islands
- Alhucemas Islands
- Ayvalık
- Balearic Islands
- Brijuni
- Campanian Archipelago
  - Phlegrean Islands
- Cres-Lošinj Archipelago
- Elaphiti Islands
- Galite Islands
- Ionian Islands
- Kerkennah Islands
- Kornati
- Ksamil Islands
- Maddalena Archipelago
- Maltese Islands
- Mola Islands
- Paklinski Islands
- Pelagian Islands
- Phlegraean Islands
- Pityusic Islands
- Pontine Islands
- Rovinj Archipelago
- St Paul's Islands
- Tremiti Islands
- Tuscan Archipelago
- Venetian Lagoon
- Zadar Archipelago

=== North Sea ===
Archipelagos of the North Sea:

- Frisian Islands (or Wadden Islands)
  - Danish Wadden Sea Islands
  - East Frisian Islands
  - North Frisian Islands
  - North Frisian Barrier Islands
  - West Frisian Islands
- Gothenburg Archipelago
- Vega Islands (Vegaøyan)

== Bering Strait ==
Archipelagos of the Bering Strait:

- Diomede Islands

== Indian Ocean ==
Archipelagos of the Indian Ocean:

=== Along the coast of Africa ===
- Bajuni Islands
- Cargados Carajos Shoals (Saint Brandon)
- Choazil Islands (Malandzamia Islands)
- Comoro Islands
- Glorioso Islands
- Khuriya Muriya Islands
- Mascarene Islands
- Mayotte
- Quirimbas Islands
- Seychelles
  - African Banks
  - Aldabra Group
  - La Digue
    - Inner Islands
  - Outer Islands
    - Alphonse Group
    - Amirante Islands
    - Farquhar Group
- Socotra Archipelago
- Zanzibar Archipelago
- Mafia Archipelago
- Songosongo Archipelago

=== Along the coast of Asia ===
- Ad Dimaniyat Islands
- Andaman Islands and Nicobar Islands
  - Andaman Islands
  - Ritchie's Archipelago
    - Twin Islands
  - Nicobar Islands
- Ashmore and Cartier Islands
- Bahrain Archipelago
- Cocos (Keeling) Islands
- Hawar Islands
- Langkawi
- Lakshadweep (Laccadives)
- Logo Islands (artificial)
- Logo Islands (other artificial one)
- Maldives
- Mentawai Islands
- Nurana Islands
- Mergui Archipelago
- Palm Jumeirah (artificial)
- The World (artificial)

=== Along the coast of Australia ===
- Bonaparte Archipelago
- Buccaneer Archipelago
- Houtman Abrolhos
  - Wallabi Group
  - Easter Group
  - Pelsaert Group
- Lacepede Islands
- Lamu Archipelago
- Mary Anne Group
- Recherche Archipelago

=== Outlying archipelagos ===
- Chagos Archipelago
  - Eagle Islands
- Crozet Islands
- Kerguelen Islands
- Prince Edward Islands

=== Red Sea ===
Archipelagos in the Red Sea:

- Dahlak Archipelago
- Farasan Islands
- Hanish Islands
- Hurghada Archipelago
- Sa'ad ad-Din Islands
- Seven Brothers Islands
- Suakin Archipelago
- Zubair Group

== Pacific Ocean ==
Archipelagos of the Pacific Ocean:

=== Along the coast of the Americas ===
- Aleutian Islands
  - Andreanof Islands
  - Bolshoi Islands
  - Delarof Islands
  - Fox Islands
  - Islands of Four Mountains
  - Komandorski Islands
  - Kudomin Islands
  - Near Islands
  - Rat Islands
  - Semidi Islands
  - Shumagin Islands
- Alexander Archipelago
- Archipelagoes of Patagonia
  - Guaitecas Archipelago (Archipiélago de las Guaitecas)
  - Guayaneco Archipelago (Archipiélago Guayaneco)
  - Chonos Archipelago (Archipiélago de los Chonos)
  - Diego Ramírez Islands (Islas Diego Ramírez)
  - Katalalixar Archipielago
  - Madre de Dios Archipelago
  - Pearl Islands
  - Queen Adelaide Archipelago (Archipelago de La Reina Adelaida)
  - Tierra del Fuego (Archipiélago de Tierra del Fuego)
  - Wollaston Islands (Islas Wollaston)
  - Wellington Archipelago
- Baranof Archipelago
- Barren Islands
- Bird Rocks
- Broughton Archipelago
- Channel Islands of California
- Chiloé Archipelago (Archipiélago de Chiloé)
- Chinchas Islands
- Chriswell Islands
- Coronado Islands
- Desventuradas Islands
- Easter Island
- Farallon Islands
- Flat Islands
- Galápagos Islands (Archipiélago de Colón)
- Goose Group
- Gulf Islands
- Haida Gwaii
- Islas Secas
- Juan Fernández Islands
- Minx Islands
- Pleiades Islands
- Pribilof Islands
- Renell Islands
- Revillagigedo Islands
- San Juan Islands

=== Along the coast of Asia ===
- Amakusa Islands
- Banzhou Archipelago
- Chàm Islands
- Côn Đảo
- Changsan Archipelago
- Chastye Islands
- Coco Islands
- Chumphon Islands
- Eugénie Archipelago
- Fishers' Islands
- Japanese archipelago (including Sakhalin)
  - Bonin Islands
  - Habomi Islands
  - Nanpō Islands
  - Ryukyu Archipelago
    - Okinawa Islands
      - Aguni Islands
      - Iheya-Izena Islands
      - Kerama Islands
      - Yokatsu Islands
    - Sakishima Islands
      - Miyako Islands
      - Yaeyama Islands
    - Satsunan Islands
      - Amami Islands
      - Tokara Islands
      - Ōsumi Islands
    - Daitō Islands
- Indonesian Archipelago (Island country)
  - Asia Islands
  - Ayu Islands
  - Bacan Islands
  - Balabalagan Islands
  - Banda Arc
  - Banda Islands
  - Banggai Islands
    - Bowokan Islands
  - Bangka Belitung Islands
  - Banyak Islands
  - Barat Daya Islands
    - Babar Islands
  - Boo Islands
  - Derawan Islands
  - Erà Islands
  - Gili Islands
  - Gorong Archipelago
  - Hinako Islands
  - Kangean Islands
  - Karakaralong Islands
  - Karimata Islands
  - Karimun Islands
  - Kepulauan Mentawai
  - Krakatoa Archipelago
  - Kuran Islands
  - Laut Kecil Islands
  - Lease Islands
  - Leti Islands
  - Lingga Islands
  - Lucipara Islands
  - Maluku Islands
    - Aru Islands
    - Kai Islands
    - Penyu Islands
    - Watubela Archipelago
  - Masalembu Islands
  - Mentawai Islands Regency
  - Nias Islands
    - Batu Islands
  - Obi Islands
  - Spermonde Archipelago (Pabbring Islands)
  - Raja Ampat Islands
    - Fam Islands
  - Riau Archipelago
    - Tudjuh Archipelago
      - Anambas Islands
      - Badas Islands
      - Natuna Islands
        - Bunguran Islands
        - South Natuna
      - Tambelan Archipelago
    - Riau Islands (separate from the Riau Archipelago)
  - Sabalana Islands
  - Sangihe Islands
  - Schouten Islands (Known as Biak Islands and Geelvink Islands)
  - Selayar Islands
    - Macan Islands
    - Taka Bonerate Islands
  - Sula Islands Also Known As Xulla Islands
  - Sunda Islands
    - Greater Sunda Islands
    - Lesser Sunda Islands
      - Alor Archipelago
      - Solor Archipelago
      - Tanimbar Islands
  - Talaud Islands
  - Tayandu Islands
  - Tengah Islands
  - Thousand Islands (Indonesia)
  - Togian Islands
  - Tukangbesi Islands
  - Wakatobi Regency
  - Widi Islands
- Kinmen Islands
- Koh Rong Archipelago
- Korean Archipelago
- Kuril Islands
- Liancourt Rocks
- Miaodao Archipelago
- Ogasawara Islands
- Penghu Islands
- Philippine Islands (Island nation)
  - Baco Islands
  - Batanes
  - Babuyan Islands
    - Balintang Islands
  - Calamian Islands
    - Semirana Islands
  - Cuyo Archipelago
  - Mangsee Islands
  - Spratly Islands
  - Sulu Archipelago
    - Sangboy Islands
  - Tangawayan Islands
  - Tinalisayan Islets
  - Visayas
    - Camotes Islands
    - Coaman Islets
    - Cuatro Islands
    - Dinagat Islands
      - Cabilan Islands
    - Gigantes Islands
    - Olango Island Group
- Poulo Wai islands
- Rimsky-Korsakov Archipelago
- Shantar Islands
- Shengsi Islands
- South China Sea Islands
  - Paracel Islands
    - Amphitrite Group
    - Crescent Group
      - Duncan Islands
  - Spratly Islands
  - Zhongsha Islands
- Taehwa-Do
- Volcano Islands
- Yam Islands

=== Oceania ===
==== Australia ====
- Archipelago of the Recherche
- Beagle Islands
- Bird Isles
- Bonaparte Archipelago
- Breaksea Islands
- Buccaneer Archipelago
- Bustard Islands
- Celery Top Islands
- Corkwood Islands
- Crocodile Islands
- Dampier Archipelago
- Easter Group
- Fairfax Islands
- Fig Islands
- Fisherman Islands
- Furneaux Group
- Glennie Group
- Governor Islands
- Hakea Islands
- High Cliffy Islands
- Home Islands
- Hunter Islands
- Islands on the Great Barrier Reef
  - Sir James Smith Group
    - Anchor Islands
  - Barrow Islands
  - Bird Isles
  - Brook Islands
  - Bunker Group
  - Capricorn Group
  - Duke Islands
  - Fairfax Islands
  - Family Islands
  - Frankland Islands
  - Home Islands
  - Hoskyn Islands
  - Ingot Islets
  - Jeffreys Rocks
  - Kippel Islands
  - Moonboom Islands
  - Red Cliff Islands
  - Repulse Islands
  - Torres Strait Islands
    - Duncan Islands
  - Turtle Group
  - Two Brothers
  - Two Islands
  - Whitsunday Islands
- Investigator Group
  - Pearson Isles
- Kent Group
- Kingsmill Islands
- Leschenaultia Islands
- Louis Islands
- Maatsuyker Islands
- Mangrove Islands
- Mart Islands
- Middle Pasco Islands
- Minnieritchie Islands
- Montebello Islands
- Moonboon Islands
- Mud Islands
- Mulga Islands
- North East Isles
- Nuyts Archipelago
- Pearson Islands
- Pelsaert Group
- Peron Islands
- Quandong Islands
- Saint Alouarm Islands
- Sir Graham Moore Islands
- Sir Joseph Banks Group
- Smith Islands
- Tasmania
- The English Company Islands
- Tiwi Islands
- Tory Islands
- Twin Peak Islands
- Vernon Islands
- Wallabi Group
- Wellesley Islands
  - South Wellesley Islands
- Whitsunday Islands

==== Melanesia ====
- Bismarck Archipelago
  - Admiralty Islands
  - Arawe Islands
  - Duke of York Islands
  - Feni Islands
  - Hermit Archipelago
  - Kaniet Islands
  - Lihir Group
  - Ninigo Islands
  - Schouten Islands
  - St Matthias Islands
  - Tabar Group
  - Tami Islands
  - Tanga Islands
  - Vitu Islands
- D'Entrecasteaux Islands
- Fiji Islands
  - Lau Islands (Also known as Lau Group, Eastern Group and Eastern Archipelago)
  - Marmanuca Islands
  - Moala Islands
  - Rotuma Group
  - Viti Levu Group
  - Yasawa Islands
- Louisiade Archipelago
  - Bentley Islands
  - Dumolin Islands
- New Caledonia (Kanaky)
  - Loyalty Islands
- New Guinea
- Shepherd Islands
- Solomon Islands
  - Solomon Islands (country)
    - Duff Islands
    - Santa Cruz Islands
    - Nggela Islands
    - New Georgia Islands
    - Reef Islands
    - Russell Islands
    - Shortland Islands
    - Treasurly Islands
  - Northern Solomons (Bougainville)
- Tonga
  - Geography of Tonga
- Trobiand Islands
- Vanuatu (New Hebrides)
  - Banks Islands
  - Maskelyne Islands
  - Mathew and Hunter Islands (Disputed between Vanuatu and France so it could be in here or not)
  - Shephard Islands
  - Torres Islands

==== Micronesia* ====
- Caroline Islands
- Faichuk Islands
  - Nomiwisofo Group
- Gilbert Islands (Kiribati)
- Hall Islands
- Line Islands
- Makur Islands
- Mariana Islands
- Marshall Islands
  - Ralik Chain
  - Ratak Chain
- Mortlock Islands (Nomoi Islands)
  - Upper Mortlock Islands
- Palau
  - Rock Islands
  - Southwest Islands
- Phoenix Islands
- Senyavin Islands

 *Subdivision of Oceania not country

==== Polynesia ====
- Adams Rocks
- Aldermen Islands
- Antipodes Islands
- Auckland Islands
- Bishop and Clerk Islets
- Bounty Islands
  - Main Group
  - Centre Group
  - East Group
- Campbell Islands
- Chatham Islands
  - Forty-Fours
  - The Sisters
- Cook Islands (Hervey Islands)
  - Northern Cook Islands
  - Southern Cook Islands
- Folly Islands
- French Polynesia
  - Acteon Group
  - Austral Islands
  - Gambier Islands
  - Marquesas
  - Rurutu
  - Society Islands
    - Îles du vent (Windward Islands)
    - Îles sous le vent (Leeward Islands)
  - Tuamotus
    - Disappointment Islands
    - Duke of Gloucester Islands
    - King George islands
    - Palliser Islands
    - Raeffsky Islands
    - Two Group Islands
  - Tubuai Group
- Hawaiian Islands (Sandwich Islands)
  - Northwestern Hawaiian Islands
    - French Frigate Shoals
    - Gardner Pinnacles
- Judge and Clerk Islets
- Mercury Islands
- New Zealand (main chain)
  - Bream Islands
  - Cavalli Islands
  - Chetwode Islands
  - Islands of the Hauraki Gulf
    - Hen and Chicken Islands (NZ)
    - Marotere Islands
    - Mayne Islands
    - Mercury Islands
    - Mokihinau Islands
    - Motukawao Islands
    - The Noises
  - Kermadec Islands
  - Poor Knights Islands
  - Simmonds Islands
  - Rurima Rocks
    - Moutoki Islands
    - Tokata Islands
  - Open Bay Islands
  - Rangitoto Islands
  - Solander Islands
  - Sugar Loaf Islands
  - Tata Islands
  - Three Kings Islands
  - Tītī / Muttonbird Islands
- Pitcairn Islands
- Samoan Islands (Navigators' Islands)
  - Aleipata Islands
    - American Samoa (Eastern Samoa)
      - Manu'a
    - Samoa (Western Samoa)
- Snares Islands
- Tonga Islands (Friendly Islands)
- Tokelau (Union Islands)
- Tuvalu (Ellice Islands)
- Wallis and Futuna Islands
  - Horne Islands

== Southern Ocean ==
Islands of the Southern Ocean:

Antarctica

- Aagaard Islands
- Afuera Islands
- Allison Islands
- Al'bov Rocks
- Auster Islands
- Austin Rocks
- Azimuth Islands
- Balleny Islands
- Biscoe Islands
  - Adolph Islands
  - Barcroft Islands
- Bugge Islands
- Burkett Islands
- Colbeck Archipelago
- Dellbridge Islands
- Dumoulin Islands
- Faure Islands
- Flat Islands
- Hydrographer Islands
- Joinville Island group
  - Danger Islands
- Law Islands
- Marshall Archipelago
- Mikkelsen Islands
- Nøkkelholmane Islands
- Palmer Archipelago
  - Melchior Islands
- Ross Archipelago
- Smith Islands
- South Orkney Islands
  - Flensing Islands
  - Gosling Islands
  - Governor Islands
  - Inaccessible Islands
  - Larsen Islands
  - Monk Islands
  - Murray Islands
  - Oliphant Islands
  - Robertson Islands
  - Whale Skerries
- South Shetland Islands
  - Aim Rocks
  - Aitcho Islands
    - Okol Rocks
  - Alepu Rocks
  - Atherton Islands
  - Avren Rocks
  - Dubar Islands
  - Meade Islands
  - Onogur Islands
  - Potmess Rocks
    - Asses Ears
  - Syrezol Rocks
  - Vardim Rocks
  - Voluyak Rocks
  - Zed Islands
- Wilhelm Archipelago
  - Anagram Islands
  - Argentine Islands
  - Betbeder Islands
  - Cruls Islands
  - Dannebrog Islands
  - Myriad Islands
  - Roca Islands
  - Vedel Islands
  - Wauwermans Islands
    - Vetrilo Rocks
    - Yato Rocks
  - Yalour Islands
- Windmill Islands
  - Swain Islands

Bouvet Island
Heard Island and McDonald Islands
Kerguelen Islands
South Georgia
South Sandwich Islands

== Lakes and rivers ==
- Angai Archipelago
- Archipelago of Lake Saint-Pierre
- Apostle Islands
- Beaver Archipelago
- Channel Islands
- Dome Islands
- Lake Erie Islands
- Hen and Chicken Islands (USA)
- Hochelaga Archipelago
- Mabanda Islets
- Sandy Islands (Lake Winnipeg)
- Sandy Islands (Lake Wollasten)
- Si Phan Don
- Slate Islands
- Solentiname Islands
- Solovetsky Islands
- Spider Islands
- Ssese Islands
- Thousand Islands
- The McKivens Archipelago
- Thirty Thousand Islands
- Ushkan Islands
- Vesi Archipelago

== By population ==
- Malay Archipelago 430,000,000 inhabitants
  - Indonesian Archipelago 280,000,000
    - Maluku Islands 3,131,860
    - Riau Islands 2,183,290
  - Philippine Islands 112,729,484
    - Sulu Archipelago 1,996,970
- Japanese archipelago (including Sakhalin) 124,000,000
  - Ryukyu Islands 1,550,161
  - Kuril Islands 21,500
- British Isles 71,900,000
- Antilles 43,563,500
  - Greater Antilles 38,400,500
  - Lesser Antilles 3,950,000
    - Leeward Antilles 770,000
    - Lucayan Archipelago 443,000
    - Virgin Islands 150,000
- Danish Isles 3,000,000
- Canary Islands 2,268,035
- Mascarene Islands 2,195,087
- Zanzibar Archipelago 2,000,000
- Hawaiian Islands 1,415,870
- Aegean Islands 1,400,000
  - Cyclades 119,549
- Balearic Islands 1,231,768
- Comoro Islands 1,153,195
- Bight of Bonny islands 660,000
  - Bioko 335,000
  - São Tomé and Príncipe 220,000
  - Annobón 5,000
- Maldives 601,269
- Maltese Islands 519,562
- Cape Verde 491,233
- Andaman Islands 343,125
- Madeira Islands 250,769
- Samoan Islands 249,839
- Azores 236,440
- Mariana Islands 228,600
- Society Islands 207,333
- Ionian Islands 207,855
- Channel Islands 171,916
- Caroline Islands 125,000
- Gilbert Islands 83,382
- Frisian Islands 81,341
- Lakshadweep 64,473
- Bermuda Islands 63,913
- Faroe Islands 56,210
- Hebrides 45,000
  - Outer Hebrides 26,000
  - Inner Hebrides 19,000
- Nicobar Islands 36,842
- Tuscan Archipelago 34,389
- Bissagos Islands 30,000
- Åland 29,884
- Caicos Islands 26,519
- Galapagos Islands 25,124
- Lofoten 24,500
- Shetland 23,210
- Orkney 22,100
- Grenadines 20,880
- San Juan Islands 17,582
- Southern Cook Islands 16,418
- Kerkennah Islands 15,501
- Aeolian Islands 15,419
- Tuamotus 15,346
- Arctic Archipelago 14,000
- Bocas del Toro Archipelago 13,000
- Magdalen Islands 12,781
- Islands of the Clyde 12,534
- Marquesas Islands 9,346
- Line Islands 8,813
- Aleutian Islands 8,162
- Austral Islands 6,965
- Pelagian Islands 6,556
- Haida Gwaii 4,761
- Torres Strait Islands 4,514
- Vestmannaeyjar 4,500
- Aegadian Islands 4,292
- Pontine Islands 4,066
- Falkland Islands 4,000
- Chagos Archipelago 3,000–5,000
- Fernando de Noronha 3,061
- Dahlak Archipelago 3,000
- Svalbard 2,667
- Bonin Islands 2,440
- Isles of Scilly 2,224
- Gambier Islands 1,533
- Aran Islands 1,225
- Northern Cook Islands 1,041
- Paracel Islands 1,000+
- Juan Fernandez Islands 900
- Chatham Islands 663
- Commander Islands 613
- Tremiti Islands 489
- Diomede Islands 135
- Phoenix Islands 24

== See also ==
- Archipelagic state
- Archipelago
- Archipelago Sea
- List of archipelagos by number of islands
- List of islands by name
- Lists of islands
