= List of archipelagos by number of islands =

List of archipelagos by number of islands:

Name	Number of islands	Country
Archipelago Sea (Turku Archipelago)	Over 50,000	Finland
Canadian Arctic Archipelago	36,563	Canada
Stockholm Archipelago	30,000	Sweden
Thirty Thousand Islands	Around 30,000	Canada
Malay Archipelago	Around 25,000	Brunei, Indonesia, Malaysia, Papua New Guinea, Philippines and Timor-Leste
Lake of the Woods Islands	14,632	Canada and United States
Indonesian Archipelago	13,558	Indonesia
Småland archipelago	12,740	Sweden
Öregrund archipelago	9,722	Sweden
Östergötland archipelago	8,888	Sweden
Philippine Archipelago	7,641	Philippines
Japanese archipelago	6,852	Japan
Kvarken Archipelago	5,600	Finland
Södermanland archipelago	5,371	Sweden
British Isles	4,400	Ireland and United Kingdom
Blekinge archipelago	2,875	Sweden
Alexander Archipelago	Over 2,000	United States
Thousand Islands	1,864	Canada and United States
Ha Long Bay	Over 1,600	Vietnam
Zhoushan archipelago	1,390	China
Great Barrier Reef	Over 900	Australia
Lucayan Archipelago	740	The Bahamas and Turks and Caicos Islands (United Kingdom)
Seto Inland Sea	Over 700	Japan
Dalmatia	1,244–1246	Croatia
Maldive Islands	1,190	Maldives
West Estonian archipelago	Almost 900	Estonia
Mergui Archipelago	Around 800	Myanmar
Falkland Islands	780	Falkland Islands (United Kingdom)
New Zealand archipelago	Over 600	New Zealand
Recherche Archipelago	Around 105	Australia

== See also ==
- Archipelagic state
- List of archipelagos
- List of countries by number of islands
