= Governor Islands =

Governor Islands may refer to:

- Governor Islands (South Orkney Islands) 60°30′S 45°56′W
- Governor Islands (Western Australia) 13°56′36″S 126°41′58″E
