= List of shipwrecks in October 1867 =

The list of shipwrecks in October 1867 includes ships sunk, foundered, grounded, or otherwise lost during October 1867.

== 1 October ==
List of shipwrecks: 1 October 1867
Ship	State	Description
Ariel	United Kingdom	The schooner was driven ashore on Holy Isle, in the Firth of Clyde. She was on a voyage from Ardrossan, Ayrshire to Dublin. She was refloated on 3 October and resumed her voyage.
Barbara	Netherlands	The ship ran aground on the Longsand, in the North Sea off the coast of Essex, United Kingdom and was abandoned by her crew. She was on a voyage from Groningen to Ipswich, Suffolk, United Kingdom.
Boa	United Kingdom	The schooner foundered in the North Sea off the mouth of the Elbe. Her crew survived. She was on a voyage from Hamburg to Montrose, Forfarshire.
Catharina	Prussia	The ship was driven ashore and wrecked on Düne, Heligoland. Her crew were rescued by three British fishing vessels. She was on a voyage from a Scottish port to Wyk auf Föhr.
Catherine	United Kingdom	The collier, a brig, foundered in the North Sea (54°31′N 5°50′E). All nine people on board were rescued by the steamship Primis (United Kingdom). Catherine was on a voyage from Rotterdam, South Holland, Netherlands to Newcastle upon Tyne, Northumberland.
Commot	United Kingdom	The schooner was driven ashore and wrecked at Sandsend, Yorkshire.
Elphinstone	United Kingdom	The ship ran aground at the mouth of the River Tyne. She was on a voyage from Quebec City, Canada to South Shields, County Durham. She was refloated the next day and towed in to South Shields in a waterlogged condition.
Euretta	United Kingdom	The ship ran aground on the Oel Platt, in the Weser and was wrecked. She was on a voyage from Rangoon, Burma to Bremen.
Fairlie	United Kingdom	The ship ran aground off Lysekil, Sweden. She was on a voyage from Newcastle upon Tyne Northumberland to Kronstadt, Russia.
Goethe	United Kingdom	The ship was driven ashore at Hong Kong.
Hiogo	United Kingdom	The steamship was wrecked on the Eddystone Rocks, Cornwall, 150 yards (140 m) from the Eddystone Lighthouse. All on board were rescued. She was on a voyage from London to Hiogo, Japan.
Lancaster	United Kingdom	The full-rigged ship was driven ashore at Hong Kong.
Lohikoski	(Russian Empire) Grand Duchy of Finland	The schooner, master G.A. Olin was driven ashore and wrecked near Ekholm, Estonia. She was on a voyage from Hull, Yorkshire to home port Vyborg with cargo of 1000 barrels of salt.
Nisiena, and an unnamed vessel	Netherlands; France	The ship, a galiot or koff, collided with a French brig and was abandoned 8 leagues (24 nautical miles (44 km)) off "Hartzhall". Her crew were rescued by the steamship Swanland (United Kingdom). Nisiena was on a voyage from Fredrikstad, Denmark to Termunterzijl, Groningen. The brig was also presumed to have foundered. Nisiena was sunbsequently taken in to Mollösund, Sweden in a derelict condition.
Rattler	United States	The ship was driven ashore at Hong Kong. She was later refloated.
Standard	United Kingdom	The barque caught fire in the Atlantic Ocean and was abandoned by her crew, who were rescued by the brig Christian Elizabeth (Norway). Standard was on a voyage from Quebec City to Leith, Lothian.
Sybil	United Kingdom	The schooner was run into by Mischief (United Kingdom) off Scarborough, Yorkshire and was abandoned by her crew, who were rescued by the Scarborough Lifeboat. Sybil was on a voyage from Great Yarmouth, Norfolk to Middlesbrough, Yorkshire.

== 2 October ==
List of shipwrecks: 2 October 1867
Ship	State	Description
Eliza Barss	United Kingdom	The barque caught fire at New York, United States and was scuttled. She was on a voyage from New York to Bermuda.
Helen and Eleanore	United Kingdom	The brigantine sprang a leak and was beached at Brighton, Sussex. She was on a voyage from Seaham, County Durham to Yarmouth, Isle of Wight. She was refloated the next day and towed in to Shoreham-by-Sea, Sussex.
Jemima	United Kingdom	The schooner was wrecked at Thisted, Denmark with the loss of a crew member. She was on a voyage from Kronstadt, Russia to London.
Jubilant	United Kingdom	The barque collided with the barque Mansanito (United Kingdom) and sank in the Atlantic Ocean 67 nautical miles (124 km) off Lisbon, Portugal. Her eleven crew were rescued by Mansanito. Jubilant was on a voyage from Taganrog, Russia to Cork.
Latona	United Kingdom	The schooner was driven ashore and wrecked at Peterhead, Aberdeenshire. She was on a voyage from the Firth of Forth to Findhorn, Aberdeenshire.
Pizarro	Brazil	The steamship departed from the Brazos River for New Orleans, Louisiana, United States. No further trace, presumed foundered with the loss of all hands.
Thomas Kennion	United Kingdom	The barque was wrecked on the Vogelsand, in the North Sea. Her crew survived. She was on a voyage from Hartlepool, County Durham to Hamburg.
Woodville	United Kingdom	The ship sprang a leak off the Calf of Man, Isle of Man. She was on a voyage from Whitehaven, Cumberland to Dublin She put in to Douglas, Isle of Man in a sinking condition.

== 3 October ==
List of shipwrecks: 3 October 1867
Ship	State	Description
Albert Louise	France	The sloop ran aground and was wrecked at Fécamp, Seine-Inférieure. Her crew were rescued. She was on a voyage from Dunkirk, Nord to Havre de Grâce, Seine-Inférieure.
Alice Harris	United Kingdom	The ship was driven ashore and severely damaged at Fishguard, Pembrokeshire.
Amazon	United Kingdom	The brigantine was driven ashore and wrecked at "Balmae" Dumfriesshire. Her crew were rescued. She was on a voyage from Silloth, Cumberland to Greenock, Renfrewshire.
Annie	United Kingdom	The ship collided with the schooner Yeoman's Glory ( (United Kingdom of Great Britain and Ireland) Guernsey) in the Cattewater and was beached. She was on a voyage from Plymouth to Bideford, Devon.
Ariel	United Kingdom	The schooner sprang a leak and foundered Ailsa Craig. Her six crew were rescued. She was on a voyage from Ardrossan, Ayrshire to Dublin.
Boa	United Kingdom	The schooner was driven ashore at the mouth of the Eider. Her crew were rescued.
Eclipse	United Kingdom	The barque capsized in a gale at Galveston, Texas, United States.
Endeavour	(United Kingdom of Great Britain and Ireland) New Zealand	The cutter was driven ashore on Rangitoto Reef in the Hauraki Gulf.
Higinie	Hamburg	The ship ran aground on the Tillen. She was on a voyage from Matanzas, Cuba to Hamburg.
Jessica	United Kingdom	The brig capsized and was driven ashore at Galveston, Texas, United States. She was later repaired and returned to service.
William Pitt	United Kingdom	The ship was wrecked on the Corton Sand, in the North Sea off the coast of Suffolk.

== 4 October ==
List of shipwrecks: 4 October 1867
Ship	State	Description
Adam y Eva	Spain	The ship was wrecked at Manila, Spanish East Indies. She was on a voyage from Manila to Cowes, Isle of Wight, United Kingdom.
Albine	Prussia	The ship was wrecked on "Lavenskaar". She was on a voyage from Saint Petersburg, Russia to Königsberg.
Enigheit	Hamburg	The ship foundered in the North Sea off the mouth of the Elbe. She was on a voyage from Hamburg to Sunderland, County Durham, United Kingdom.
Jarrow	United Kingdom	The steamship foundered in the Dogger Bank 65 nautical miles (120 km) west by south of Spurn Point, Yorkshire. Her eighteen crew were rescued by the smacks British Queen, Henrietta and Prima Donna (all United Kingdom). Jarrow was on a voyage from Middlesbrough, Yorkshire to Riga, Russia.
Lady Wynward	(United Kingdom of Great Britain and Ireland) New Zealand	The cutter was wrecked near East Cape during a severe gale, while en route from Napier to Auckland. All hands were saved.
Margarethe	Prussia	The ship was wrecked on Sylt. She was on a voyage from an English port to Leer.
Manukau	(United Kingdom of Great Britain and Ireland) New Zealand	The 300-ton schooner was wrecked with the loss of two lives close to the mouth of the Manawatu River while en route from Newcastle, New South Wales to Wellington.
Roma	United Kingdom	The ship was driven ashore at Berwick upon Tweed, Northumberland. She was on a voyage from Taganrog, Russia to Berwick upon Tweed. She was refloated on 6 November.
Stuart Wortley	United States	The ship was wrecked at Manila. She was on a voyage from Manila to New York.
Sunrise	United Kingdom	The brigantine ran aground on the Nore. She was refloated.
Venus	United Kingdom	The brig was wrecked on the Corton Sand, in the North Sea off the coast of Suffolk with the loss of three of her seven crew. Survivors were rescued by the Gorleston Lifeboat and a tug. She was on a voyage from Newcastle upon Tyne, Northumberland to London.

== 5 October ==
List of shipwrecks: 5 October 1867
Ship	State	Description
Adelaide	United Kingdom	The ship was driven ashore at Briton Ferry, Glamorgan.
Cuba	United Kingdom	The barque was wrecked at Ertholmene, Denmark. Her crew were rescued. She was on a voyage from South Shields, County Durham to Riga, Russia.
Dorothea	Rostock	The ship was wrecked on Hiiumaa, Russia. She was on a voyage from Rostock to Fredrikshavn, Denmark.
H. E.	United Kingdom	The ship struck a rock off The Lizard, Cornwall and was holed. She was on a voyage from Llanelly, Glamorgan to Plymouth, Devon. She was taken in to Plymouth and beached.
James Stanfield	United Kingdom	The ship ran aground at Maryport, Cumberland and was severely damaged.
Jernbararen	Sweden	The schooner was driven ashore at Torcross, Devon, United Kingdom. She was on a voyage from Par, Cornwall, to Runcorn, Cheshire, United Kingdom. She was refloated and towed in to Dartmouth, Devon in a sinking condition.
Maid of Kent	United Kingdom	The fishing smack was wrecked at Orfordness, Suffolk. Her crew were rescued.
Mary	United Kingdom	The barque was wrecked Popes Harbour, Nova Scotia, Canada.
Prince Je Roo	United Kingdom	The ship was driven ashore near Pictou, Nova Scotia.
Princess Royal	United Kingdom	The brigantine was abandoned in the North Sea off Veurne, West Flanders, Belgium. She was on a voyage from Par, Cornwall to Dordrecht, South Holland, Netherlands. Princess Royal was subsequently taken in to Ostend, West Flanders.

== 6 October ==
List of shipwrecks: 6 October 1867
Ship	State	Description
Adelaide	United Kingdom	The brig ran aground in the Paraná River.
Albion	United Kingdom	The brig ran aground in the Paraná River.
Danish Queen	United Kingdom	The steamship was destroyed by fire in the Baltic Sea All 21 crew survived. Twelve of the survivors were rescued by the barque Franklin (Norway. Danish Queen was on a voyage from Copenhagen, Denmark to Hull, Yorkshire.
E. Shun	United Kingdom	The schooner ran aground in the Paraná River.
Gem	United Kingdom	The ship ran aground on the Doom Bar. She was on a voyage from Cardiff, Glamorgan to Gibraltar.
Matilde Petersen	Norway	The barque foundered in the Atlantic Ocean. Her crew were rescued by 'Bella Figueireuse (Portugal).
Oriental	United Kingdom	The ship collided with a steamship off The Smalls with the loss of one of her crew and her captain reported missing. Survivors were rescued by the steamship Fitzwilliam (United Kingdom). Oriental was on a voyage from Quebec City, Canada to Conway, Caernarfonshire. She was subsequently towed in to Lamorna, Cornwall in a capsized condition.
Quickstep	United Kingdom	The barque ran aground in the Paraná river.
St. Bede	United Kingdom	The steamship ran aground on the Leigh Middle Sand, in the Thames Estuary. She was later refloated.
St. George	United Kingdom	The smack was driven ashore at Portaferry, County Down.
Victoria	United Kingdom	The schooner was driven ashore and wrecked at Portaferry. She was on a voyage from Whitehaven, Cumberland to Killough, County Down.
Unnamed	Prussia	The barque was driven ashore at Dungeness, Kent, United Kingdom.

== 7 October ==
List of shipwrecks: 7 October 1867
Ship	State	Description
Active	United Kingdom	The ship foundered off Trevose Head, Cornwall. She was on a voyage from Milford Haven, Pembrokeshire to Hayle, Cornwall.
Adolphe	France	The barque collided with Abraham Lincoln (Sweden) in the Bristol Channel east north east of Lundy Island, Devon, United Kingdom. Four on her ten crew reached shore in a boat. The rest got on board Abraham Lincoln. Adolphe was on a voyage from Saint-Malo, Ille-et-Vilaine to Cardiff, Glamorgan, United Kingdom. She was later boarded and taken in to Cardiff.
B. F. Shaw	United Kingdom	The barque was wrecked on the Orange Keys. She was on a voyage from Portland, Maine, United States to Havana, Cuba.
Cherry	United Kingdom	The schooner was driven ashore.
Lady Franklin	United Kingdom	The brig collided with the steamship Dantsig (United Kingdom) and sank off the Newarp Lightship ( Trinity House). Her crew were rescued by Dantsig. Lady Franklin was on a voyage from London to Aberdeen.
Undine	France	The brig was lost at Barbados.

== 8 October ==
List of shipwrecks: 8 October 1867
Ship	State	Description
Aglai	Italy	The brig was wrecked at the mouth of the Arno with the loss of three of her crew.
Blondine	United Kingdom	The ship was wrecked at Thisted, Denmark with the loss of all hands. She was on a voyage from Reval, Russia to London.
British Empire	United Kingdom	The full-rigged ship was driven ashore at Saint Thomas, Virgin Islands. She was refloated the next day.
Cuban	Spain	The steamship ran aground on the Rochelois Reef. She was on a voyage from Havana, Cuba to Port-au-Prince, Haiti. She was refloated and resumed her voyage.
Forsyth	United Kingdom	The ship was driven ashore. Shew as on a voyage from Constantinople, Ottoman Empire to London.
Pepita	Spain	The ship was wrecked at Ringkøbing, Denmark. She was on a voyage from Bilbao to a Baltic port.
Sampson	United Kingdom	The sloop was run ashore in Loch Staffin. She subsequently became a wreck.
Sea	United Kingdom	The barque was driven ashore at Beadnell, Northumberland. She was on a voyage from Bo'ness, Lothian to Kronstadt, Russia. She was refloated on 12 October and take in to Berwick upon Tweed, Northumberland.

== 9 October ==
List of shipwrecks: 9 October 1867
Ship	State	Description
Antelope	United Kingdom	The ship was wrecked at "Curlew Harbour", Labrador, Newfoundland Colony with the loss of eighteen lives.
Arcadia	United Kingdom	The ship foundered in the Baltic Sea off Söderhamn, Sweden. She was on a voyage from Söderhamn to Bridgwater, Somerset.
Arrow	United Kingdom	The schooner was driven ashore and wrecked at Harbour Grace, Newfoundland Colony. She was on a voyage from Harbour Grace to Queenstown, County Cork.
Atlas	United Kingdom	The whaler was lost off the coast of Labrador.
B. S. Kimball	United States	The full-rigged ship was wrecked on the Elbow Key Reef. She was on a voyage from New York to New Orleans, Louisiana.
Charles	United Kingdom	The whaler was lost off the coast of Labrador.
Charles Elizabeth	United Kingdom	The ship was wrecked at Indian Tickle, Labrador, Newfoundland Colony.
Claas Tholen	Flag unknown	The ship sprang a leak and foundered. Seven crew were rescued by Anna (Netherlands). Claas Tholen was on a voyage from Saint Petersburg, Russia to Hartlepool, County Durham, United Kingdom.
Dagmar	United Kingdom	The brigantine ran aground on the Redcar Reef. She was on a voyage from Kronstadt, Russia to Great Yarmouth, Norfolk. she was refloated and completed her voyage in a leaky condition.
Dash	United Kingdom	The ship was wrecked at Indian Tickle.
Der Wanderer	Prussia	The barque was wrecked on the Goodwin Sands, Kent, United Kingdom. She was on a voyage from Sundsvall, Norway to Liverpool, Lancashire, United Kingdom.
Dove	United Kingdom	The ship was wrecked on the coast of Labrador.
Elizabeth	United Kingdom	The whaler was lost off the coast of Labrador.
E. M. Dodd	United Kingdom	The ship was wrecked on the coast of Labrador.
Estella	United Kingdom	The whaler was lost off the coast of Labrador.
Four Brothers	United Kingdom	The whaler was lost off the coast of Labrador.
Isabella	United Kingdom	The whaler was lost off the coast of Labrador.
Margaret Grant	United Kingdom	The whaler was lost off the coast of Labrador.
Mary	United Kingdom	The ship was wrecked on the coat of Labrador.
Mary Bell	United Kingdom	The ship was wrecked on the coast of Labrador.
Native Friend	United Kingdom	The ship was wrecked on the coast of Labrador.
Orion	United Kingdom	The ship was wrecked on the coast of Labrador.
Rapid	United Kingdom	The whaler was lost off the coast of Labrador.
Ready Rhino	United Kingdom	The brig ran aground on the Water Rock, off the coast of County Down. She was on a voyage from Dublin to Ardrossan, Ayrshire. Ready Rhino was refloated on 15 October and towed in to Belfast, County Antrim.
Rival	United Kingdom	The whaler was lost off the coast of Labrador.
Roe	United Kingdom	The whaler was lost off the coast of Labrador.
Sea Slipper	United Kingdom	The ship was wrecked on the coast of Labrador.
Syke	United Kingdom	The ship was wrecked on the coast of Labrador.
Terra Nova	United Kingdom	The ship was wrecked at Indian Tickle.

== 10 October ==
List of shipwrecks: 10 October 1867
Ship	State	Description
Brilliant Star	United Kingdom	The ship was wrecked on the coast of Labrador.
Chanticleer	United Kingdom	The ship was wrecked on the coast of Labrador.
Fire Fly	United Kingdom	The brigantine was driven ashore on Lundy Island, Devon. She had been refloated by 16 October and intended to sail for Ilfracombe, Devon.
Harriet	United Kingdom	The ship was driven ashore and wrecked at Escuminac, New Brunswick, Canada.
Jane	United Kingdom	The ship was wrecked on the coast of Labrador.
Rusina	United Kingdom	The ship was wrecked on the coast of Labrador.
Star	United Kingdom	The ship was wrecked on the coast of Labrador.
Tangier	United Kingdom	The ship was wrecked on the coast of Labrador.
Trinity	United Kingdom	The ship was wrecked on the coast of Labrador.
Vlinder	Flag unknown	The ship foundered in the Baltic Sea off "Eckholm". Her crew were rescued. she was on a voyage from Saint Petersburg, Russia to London, United Kingdom.
Wave	United Kingdom	The ship was wrecked on the coast of Labrador.

== 11 October ==
List of shipwrecks: 11 October 1867
Ship	State	Description
Alice Byrne	United Kingdom	The whaler was lost off the coast of Labrador, Newfoundland Colony.
Caroline	United Kingdom	The ship struck the Quies and foundered. Her crew were rescued.
Eucinda	United Kingdom	The whaler was lost off the coast of Labrador.
Nora	Canada	The barque was driven ashore on Sanday, Orkney Islands. She was on a voyage from Gothenburg, Sweden to Boston, Massachusetts, United States. She was refloated and taken in to Kirkwall, Orkney Islands.
Oriel	United Kingdom	The whaler was lost off the coast of Labrador.
Venus	United Kingdom	The ship was wrecked at Perros, Côtes-du-Nord, Finistère, France. She was on a voyage from Africa to Liverpool, Lancashire.

== 12 October ==
List of shipwrecks: 12 October 1867
Ship	State	Description
Cambrian Packet	United Kingdom	The smack collided with the tug Rover and the full-rigged ship Unicorn (bot United Kingdom) and sank at Liverpool, Lancashire. Cambrian Packet was on a voyage from Newry, County Antrim to Runcorn, Cheshire.
Carl	Flag unknown	The ship was driven ashore and wrecked on the coast of Jutland. She was on a voyage from Saint Petersburg, Russia to a British port.
Emily	United Kingdom	The schooner was driven ashore on Jerseyman Island, Nova Scotia, Canada. She was on a voyage from Pictou, Nova Scotia to Greenock, Renfrewshire.
Genkai	China	The ship was wrecked at Melange Point.
Menapia	United States	The ship was driven ashore on Cumberland Island, Georgia. She was on a voyage from Savannah, Georgia to the Satilla River. Menapia subsequently broke in two and was rescued.

== 13 October ==
List of shipwrecks: 13 October 1867
Ship	State	Description
Ardenlee	United Kingdom	The ship was driven ashore and wrecked at Fox River, Nova Scotia, Canada. Her crew were rescued. She was on a voyage from London to Quebec City, Canada.
Heken	United Kingdom	The schooner ran aground on the Goodwin Sands.
Ironmaster, and Pacific	United Kingdom	The steamship Ironmaster collided with the steamship Pacific and sank at Rotterdam, South Holland, Netherlands. She was on a voyage from Middlesbrough, Yorkshire to Rotterdam. Ironmaster was refloated on 15 June 1868 and placed under repair. Pacific was on a voyage from Harwich, Essex to Rotterdam. She was beached.
John and William	United Kingdom	The sloop was run down and sunk in the North Sea by a steamship. Her crew were rescued. She was on a voyage from a Scottish port to Emden, Prussia.
Josephine	Norway	The ship was driven ashore at "Domstern", Sweden. She was on a voyage from Kronstadt, Russia to Liverpool, Lancashire, United Kingdom.
Nouvelle Penelope Vigoreux	France	The ship ran aground on Gun Cay, Bahamas. She was on a voyage from Havana, Cuba to New York, United States. She was refloated and put in to Nassau, Bahamas.
Ontario	United Kingdom	The ship was wrecked at Loop Head, County Clare. She was on a voyage from Limerick to the Bristol Channel.

== 14 October ==
List of shipwrecks: 14 October 1867
Ship	State	Description
De Van Trientje	Prussia	The galiot was abandoned in the Baltic Sea 30 nautical miles (56 km) off Fårö, Sweden. Her crew were rescued by Maria (United Kingdom).
Duo Fratres	Norway	The brig was driven ashore and wrecked near the mouth of the River Eden. All eleven people on board survived. She was on a voyage from Bergen to Leith, Lothian, United Kingdom. She was refloated on 12 November and towed in to Dundee, Forfarshire, United Kingdom.
Mary Eleanor	United Kingdom	The ship sprang a leak and was beached at Harwich, Essex.
Oceola	United Kingdom	The ship was driven ashore and severely damaged at Flamborough Head, Yorkshire. She was on a voyage from London to South Shields, County Durham. She was refloated.
Snowdrop	United Kingdom	The schooner was driven ashore and wrecked at Seaham, County Durham. She was on a voyage from Whitstable, Kent to Seaham.
Waverley	United Kingdom	The barque ran aground off Gotland, Sweden. She was on a voyage from Kronstadt, Russia to Amsterdam, North Holland, Netherlands. She was refloated and put in to Copenhagen, Denmark for repairs.

== 15 October ==
List of shipwrecks: 15 October 1867
Ship	State	Description
Berzilius	Sweden	The ship collided with a Rostock barque and sank. She was on a voyage from Gävle to London, United Kingdom.
Cherub	United Kingdom	The schooner was driven ashore at Thisted, Denmark. She was on a voyage from Kronstadt, Russia to London. She was refloated and taken in to a Norwegian port.
Derrynane	United Kingdom	The ship capsized at Limerick and was wrecked.
Earl of Ditzum	United Kingdom	The ship was wrecked near Ringkøbing, Denmark. She was on a voyage from Newcastle upon Tyne, Northumberland to Copenhagen, Denmark.
Johns	United Kingdom	The brig capsized and sank at South Shields, County Durham.
Lady Alice Hill	United Kingdom	The ship ran aground at Belfast, County Antrim.
Ontario	United Kingdom	The schooner was wrecked in "Kilbaha Bay". She was on a voyage from Liverpool, Lancashire to the Kingroad.
Ruth	United Kingdom	The brig was driven ashore at Braunton, Devon. Her crew were rescued by the Braunton Lifeboat. She was on a voyage from Sombrero, Anguilla to Gloucester. She was refloated on 24 October and taken in to Appledore, Devon.

== 16 October ==
List of shipwrecks: 16 October 1867
Ship	State	Description
Benin	United Kingdom	The ship ran aground on the Durante Reef, off the coast of Côtes-du-Nord, France and capsized. She was on a voyage from Africa to Liverpool, Lancashire.
Carl	United Kingdom	The ship was wrecked. She was on a voyage from Newcastle upon Tyne, Northumberland to Copenhagen, Denmark.
Louisa	Netherlands	The steamship was driven ashore at Boulmer, Northumberland. She was on a voyage from Rotterdam, South Holland, Netherlands to Glasgow, Renfrewshire, United Kingdom. She had been refloated by 2 November and taken in to Boulmer.
Spes	Prussia	The ship was driven ashore. She was on a voyage from Königsberg to Stavanger, Norway.
Wellington	United Kingdom	The schooner sank near the Coneybeg Lightship ( Trinity House), in the Irish Sea. Her four crew were rescued. She was on a voyage from Llanelly, Glamorgan to Waterford.
RMS Wolf	United Kingdom	The paddle steamer was run into by the paddle steamer Prince Arthur (United Kingdom) and sank at Carrickfergus, County Antrim. All on board were rescued by Price Arthur and steamship Countess of Eglinton (United Kingdom). Wolf was on a voyage from Belfast, County Antrim to Glasgow. She was salvaged in 1868, rebuilt and returned to service.

== 17 October ==
List of shipwrecks: 17 October 1867
Ship	State	Description
Harriet	United Kingdom	The barque was wrecked at "Escurunae". She was on a voyage from Waterford to Quebec City, Canada.
Jeune Mathilde	France	The ship was driven ashore at "Parpier", Cornwall, United Kingdom of Great Britain and Ireland. She was on a voyage from Caen, Calvados to Penarth, Glamorgan, United Kingdom. She was refloated and taken in to Fowey, Cornwall in a leaky condition.

== 18 October ==
List of shipwrecks: 18 October 1867
Ship	State	Description
Abba	Denmark	The ship was driven ashore at Höganäs, Sweden. She was on a voyage from Kronstadt, Russia to London, United Kingdom. She was refloated and towed in to Helsingør.
Britannia	United Kingdom	The ship sank off Stevens, Denmark. Her crew were rescued. She was on a voyage from Newport, Monmouthshire to Riga, Russia.

== 19 October ==
List of shipwrecks: 19 October 1867
Ship	State	Description
Favourite	United Kingdom	The whaler was wrecked on the coast of Greenland. Her crew survived.
Firefly	United Kingdom	The ship was driven ashore near Cape Lagos.
Invermark	United Kingdom	The schooner was driven ashore at "Juleback Neath" Denmark. She was on a voyage from Peterhead, Aberdeenshire to Königsberg, Prussia. She was refloated and towed in to Helsingør, Denmark by the steamship Øresund (Denmark).
Jessy	United Kingdom	The brigantine caught fire and was scuttled at Seaham, County Durham. She was on a voyage from Sunderland, County Durham to the Nieuw Diep.
Phoenix	Canada	The ship, which had caught fire on 13 October, was abandoned in the Indian Ocean. Her crew were rescued.
Samson	United Kingdom	The steamship was driven ashore in the Dardanelles. She was on a voyage from Brăila, Ottoman Empire to Marseille, Bouches-du-Rhône, France. She was refloated on 22 October and resumed her voyage.

== 20 October ==
List of shipwrecks: 20 October 1867
Ship	State	Description
Amsterdam	United Kingdom	The steamship was driven ashore and wrecked at Montauk Point, New York, United States with the loss of all hands.
Lubinka	Russia	The ship struck a sunken rock 9 nautical miles (17 km) north north west of the Butt of Lewis, Outer Hebrides, United Kingdom. She was on a voyage from Riga to Liverpool, Lancashire, United Kingdom. She put in to Stornoway, Isle of Lewis in a waterlogged condition.

== 21 October ==
List of shipwrecks: 21 October 1867
Ship	State	Description
Bosphorus	United Kingdom	The steamship was wrecked on Zitzikamma Point, Cape Colony with the loss of 47 of her 85 crew. She was on a voyage from Simon's Bay to the Red Sea with supplies for the British Expedition to Abyssinia.
James Campbell	United Kingdom	The barque was wrecked at Caernarfon. Her crew were rescued by the Llanddwyn Lifeboat John Gray Bell ( Royal National Lifeboat Institution). James Campbell was on a voyage from Demerara, British Guiana to Liverpool, Lancashire. She was refloated on 28 October and towed in to Caernarfon.
Kent	United Kingdom	The schooner was wrecked 3 nautical miles (5.6 km) from Aberdaron, Caernarfonshire. Her crew were rescued. She was on a voyage from Gloucester to "Portmillan".
Matilda	(United Kingdom of Great Britain and Ireland) New Zealand	The schooner was wrecked at Okarito. She was leaving harbour when the breeze failed and she became unmanageable, drifting onto rocks.
Oldenburgermeister	Grand Duchy of Oldenburg }	The ship was driven ashore on Skagen, Denmark. She was refloated and resumed her voyage.
Princess Alexandra	United Kingdom	The ship was driven ashore on "Lansholm". She was on a voyage from Kronstadt, Russia to London. She was refloated.

== 22 October ==
List of shipwrecks: 22 October 1867
Ship	State	Description
Elizabeth	United Kingdom	The ship struck a sunken wreck off the coast of Suffolk. She was on a voyage from Sunderland, County Durham to London. She put in to Lowestoft, Suffolk in a leaky condition.
Fire Fly	United Kingdom	The ship was driven ashore and wrecked 5 nautical miles (9.3 km) north of Cape St. Vincent, Portugal with the loss of a crew member.
Happy-go-Lucky	United Kingdom	The schooner was driven ashore in Manxman's Lake, Kirkcudbrightshire. She was on a voyage from Maryport, Cumberland to Belfast, County Antrim.
Laura Williamson, and May	United Kingdom	The brig May collided with the schooner Laura Williamson and was abandoned in the North Sea off Whitby, Yorkshire. Her crew were rescued by the tug Gleaner (United Kingdom) just before she sank. Gleaner towed Laura Williamson in to Hartlepool, County Durham.
Peppino	Italy	The brig was driven ashore on the Mull of Galloway, Argyllshire, United Kingdom. She was on a voyage from Belfast, County Antrim to Cardiff, Glamorgan, United Kingdom. She was refloated and towed back to Belfast.
Royal Adelaide	United Kingdom	The ship was sighted in the Atlantic Ocean whilst on a voyage from Bombay, India to Liverpool, Lancashire. No further trace, presumed foundered with the loss of all hands.
Tadousac	United Kingdom	The ship was driven ashore on Anticosti Island, Nova Scotia, Canada. Her crew were rescued. She was on a voyage from Liverpool to Quebec City, Canada.

== 23 October ==
List of shipwrecks: 23 October 1867
Ship	State	Description
Cora	United Kingdom	The barque was abandoned in the Atlantic Ocean with the loss of a crew member. Her crew were rescued by the brigantine Ariel (United Kingdom). Cora was on a voyage from Greenock, Renfrewshire to Newfoundland.
Elia Adele	United Kingdom	The barque was wrecked at Havana, Cuba.
Hudson	United States	The ship was beached at Greenwich, Kent, United Kingdom. She was on a voyage from London, United Kingdom to New York. Hudson had been refloated by 28 October and towed in to Gravesend, Kent.
Venus	Prussia	The ship sank off the "Base Rock". Her crew were rescued. She was on a voyage from Leith, Lothian, United Kingdom to Rendsborg.

== 24 October ==
List of shipwrecks: 24 October 1867
Ship	State	Description
Æolus	(United Kingdom of Great Britain and Ireland) New South Wales	The ketch was wrecked at Hole in the Wall, Jervis Bay, New South Wales, Australia, without loss off life.
Breese	United Kingdom	The smack was abandoned in the North Sea. Her crew were rescued. She was subsequently towed in to Great Yarmouth, Norfolk.
Kezia Page	United Kingdom	The brigantine ran aground off the coast of Suffolk. She was on a voyage from Folkestone, Kent to Blyth, Northumberland. She was refloated and assisted in to Lowestoft, Suffolk.

== 25 October ==
List of shipwrecks: 25 October 1867
Ship	State	Description
Ceres	United Kingdom	The ship departed from Falmouth, Cornwall for Glasgow, Renfrewshire. No further trace, presumed foundered with the loss of all hands.
Eureka	United Kingdom	The schooner was run into by John Belham (United Kingdom). She was on a voyage from London to Buenos Aires, Argentina. Eureka was abandoned the next day. Her eight crew were rescued by Huntley Castle (United Kingdom).
Sarah	United Kingdom	The brig was driven ashore at "Gillelee", Seine-Inférieure, France. She was refloated the next day.

== 26 October ==
List of shipwrecks: 26 October 1867
Ship	State	Description
Adelhide Marini	Flag unknown	The ship was driven ashore and sank at Sulina, Ottoman Empire. She was on a voyage from Sulina to an English port.
Earl of Chester	United Kingdom	The ship was wrecked on the Cerrig y Defaid Rock, near Rhosneigr, Anglesey with the loss of all nineteen people on board. She was on a voyage from Liverpool, Lancashire to Madras, India.
Favourite	United Kingdom	The schooner struck the Cannon Rock and foundered. Her crew were rescued. She was on a voyage from Arbroath, Forfarshire to Greenock, Renfrewshire.
Petrel	United Kingdom	The schooner was driven ashore near Ardglass, County Down. Her crew were rescued.
Phœnix	United Kingdom	The schooner was driven ashore and wrecked at Dunbar, Lothian. Her crew were rescued.
Thomas Parker	United Kingdom	Thomas Parker The schooner was wrecked on St Mary's Isle, Douglas, Isle of Man. Her five crew were rescued.
Triumph	United Kingdom	The ship was driven ashore and wrecked at Tremadog, Anglesey. Her twelve crew were rescued. She was on a voyage from Liverpool to Maranhão, Brazil.

== 27 October ==
List of shipwrecks: 27 October 1867
Ship	State	Description
Argus	United Kingdom	The brig was driven ashore on Amager, Denmark. She was on a voyage from Gävle, Sweden to London. She had been refloated by 30 October and was subsequently towed in to Copenhagen, Denmark in a waterlogged condition to be repaired.
Ariel	United Kingdom	The ship was driven ashore and wrecked at Barn Scurr, near Drigg, Cumberland. Her crew were rescued. She was on a voyage from Dublin to Maryport, Cumberland.
Columbo	Italy	The barque was driven ashore on Lundy Island, Devon, United Kingdom. She was on a voyage from Cardiff, Glamorgan, United Kingdom to Galle, Ceylon. Columbo was destroyed by fire on 29 October.
Maria, or Mary Ann	United Kingdom	The brigantine was driven ashore in the River Duddon and was abandoned by her five crew, who were presumed to have drowned. She subsequently became a wreck.
Mentor	United Kingdom	The brig was abandoned in the North Sea off Terschelling, Friesland, Netherlands. Her crew were rescued. She was on a voyage from Sunderland, County Durham to Harlingen, Friesland.
Old Harry	United Kingdom	The schooner was driven ashore at Bootle, Cumberland. She was on a voyage from Dublin to Workington, Cumberland.
Queen	United Kingdom	The sloop sprang a leak and foundered in the North Sea 14 nautical miles (26 km) off Cromer, Norfolk. Her crew were rescued by the steamship Brigadier (United Kingdom). Queen was on a voyage from Lowestoft, Suffolk to Goole, Yorkshire.
HMS Royal George	Royal Navy	The Caledonia-class ship of the line was driven ashore at Kingstown, County Dublin. She was refloated with assistance from Ulster (United Kingdom.

== 28 October ==
List of shipwrecks: 28 October 1867
Ship	State	Description
Gazelle	United Kingdom	The ship was wrecked on the Kentish Knock. Her crew were rescued by Mary (United Kingdom). Gazelle was on a voyage from Rotterdam, South Holland, Netherlands to Gloucester.
Good Hope	United Kingdom	The ship sank in Ramsey Sound.
Isabella	Uruguay	The steamboat was lost near Milford Haven, Pembrokeshire, United Kingdom. She was on a voyage from Liverpool, Lancashire, United Kingdom to Montevideo. She was refloated and taken in to Milford Haven but was declared a constructive total loss.
News	United Kingdom	The fishing lugger was driven ashore and wrecked at Lowestoft, Suffolk. Her crew were rescued.
Primo Gardimo	Italy	The barque was driven ashore at St. Mawes, Cornwall, United Kingdom.
Queen	United Kingdom	The ship spang a leak and foundered in the North Sea 14 nautical miles (26 km) off Cromer, Norfolk. Her crew were rescued by Brigadier (United Kingdom). Queen was on a voyage from Lowestoft to Goole, Yorkshire.
Sir Colin Campbell	United Kingdom	The brig struck a sunken rock Île-à-Vache, Haiti. She was on a voyage from the Cuyuni River to a British port. She put in to Demerara, British Guiana.
Six Brothers	United Kingdom	The ship was wrecked near Porthdinllaen, Caernarfonshire. She was on a voyage from Par, Cornwall to Runcorn, Cheshire.
Staverton	United Kingdom	The ship was sighted off the Cape Verde Islands whilst on a voyage from Birkenhead, Cheshire to Bombay, India. No further trace, presumed foundered with the loss of all hands.
Unity	United Kingdom	The schooner was driven ashore at Ballyhack, County Wexford. She was refloated on 30 October.
Venus	United Kingdom	The schooner was driven ashore at Sandgate, Kent. She was refloated and towed in to Dover, Kent.
Wide Awake	United Kingdom	The smack was wrecked near Porteynon Point, Glamorgan. Her crew were rescued. She was on a voyage from Tenby, Pembrokeshire to Dartmouth, Devon.

== 29 October ==
List of shipwrecks: 29 October 1867
Ship	State	Description
Aberdeen	United States	San Narciso hurricane: The barque was driven ashore at Saint Thomas, Danish West Indies with the loss of three lives.
Agnes Lamb	United Kingdom	San Narciso hurricane: The barque was severely damaged at Saint Thomas. She was condemned.
Albagracia	Spain	San Narciso hurricane: The ship sank at Saint Thomas.
Albiba	Flag unknown	San Narciso hurricane: The ship sank at Saint Thomas.
Alexandra or Alexander	United Kingdom	San Narciso Hurricane: The schooner was driven ashore and wrecked at Saint Thomas, Danish West Indies.
Alfonso	Spain	San Narciso hurricane: The schooner sank at Saint Thomas.
Altagracia or Alta Garcia	Spain	San Narciso hurricane: The schooner sank at Saint Thomas with the loss of one life.
Amalia	Netherlands	San Narciso hurricane: The ship sank in Long Bay on the east side of the Harbor of Saint Thomas.
Antje	Netherlands	San Narciso hurricane: The brigantine was severely damaged at Saint Thomas.
Bellemontrose	United Kingdom	The schooner was wrecked near Büsum, Prussia with the loss of all but one of her crew.
Bernice	France	San Narciso hurricane: The barque was driven ashore and wrecked at Saint Thomas.
Bertha	Prussia	San Narciso hurricane: The brig capsized and sank at Saint Thomas, Danish West Indies, a total loss, with the loss of all but two of her crew. She was condemned.
British Empire	United Kingdom	San Narciso hurricane: The full-rigged ship sank at Saint Thomas, Danish West Indies when she struck the gridiron, sinking on top of Columbian (United Kingdom) and Veloce (France). She was condemned, or reported destroyed, but was refloated in August 1868.
Brune	France	San Narciso hurricane: The barque was driven ashore and wrecked at Saint Thomas, Danish West Indies.
Camagnel or Camaguey	United Kingdom	San Narciso hurricane: The steamship was driven ashore and wrecked by the gas works in the Harbor of Saint Thomas with the loss of 11 or 17 of her crew.
Caravelle	France	San Narciso hurricane: The steamship was severely damaged at Saint Thomas.
Charles Sprague	United States	San Narciso hurricane: The full-rigged ship was driven ashore and wrecked at Saint Thomas, Danish West Indies, a total loss Two of her crew were rescued.
Clifford	Nova Scotia	San Narciso hurricane: The Brig was driven ashore and wrecked at Baní, Dominican Republic.
Clinton	United States	San Narciso hurricane: The schooner capsized and sank at Saint Thomas, Danish West Indies.
Columbian	United Kingdom	San Narciso hurricane: The steamship sank at Saint Thomas, Danish West Indies. She was driven into the gridiron, on which her crew escaped just before she sank in 35 feet of water. Just after she sank, British Empire (United Kingdom) struck the same place and sank on top of her, both reported destroyed at the time. She was refloated in August 1868.
Concepcion	Venezuela	San Narciso hurricane: The schooner sank at Saint Thomas, Danish West Indies.
RMS Conway	United Kingdom	San Narciso hurricane: The steamship was driven ashore and severely damaged near Rhodestown, Tortola, Danish West Indies. She was later refloated.
Cornubia	United Kingdom	The ship collided with a brig off Lundy Island, Devon and was holed at the bow. She was on a voyage from Newport, Monmouthshire to Ancona, Papal States. She was consequently beached near Swansea, Glamorgan in a waterlogged condition.
Courrier de St. Pierre	France	The ship sprang a leak and was beached at Camaret-sur-Mer, Finistère.
RMS Derwent	United Kingdom	San Narciso hurricane: The steamship was driven ashore by the gas works and wrecked on Saint Thomas, Danish West Indies. Her crew survived.
Dos Hermanos	Denmark	San Narciso hurricane: The schooner sank at Saint Thomas.
Dredger	Denmark	San Narciso hurricane: The steamship was driven ashore at Saint Thomas.
Edward or Eduard	Prussia	San Narciso hurricane: The brig was driven ashore on rocks at Saint Thomas.
Elizabeth	United Kingdom	San Narciso hurricane: The schooner sank, or was driven ashore, at Saint Thomas, Danish West Indies. She was condemned.
Emma	France	San Narciso hurricane: The barque sank at Saint Thomas.
Emma Eliza	New Zealand	The schooner broke up when she went ashore while trying to enter Hokitika harbour during a gale.
Emelia Lamb	United Kingdom	San Narciso hurricane: The ship was driven ashore and wrecked on Desecho Island, Puerto Rico with the loss of seven of her crew. She was on a voyage from Saint Domingo to London.
Formalidad	Spain	San Narciso hurricane: The schooner sank at Saint Thomas.
Formby	United Kingdom	The brig was run into by the brig Ebenezer (United Kingdom) and caught fire at Aldeburgh, Suffolk. Her crew were rescued by Enenezer. Formby burnt out and sank. She was on a voyage from Hartlepool, County Durham to London.
Gazelle	France	San Narciso hurricane: The barque was driven ashore and damaged at Saint Thomas. She was condemned.
General de Lourmel	France	San Narciso hurricane: The barque was driven ashore and severely damaged at Saint Thomas.
Glinlin	United States	San Narciso hurricane: The schooner capsized at Saint Thomas with the loss of one life. She was condemned.
Grace	United Kingdom	The barque ran aground on the Cockle Sand, in the North Sea off the coast of Norfolk. She was refloated.
Helvise or Helios	Grand Duchy of Oldenburg	San Narciso hurricane: The brig was driven ashore on a mud bank by the gas works at Saint Thomas.
Her Majesty	United Kingdom	San Narciso hurricane: The brig was driven ashore and wrecked at Saint Thomas, Danish West Indies.
Hope	United Kingdom	San Narciso hurricane: The brig was driven ashore and wrecked at Saint Thomas. She was condemned.
Howard	United Kingdom	San Narciso hurricane: The barque was driven ashore and severely damaged in a hurricane at Saint Thomas.
Ida Abbott	United Kingdom	San Narciso hurricane: The brig was driven ashore by the Ice House and wrecked at Saint Thomas.
Itchen or RMS Itchen	United Kingdom or Denmark	San Narciso hurricane: The tug sank at the R. M. S. wharf at Saint Thomas.
Jacmel	France	San Narciso hurricane: The brig was severely damaged at Saint Thomas.
Jeune Paul	France	The ship sprang a leak and was beached at Camaret-sur-Mer. She was on a voyage from Cardiff, Glamorgan to Bordeaux, Gironde.
Johanne	Bremen	San Narciso hurricane: The brig capsized and sank in the western part of the Hatbor at Saint Thomas. She was condemned.
John Browne	United Kingdom	The brig ran aground on the Barnard Sand, in the North Sea off the coast of Suffolk. She was on a voyage from Sunderland, County Durham to Devonport, Devon. She was refloated and resumed her voyage, but put in to Dover, Kent in a leaky condition.
Joren Inachila	Venezuela	San Narciso hurricane: The schooner sank at Saint Thomas.
Joven Panchita	Venezuela	San Narciso hurricane: The Schooner was lost at Saint Thomas, Danish West Indies.
Juliet	Netherlands	San Narciso hurricane: The schooner was driven ashore and damaged at Saint Thomas, Danish West Indies by Her Majesty (United Kingdom).
Leda	United Kingdom	The brigantine was wrecked on the Corton Sand, in the North Sea off the coast of Suffolk. Her crew were rescued. She was on a voyage from Swansea to Great Yarmouth, Norfolk.
Liliputian	Denmark	San Narciso hurricane: The tug sank at Saint Thomas with the loss of 2 or 3 lives.
Ludwig Holm	Denmark	San Narciso hurricane: The barque capsized and sank in Long Bay, Saint Thomas. She was condemned.
Maggie	Denmark	San Narciso hurricane: The schooner sank at Saint Thomas.
Manuela or Manuelo	United Kingdom	San Narciso hurricane: The schooner sank at Saint Thomas.
Maria and Anna	Netherlands	San Narciso hurricane: The brigantine was driven ashore and severely damaged at Saint Thomas.
Mary Anne	United Kingdom	The schooner was driven ashore at Newcastle, County Down.
Mary Taine	United Kingdom	San Narciso hurricane: The Sloop was sunk at Saint Thomas, Danish West Indies.
Mecosta	United States	San Narciso hurricane: The brigantine was driven ashore and wrecked on the west side of the Harbor of Saint Thomas.
Nanette	Denmark	San Narciso hurricane: The schooner capsized and sank in the western part of the Harbor of Saint Thomas with the loss of two lives.
Narskov or Nordscow	Denmark	San Narciso hurricane: The ship went ashore and was wrecked at the R.M.S. Wharf, Saint Thomas.
Nellie Gray	United States	San Narciso hurricane: The brigantine or Brig, was driven ashore and severely damaged at Saint Thomas.
Nimble	United Kingdom	San Narciso hurricane: The sloop sank at Saint Thomas, Danish West Indies.
Nooit Gedacht	Netherlands	San Narciso hurricane: The schooner was driven ashore at Saint Thomas.
Nordskov	Denmark	San Narciso hurricane: The barque sank at Saint Thomas. She was condemned.
Norman	United Kingdom	San Narciso hurricane: The schooner sank, or driven ashore and wrecked on the west point of Fort Christian at Saint Thomas, Danish West Indies, a total loss.
Nuovo Apollo	Spain	San Narciso hurricane: The ship was wrecked at Havana, Cuba.
Nuovo Apollo	Spain	San Narciso hurricane: The full-rigged ship sank at Puerto Rico.
Ocean Gem	United Kingdom	San Narciso hurricane: The full-rigged ship sank at Saint Thomas, Danish West Indies with the loss of four lives.
Ocean Queen	United Kingdom	San Narciso hurricane: The schooner sank at Saint Thomas.
Onesiphorus	United Kingdom	San Narciso hurricane: The brig was driven ashore and wrecked at Saint Thomas, Danish West Indies.
Oniciphorm	United Kingdom	San Narciso hurricane: The full-rigged ship sank at Saint Thomas, Danish West Indies.
Oriental	Venezuela	San Narciso hurricane: The schooner sank at Saint Thomas, Danish West Indies. 2 crew losr.
Ottilado or Otilia	Spain	San Narciso hurricane: The schooner sank at Saint Thomas.
Palksgen	Flag unknown	San Narciso hurricane: The ship was wrecked at Saint Thomas.
Panchita	Venezuela	San Narciso hurricane: The ship sank at Saint Thomas.
Pelayo	United Kingdom	San Narciso hurricane: The steamship was driven ashore and severely damaged at Saint Thomas. She was later refloated.
Petrel	Denmark	San Narciso hurricane: The schooner was driven ashore on rocks on the south side of Fort Christian, Saint Thomas.
Pigmy	Denmark	San Narciso hurricane: The tug was driven ashore by the gas works and severely damaged at Saint Thomas.
Princess Alice	United Kingdom	San Narciso hurricane: The brig was driven ashore and wrecked at Saint Thomas, Danish West Indies. She was condemned.
Proctor	United Kingdom	San Narciso hurricane: The schooner sank at Saint Thomas, Danish West Indies.
R. Jacobs	United Kingdom	San Narciso hurricane: The brigantine was sunk at the R. M. S. wharf at Saint Thomas, Danish West Indies.
Rapido or Rapida	Spain	San Narciso hurricane: The schooner sank at Saint Thomas, Danish West Indies with the loss of her captain.
Reunion	France	San Narciso hurricane: The ship sank at Saint Thomas, Danish West Indies.
Rhone	United Kingdom	The wreck of Rhone in 2003. San Narciso hurricane: The brig-rigged passenger steamship was wrecked on Black Rock Point off Salt Island, Virgin Islands. She broke in two and incoming seawater exploded her boilers killing 123 people. Only 23, or 25, crew survived. Her stern section was blown up as a hazard to navigation in the 1950s.
Robert Todd	United Kingdom	San Narciso hurricane: The steamship was driven ashore by the gas works and severely damaged at Saint Thomas, Danish West Indies. She was refloated in March 1868. Repaired at Saint John's, Newfoundland Colony. Sold to the Netherlands and renamed Pelebes.
Rose	United Kingdom	The ship ran aground on the Roar Sand. She was on a voyage from Grangemouth, Stirlingshire to Dieppe, Seine-Inférieure, France. She was refloated and assisted in to Dover, Kent in a leaky condition.
R. Scoles	United Kingdom	San Narciso hurricane: The brig was driven ashore and wrecked at Saint Thomas.
Sarah Newman	United States	San Narciso hurricane: The full-rigged ship was driven ashore on a mud bank by the gas works in the western part of the Harbor at Saint Thomas, Danish West Indies.
St. John	United Kingdom	San Narciso hurricane: The Sloop was lost at Saint Thomas, Danish West Indies.
Sylphe	France	San Narciso hurricane: The Schooner sank at Saint Thomas, Danish West Indies. She was later refloated.
Temperance	United Kingdom	The schooner collided with the barque San Antonio (United Kingdom) off Beachy Head, Sussex and was abandoned with the loss of a crew member. Survivors were rescued by San Antonio. Temperance was on a voyage from South Shields, County Durham to Plymouth, Devon.
Thistle	United Kingdom	The ship was driven ashore at Aberdeen. Her crew were rescued by the Aberdeen Lifeboat. She was on a voyage from Aberdeen to Sunderland, County Durham.
Tormadida	Flag unknown	San Narciso hurricane: The ship sank at Saint Thomas.
Treffer	Prussia	San Narciso hurricane: The brig sank at Saint Thomas, Danish West Indies with the loss of two lives. She was condemned.
Tres Hermanos	Spain	San Narciso hurricane: The schooner sank at Saint Thomas with the loss of her captain.
Trial	Netherlands	San Narciso hurricane: The Sloop was driven ashore and wrecked at Saint Thomas, Danish West Indies.
Union	Spain	San Narciso hurricane: The schooner sank at Saint Thomas, Danish West Indies. Her Master was missing.
Urchen	Denmark	San Narciso hurricane: The tug, or steam schooner, was driven ashore and severely damaged on the west side of the harbour at Saint Thomas.
Valkyrien	Denmark	San Narciso hurricane: The brigantine, or Brig, was driven ashore, or sank, at Saint Thomas.
Vasco Núñez de Balboa	Spanish Navy	San Narciso hurricane: The Vasco Núñes de Balboa-class ship of the line was damaged at Saint Thomas with the loss of fifteen of her crew. She was subsequently taken in to Puerto Rico for repairs.
Veloce	France	San Narciso hurricane: The barque sank on the east side of the floating dock at Saint Thomas, Danish West Indies with British Empire (United Kingdom) sinking on top of her, with the loss of four lives.
Velos	Norway	The full-rigged ship was damaged at Saint Thomas. She was condemned.
Velox	United Kingdom	San Narciso hurricane: The ship was damaged at Saint Thomas.
Veloy	United Kingdom	San Narciso hurricane: The ship was driven ashore at Saint Thomas.
Veloz	France	San Narciso hurricane: The barque sank at Saint Thomas.
Veloz	Norway	San Narciso hurricane: The full-rigged ship was driven ashore and damaged near the gas works at Saint Thomas.
Veloz or Velos	Spain	San Narciso hurricane: The schooner was driven ashore at Saint Thomas.
Vice Governor Berg	Denmark	San Narciso hurricane: The tug, was driven ashore and damaged on the west side of the Harbor at Saint Thomas.
Waterwitch	United Kingdom	San Narciso hurricane: The schooner was driven ashore and wrecked at Saint Thomas. She was condemned.
West End Packet	Denmark	San Narciso hurricane: The schooner sank in the north east part of the Harbor of Saint Thomas.
West India Packet	United Kingdom	San Narciso hurricane: The ship sank at Saint Thomas.
Wickham	United Kingdom	San Narciso hurricane: The ship was driven ashore at Saint Thomas.
Wild Pigeon	United Kingdom	San Narciso hurricane: The brig was driven ashore and wrecked on rocks at Saint Thomas, Danish West Indies.
RMS Wye	United Kingdom	San Narciso hurricane: The steamship was wrecked on Buck Island, having just left the Harbor of Saint Thomas, Danish West Indies with the loss of 57 of her 70 crew.
Unnamed	France	San Narciso hurricane: The tug sank at Saint Thomas. She was later refloated.
Three unknown vessels	Flags unknown	San Narciso hurricane: Three coasters were sunk at dock in San Juan, Puerto Rico.
Several unnamed vessels	Flag unknown	San Narciso hurricane: Several ships sunk in the Mona Passage.
Unnamed	France	San Narciso hurricane: The steam tender sank near the coal Wharf, Saint Thomas, Danish West Indies.
Unnamed	Spain	San Narciso hurricane: The brig was driven ashore and wrecked at Santo Domingo, Dominican Republic. Crew rescued.
Unnamed	Spain	San Narciso hurricane: The schooner was driven ashore and wrecked at Santo Domingo, Dominican Republic with the loss of eleven crew.

== 30 October ==
List of shipwrecks: 30 October 1867
Ship	State	Description
Castilian	United Kingdom	The ship caught fire in the River Mersey. She was on a voyage from Liverpool, Lancashire to Rio de Janeiro, Brazil.
Forward	United Kingdom	The ship foundered. She was on a voyage from Arbroath, Forfarshire to Greenock, Renfrewshire.
Hercules	United Kingdom	The ship ran aground. She was on a voyage from Porthcawl, Glamorgan to Valparaíso, Chile. She was refloated and put in to Swansea, Glamorgan.
Mauganna	United Kingdom	The schooner was driven ashore near Belfast, County Antrim.
Royal Charlie	United Kingdom	The ship was driven ashore at Libava Courland Governorate. She had broken up by 2 November.

== 31 October ==
List of shipwrecks: 31 October 1867
Ship	State	Description
Dirkje	Netherlands	The ship was wrecked on the Ballattplaat. She was on a voyage from Amsterdam, North Holland to Bremen.
Hope	(United Kingdom of Great Britain and Ireland) New Zealand	The 25-ton schooner grounded and was wrecked on Rurima Island's reef in the Bay of Plenty.
Mountaineer	United Kingdom	The ship was driven ashore at Rhosneigr, Anglesey. She was on a voyage from Harbour Grace, Colony of Newfoundland to Liverpool, Lancashire. Mountaineer was refloated on 6 November and taken in to Holyhead, Anglesey.
Rosa Eliza	Hamburg	The steamship foundered off the Leman Sand, in the North Sea. Her crew were rescued by the barque Urania (Norway). Rosa Eliza was on a voyage from Hamburg to London, United Kingdom.
Salve	United Kingdom	The ship was wrecked near Havana, Cuba. She was on a voyage from St. Jago de Cuba, Cuba to Falmouth, Cornwall.
Stanley	United Kingdom	The ship was driven ashore and wrecked on São Miguel Island, Azores. Her crew were rescued.
St. Brieux	France	The brig was damaged by an onboard explosion at Cardiff, Glamorgan, United Kingdom. She was on a voyage from Cardiff to Trieste.

== Unknown date ==
List of shipwrecks: Unknown date in October 1867
Ship	State	Description
Alpha	United Kingdom	The ship was driven ashore on Skagen, Denmark. She was on a voyage from Saint Petersburg, Russia to Leith, Lothian. She was refloated and taken in to Fredrikshavn, Denmark, where she arrived on 23 October.
Amazon	Canada	The brigantine was driven ashore on Cape Breton Island, Nova Scotia and was abandoned. Salvaged in 1868, repaired and returned to service as Mary Celeste.
Antilles	Greece	The brig was driven ashore.
Asphodel	United Kingdom	The ship was driven ashore in the Southwest Pass. She was on a voyage from Liverpool, Lancashire to New Orleans, Louisiana, United States. She was refloated and resumed her voyage, arriving on 14 October.
Carmen	Spain	The barque was driven ashore in the Southwest Pass. She was on a voyage from Havana, Cuba to New Orleans.
Concord	United Kingdom	The barque was wrecked on "Tobasco Island" before 3 October. Her crew survived. She was on a voyage from Liverpool to Pará, Brazil.
Confidence	United Kingdom	The ship ran aground on a reef off Governors Island, New York and was damaged. She was on a voyage from New York City to Glasgow, Renfrewshire. She was refloated and put back to New York City in a leaky condition.
Eden	United Kingdom	The ship ran aground at Yeni-Kale, Ottoman Empire and was severely damaged. She was on a voyage from Taganrog, Russia to Liverpool.
Elba	Italy	The barque was run down and sunk by a Russian steamship.
Eleanor Woodburn	United Kingdom	The schooner was abandoned with the loss of all four crew. She was on a voyage from Barrow-in-Furness, Cumberland to Belfast, County Antrim.
Hillmann Scharstorff	Russia	The ship was driven ashore at Yeni-Kale before 21 October. She was on a voyage from Taganrog to a British port. She was later refloated and resumed her voyage.
Jeanneth Rentine	Belgium	The ship collided with the barque Thrases (United Kingdom) and sank. She was on a voyage from Buenos Aires to Antwerp.
J. G. Portales	United Kingdom	The ship was driven ashore in Freshwater Bay, Strait of Magellan before 9 October. Her crew were rescued by HMS Camelion (Royal Navy).
Jubilant	United Kingdom	The steamship collided with Mansanito (United Kingdom) and sank in the Atlantic Ocean off Lisbon, Portugal. She was on a voyage from London to Constantinople, Ottoman Empire.
Julia Dash	United States	The ship was wrecked in the Magdalen Islands, Nova Scotia with the loss of all 25 crew.
Kingsotn	United Kingdom	The ship ran aground on Salmon Island. She was on a voyage from Marseille, Bouches-du-Rhône, France to Bathurst, Gambia Colony and Protectorate. She was refloated and completed her voyage, arriving on 14 October.
Lady Douglas	United Kingdom	The ship ran aground before 18 October. She put in to Bathurst, where she was condemned.
Malespina	(Spain) Spanish East Indies	The steamship was reported missing in the South China Sea in mid-October following a typhoon.
Mathilde	Norway	The ship foundered. She was on a voyage from Trapani, Sicily, Italy to Bergen.
Mercia	United Kingdom	The steamship was wrecked at "Callingapatam", India before 5 October.
Palace	United Kingdom	The barque was driven ashore at Galveston, Texas, United States. She was refloated on 14 January 1869.
Par Hazard	United Kingdom	The barque was run ashore on Luzon, Spanish East Indies before 7 October. She was on a voyage from Manila, Spanish East Indies to New York City.
Paulina	United Kingdom	The ship was wrecked on the coast of Labrador, Newfoundland Colony.
San Vincente de Paulo	Portugal	The full-rigged ship was lost in the Sunda Strait.
Scotswood	United Kingdom	The ship was abandoned in the Atlantic Ocean. Her crew were rescued by an American fishing schooner. She was on a voyage from Quebec City, Canada to South Shields. Scotswood was subsequently discovered by the schooner Clogha ( Canada), which put six crew on board. They took her in to Port Hawkesbury, Nova Scotia, Canada, where she was placed under repair.
Shooting Star	United Kingdom	The ship was wrecked near Milford Haven, Pembrokeshire.
Thomas Brown	United Kingdom	The ship ran aground in the Min River. She was refloated and resumed her voyage.
Venise	France	The schooner foundered at sea before 10 October. Her crew were rescued by Deux Reines (France). Venise was on a voyage from Bilbao, Spain to Cardiff, Glamorgan, United Kingdom.
Zone	United Kingdom	The ship foundered off the Falkland Islands. She was on a voyage from the Clyde to "Hambayegne".
Unnamed	Flag unknown	The ship was lost in the Gut of Canso with the loss of all hands.
