= Copeland Islands (disambiguation) =

Copeland Islands may refer to:

- Copeland Islands, Northern Ireland
- Copeland Islands (Nunavut), Canada
- Copeland Islands Marine Provincial Park, British Columbia, Canada, and the eponymous islands
