= Plover (disambiguation) =

A plover is a type of wading bird.

Plover may also refer to:

== Birds ==
- Masked lapwing, a related bird species commonly known as "plovers" in Australia

== Places ==
Canada

- Plover Islands, Nunavut

China

- Plover Cove, a cove in Hong Kong

United Kingdom

- Plover Hill, in the Yorkshire Dales

United States

- Plover, Iowa
- Plover, Wisconsin, a village in Portage County
- Plover, Portage County, Wisconsin, a town adjacent to the village
- Plover, Marathon County, Wisconsin, a town
- Plover River, a river in Wisconsin

== Other ==
- HMS Plover, a number of ships of the Royal Navy
- Plover-class gunvessel, a 19th-century class of Royal Navy ships
- MV Plover, a ferry in the US state of Washington
- Plover (1788 ship), a British slave ship
- The Plover Project, an open source stenography engine
- Plover eggs, a traditional wild-gathered food
