= Al'bov Rocks =

Rock formations in Antarctica

- Location within Antarctica

Geography
- Location: Antarctica
- Coordinates: 66°28′S 126°45′E

Administration
- Administered under the Antarctic Treaty System

Demographics
- Population: Uninhabited

Al'bov Rocks is a cluster of rock outcrops close south of Cape Spieden on the west side of Porpoise Bay, Antarctica. Charted by the Soviet Antarctic Expedition (1958) and named for Nikolay M. Al'bov (1806–99), Russian botanical geographer, explorer of Tierra del Fuego.
