= Arkösund =

- Smaller locality
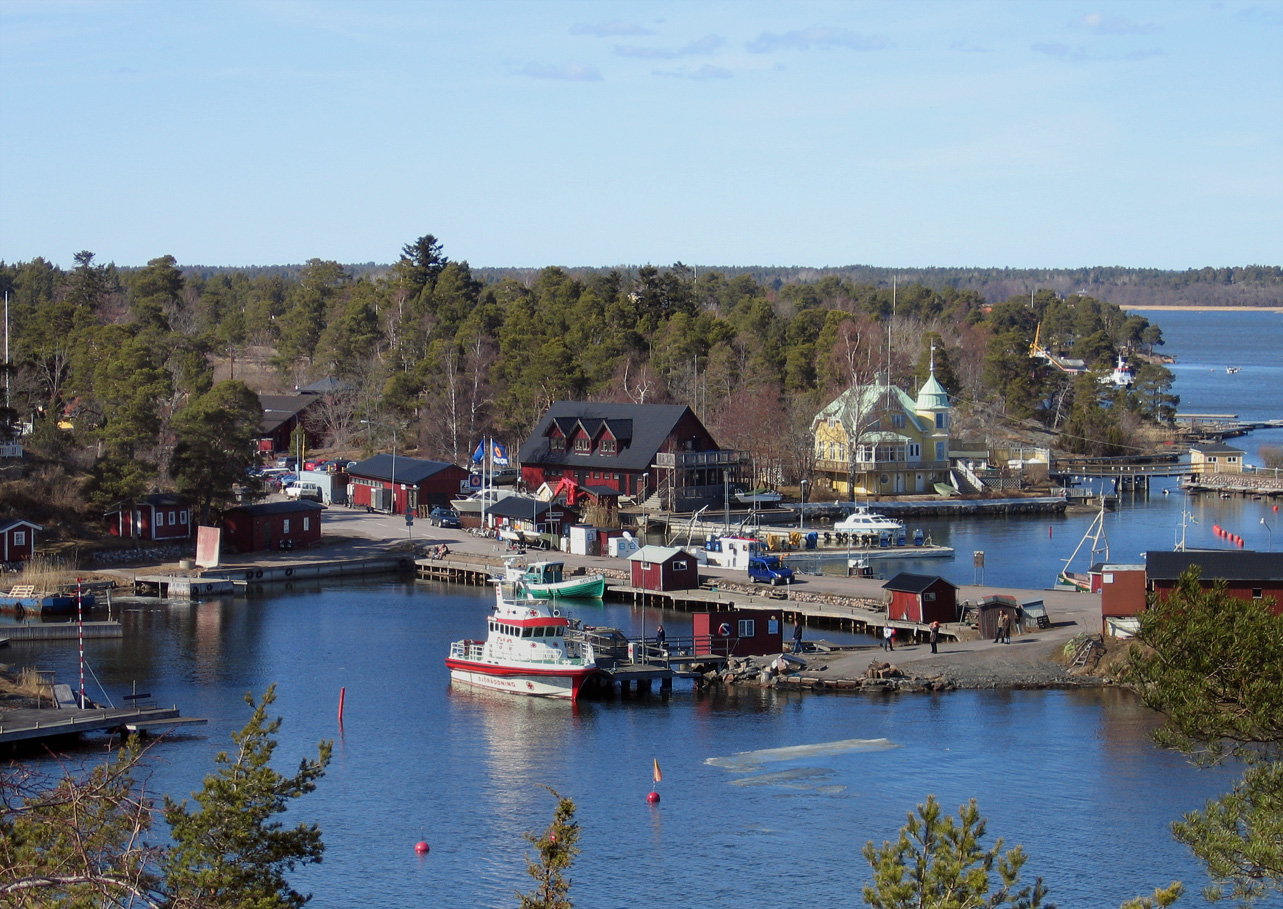
- Arkösund

- Location within Östergötland Location within Sweden
- Coordinates: 58°29′N 16°56′E
- Country: Sweden
- Province: Östergötland
- County: Östergötland County
- Municipality: Norrköping Municipality

Area
  - Total: 135 ha (330 acres)

Population (2015)
  - Total: 172
  - Density: 127/km^{2} (330/sq mi)
- Time zone: UTC+1 (CET)
  - Summer (DST): UTC+2 (CEST)
- Smaller locality code: S1369

Arkösund is a small village on the Swedish East Coast, on Vikbolandet peninsula, Norrköping Municipality with 172 inhabitants in 2015. Its population swells in the summer, when the yacht people arrive to anchor up in the marina to shop for food. It is most famous for its archipelago (Sankt Anna archipelago, part of the Östergötland archipelago) — many small islands can easily be reached by boat from the harbour.

During the summer season of 2007 an estimated 40,000 tourists visited Arkösund.
