= Fidler-Greywillow Wildland Provincial Park =

Protected area in northern Alberta, Canada

Fidler-Greywillow Wildland Park
- Fidler-Greywillow Wildland Provincial Park
- IUCN category Ib (wilderness area)
- Location within Alberta Location within Canada Location within Regional Municipality of Wood Buffalo
- Interactive map of Fidler-Greywillow Wildland Park
- Location: Regional Municipality of Wood Buffalo, Alberta, Canada
- Nearest city: Fort Chipewyan
- Coordinates: 58°56′11″N 110°37′8″W
- Area: 6,520.625 hectares (16,112.82 acres)
- Created: March 1998
- Established: March 1998
- Operator: Alberta Parks
- Website: Fidler-Greywillow Wildland Provincial Park

Fidler-Greywillow Wildland Park is a wildland provincial park located in northeastern Alberta, Canada within the Regional Municipality of Wood Buffalo. Summer activities include activities back-country camping, hunting, kayaking, and fishing, and winters offer snowmobiling. Random backcountry camping is allowed on Bustard Island.

== Geography ==
The Fidler-Greywillow Wildland Park lies within the natural regions of the Canadian Shield (Kazan Upland), and the Boreal Forest (Athabasca Plain.)

The park starts at an unnamed creek along the northwest shore of Lake Athabasca near Fidler Point. It also encompasses several islands in the lake; these include Bustard Island, Burntwood Island, and the Lucas Islands To the southeast of Burntwood Island is Egg Island a small island part of the Egg Island Ecological Reserve.

== Flora ==
Forbs specimens included; Drosera anglica (Oblong-leaved sundew), Menyanthes trifoliata (Buck-bean), Triglochin maritima (Side arrow grass). Graminoids specimens included; Carex chordorrhiza (Prostrate sedge), Carex lasiocarpa (Woollyfruit sedge), Carex limosa (mud sedge), Carex rostrata (Beaked sedge), Juncus stygius (Marsh rush), Scheuchzeria palustris (Scheuchzeria). Bryophytes specimens included; Sphagnum angustifolium (fine peat/bogmoss), Warnstorfia exannulata (brown peat moss).

Common trees found on the mainland and islands includes black spruce (Picea mariana), jack pine (Pinus banksiana), white spruce (Picea glauca), and paper birch (Betula papyrifera) In a 2005 study of flora in the park, the first record of Carex echinata (star sedge) was found on Burntwood Island.

== Transportation ==
Travel to the park is by float-plane from Fort McMurray, or by boat from Fort Chipewyan. There are no summer access roads that run into the park.

== See also ==
- List of provincial parks in Alberta
- List of Canadian provincial parks
- List of National Parks of Canada
