= Copeland Islands (Nunavut) =

Island group in Nunavut, Canada

- Location within Nunavut Location within Canada

Geography
- Location: Gulf of Boothia
- Coordinates: 70°5′59″N 091°52′00″W
- Archipelago: Canadian Arctic Archipelago

Administration
- Canada
- Territory: Nunavut
- Region: Kitikmeot

Demographics
- Population: Uninhabited

The Copeland Islands are members of the Canadian Arctic Archipelago in the territory of Nunavut. They are located in western Gulf of Boothia at the mouth of Thom Bay, east of the Boothia Peninsula. The Martin Islands are to the north; the Hecla and Fury Islands are to the east.
