= Gretha Islands =

Island group in Nunavut, Canada

- Location within Nunavut Location within Canada

Geography
- Location: Eureka Sound
- Coordinates: 78°55′N 084°30′W
- Archipelago: Sverdrup Islands; Queen Elizabeth Islands; Arctic Archipelago
- Total islands: 3

Administration
- Canada
- Territory: Nunavut
- Region: Qikiqtaaluk

Demographics
- Population: Uninhabited

The Gretha Islands (variant: Grethas Ōer) are an uninhabited island group located in the Qikiqtaaluk Region of Nunavut, Canada. They are situated in Eureka Sound at the confluence of Bay Fjord, north of Ellesmere Island's Raanes Peninsula, and east of Stor Island. They are members of the Sverdrup Islands group, Queen Elizabeth Islands, and the Arctic Archipelago.

The three Gretha Islands were named by the Norwegian explorer Otto Sverdrup.
