= Norths Highland =

Upland in Antractica

Norths Highland (66°40′S 126°0′E) is an ice-covered upland close south of Cape Goodenough, surmounting the Banzare Coast between Maury and Porpoise Bays. The name "North's High Land" after James H. North, acting master on the brig Porpoise, was applied to an elevated coastal area by the United States Exploring Expedition (1838–42) under Wilkes. Subsequently, because of inadequate data regarding the nature of this feature, the name "Norths Coast" was applied to a coastal area in the vicinity of 12745E Advisory Committee on Antarctic Names (US-ACAN)'s identification of Norths Highland is based upon correlation of Wilkes' chart with Gardner Dean Blodgett's reconnaissance map (1955) compiled from air photos taken by U.S. Navy Operation Highjump (1946–47). The name is adopted for this recently verified upland region in 12600E in keeping with Wilkes' original naming.
