= Cape Spieden =

Cape on the coast of Antarctica

Coordinates: 66°25′S 126°44′E

Cape Spieden is a cape along the western shore of Porpoise Bay, about 17 nautical miles (31 km) southeast of Cape Goodenough. Delineated from aerial photographs taken by U.S. Navy Operation Highjump (1946–47), and named by Advisory Committee on Antarctic Names (US-ACAN) after William Spieden, Purser on the sloop Peacock during the United States Exploring Expedition (1838–1842) under Lieutenant Charles Wilkes.
