= Minto Islands =

Island group in Nunavut, Canada

- Location within Nunavut Location within Canada

Geography
- Location: Northern Canada
- Coordinates: 68°34′N 105°15′W
- Archipelago: Arctic Archipelago
- Area: 2 km^{2} (0.77 sq mi)

Administration
- Canada
- Territory: Nunavut
- Region: Kitikmeot

The Minto Islands are a Canadian Arctic island group in the Nunavut Territory. The islands lie in the western portion of Queen Maud Gulf, between Kent Peninsula on Nunavut's mainland, and Melbourne Island. Back Point, Victoria Island is approximately 47.9 km (29.8 mi) to the north.

In early spring, the Minto Islands are a caribou migration path from the mainland back northward to Victoria Island.

The islands are named after Gilbert Elliot-Murray-Kynynmound, 2nd Earl of Minto, first lord of the admiralty from 1835 to 1841, during the expedition of Sir John Henry Pelly, governor of the Hudson's Bay Company.

In July 1839, Sir George Back explored the region as well.
