= Keith Islands =

Island group in Nunavut, Canada

- Location within Nunavut Location within Canada

Geography
- Location: Northern Canada
- Coordinates: 67°54′N 102°10′W
- Archipelago: Arctic Archipelago

Administration
- Canada
- Territory: Nunavut
- Region: Kitikmeot

The Keith Islands are a Canadian Arctic island group in the Nunavut Territory. The islands lie in Queen Maud Gulf, north of Nunavut mainland's Ogden Bay, between Bowes Point and Armark.
