= Karakaralong Islands =

Islands in Indonesia

Coordinates: 4.1549902°N 126.7696665°E

Karakaralong Islands is a group of seismically active islands in Indonesia closest to Mindanao, Philippines. To the immediate south are the Sangihe Islands.
