= Södermanland archipelago =

Coordinates: 58°42′N 17°17′E

The Södermanland archipelago (Swedish: Södermanlands skärgård or Sörmlands skärgård) is the archipelago of Södermanland County in Sweden.

It is located in the Baltic Sea and have 5,371 islands. The Södermanland archipelago is connected to the Stockholm archipelago in the north and to the Östergötland archipelago in the south.
