= Arvalik Islands =

Islands in the Qikiqtaaluk region of Canada

- Location within Nunavut Location within Canada

Geography
- Location: Northern Canada
- Coordinates: 58°36′0″N 66°38′59″W

Administration
- Canada
- Nunavut: Nunavut
- Region: Qikiqtaaluk

Demographics
- Population: Uninhabited

The uninhabited Arvalik Islands are part of the Qikiqtaaluk Region, in the Canadian territory of Nunavut. They are located in southeastern Ungava Bay, southwest of the Inuit hamlet of Kangiqsualujjuaq, Quebec and north of Imirqutailaisitik Island.
