= Monk Islands =

The Monk Islands (60°40′S 45°55′W) are a group of very small islands and rocks lying 1.5 nautical miles (3 km) south of Meier Point, off the south coast of Coronation Island in the South Orkney Islands off Antarctica. They were first charted and named "Munken" (The Monk) by Norwegian whaling captain Petter Sørlle in 1912–13. The name approved is an anglicized form of the earlier Norwegian name appearing on the chart by Discovery Investigations personnel on the Discovery II, who surveyed the islands in 1933.

== See also ==
- List of antarctic and sub-antarctic islands
