= Raanes Peninsula =

Peninsula in Nunavut, Canada

Coordinates: 78°19′N 086°19′W

The Raanes Peninsula is located on the southwestern coast of Ellesmere Island, a part of the Qikiqtaaluk Region of the Canadian territory of Nunavut. Axel Heiberg Island is approximately 15 km (9.3 mi) to the west.
