= Bishop and Clerk Islets =

Group of islands near Macquarie Island, Australia

- Location within Oceania

Geography
- Location: Southwestern Pacific Ocean
- Coordinates: 55°07′S 158°41′E
- Area: 60 ha (150 acres)
- Highest elevation: 45 m (148 ft)

Administration
- Australia
- State: Tasmania
- LGA: Huon Valley Council

Demographics
- Population: uninhabited

Additional information
- Time zone: AEST (UTC+10:00)
  - Summer (DST): AEDT (UTC+11:00)

UNESCO World Heritage Site
- Type: Natural
- Criteria: vii, viii
- Designated: 1997 (21st session)
- Reference no.: 629
- Region: Asia-Pacific

The Bishop and Clerk Islets are a 60-hectare (150-acre) group of islets, lying 33 kilometres (21 mi) south of Macquarie Island in the southwestern Pacific Ocean. They are, with Macquarie Island, part of the Australian state of Tasmania. The group consists of Bishop Islet, 24 smaller islets, and various rocks and reefs. Bishop Islet has an area of 3 hectares (7.4 acres) and is mostly rock with some shallow patches of soil. Its highest elevation is 45 metres (148 ft).

The Bishop and Clerk Islets are the southernmost terrestrial point of both Australia (excluding the Australian Antarctic Territory) and Tasmania. The islets are within the Macquarie Island Nature Reserve, managed by the Tasmanian Parks and Wildlife Service and along with Macquarie Island and the Judge and Clerk Islets, were inscribed in 1997 on the UNESCO World Heritage Area, and form a Special Management Area within the nature reserve. They are very infrequently visited and are free of introduced animals and plants.

== History ==
Three known landings have been made on the islets, all by ship-assisted helicopter. The first, in 1965, was on a rock 50 metres (160 ft) from Bishop Isle. The following two, in 1976 and 1993, were on Bishop Islet itself.

== Ecology ==
Macquarie shags have been recorded nesting at the Bishop and Clerk Islets. A colony of black-browed albatrosses was discovered in 1965.

The only vascular plant recorded on Bishop Islet is Colobanthus muscoides, while two varieties of lichens have also been noted.

== See also ==
- Judge and Clerk Islets
- List of Antarctic and sub-Antarctic islands
- List of islands of Tasmania
