= Judge and Clerk Islets =

Two small islands in vicinity of Macquarie Island, Australia

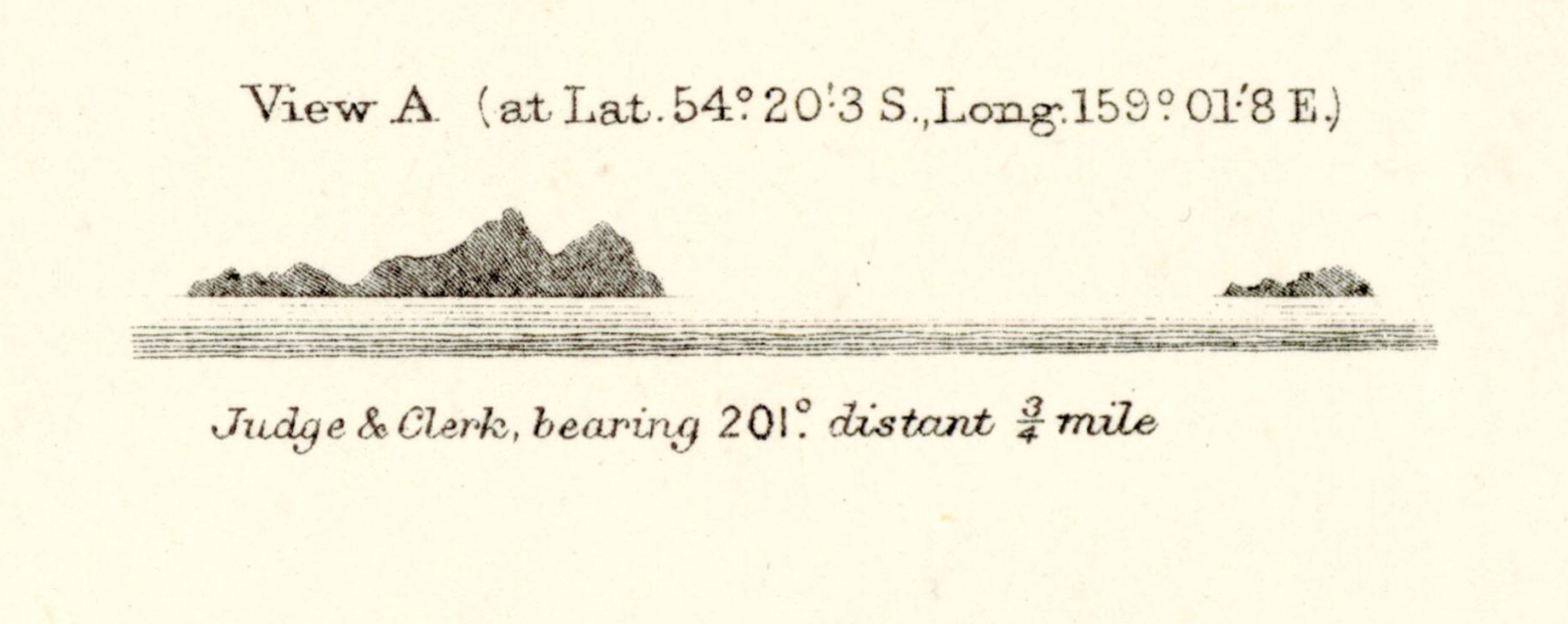
- Drawing on nautical chart of 1950

- Location within Oceania

Geography
- Location: Southwestern Pacific Ocean
- Coordinates: 54°21′S 159°00′E
- Area: 20 ha (49 acres)

Administration
- Australia
- State: Tasmania
- LGA: Huon Valley Council

Demographics
- Population: uninhabited

Additional information
- Time zone: AEST (UTC+10:00)
  - Summer (DST): AEDT (UTC+11:00)

UNESCO World Heritage Site
- Type: Natural
- Criteria: vii, viii
- Designated: 1997 (21st session)
- Reference no.: 629
- Region: Asia-Pacific

The Judge and Clerk Islets are small islands, with a total land and reef area of no more than 20 hectares (49 acres), lying 11 kilometres (6.8 mi) north of Macquarie Island in the southwestern Pacific Ocean. They are, with Macquarie Island, part of Tasmania, Australia. They are in the Macquarie Island Nature Reserve and were inscribed in 1997 on the UNESCO World Heritage Area, and form a Special Management Area within the nature reserve. They are very infrequently visited and are free of introduced animals and plants. During a research voyage by MV Thala Dan in February 1976, a survey of the islets revealed "green coloration, probably algal" but no other vegetation.

== See also ==
- Bishop and Clerk Islets
- List of Antarctic and sub-Antarctic islands
- List of islands of Tasmania
