= Tasmania Islands =

Island group in Nunavut, Canada

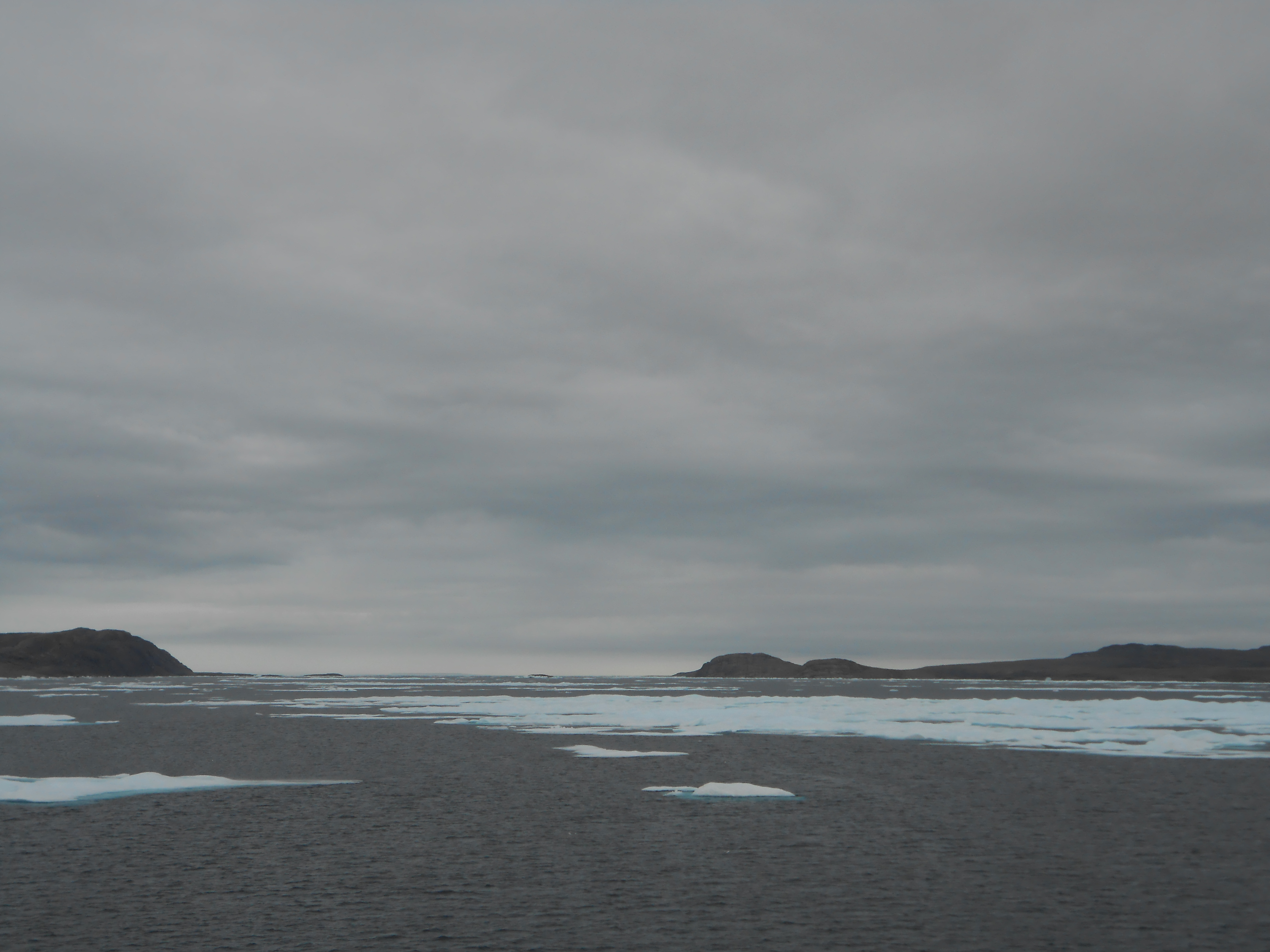
- Tasmania Islands, Franklin Strait, Canada

- Location within Nunavut Location within Canada

Geography
- Location: Franklin Strait
- Coordinates: 71°16′N 096°35′W
- Archipelago: Arctic Archipelago
- Area: 47 km^{2} (18 sq mi)
- Highest elevation: 168 m (551 ft)

Administration
- Canada
- Territory: Nunavut
- Region: Kitikmeot

Demographics
- Population: Uninhabited

The Tasmania Islands are a group of uninhabited islands located in the Kitikmeot Region of the Canadian territory of Nunavut. Part of the Arctic Archipelago, the island's are located in Franklin Strait, just west of Boothia Peninsula, which is part of the mainland.

The islands received their name in 1859 from arctic explorer Francis McClintock, during his expedition to find evidence of the fate of Franklin's lost expedition. He named the islands at the request of Franklin's widow, who sponsored his expedition. Franklin had been a popular governor of Tasmania, and significant funds had been raised from there for the several searches which Jane Franklin sponsored.
