= Cape Goodenough =

Cape in Norths Highland, Antarctica

Cape Goodenough (66°16′S 126°10′E) is an ice-covered cape marking the west side of the entrance to Porpoise Bay and forming the northernmost projection of Norths Highland in Antarctica. It was discovered by the British Australian New Zealand Antarctic Research Expedition under Douglas Mawson on an airplane flight in January 1931, and was named by Mawson for Admiral Sir William Goodenough, President of the Council of the Royal Geographical Society from 1930 to 1933.
