= Flensing Islands =

Group of small islands in Antarctic

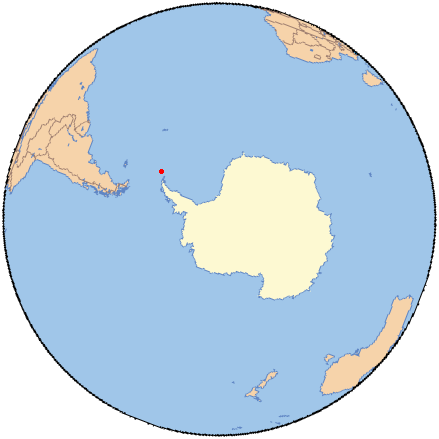
Flensing Islands

The Flensing Islands (60°42′S 45°41′W) are a group of small islands lying 1 nautical mile (2 km) west of Foca Point on the west side of Signy Island, in the South Orkney Islands. The islands were named "Flenserne" on a chart of 1912–13 by Norwegian whaling captain Petter Sorlle. The name Flensing Islands, suggested by the earlier Norwegian name, was used by Discovery Investigations personnel on the Discovery II who surveyed the group in 1933. Flensing is the process of stripping skin and blubber from whales.
