= Marcopeet Islands =

Island group in Nunavut, Canada

Marcopeet islands
- Location within Nunavut Location within Canada

Geography
- Location: Hudson Bay
- Coordinates: 57°55′N 79°39′W
- Archipelago: Arctic Archipelago
- Area: 2 km^{2} (0.77 sq mi)

Administration
- Canada
- Territory: Nunavut
- Region: Qikiqtaaluk

Demographics
- Population: Uninhabited

The Marcopeet Islands are members of the Arctic Archipelago in the territory of Nunavut in Canada. They are located in Hudson Bay, northwest of the Belcher Islands. The Marcopeet Islands measure 2 km^{2} (0.77 sq mi).
