= Payne Islands =

Island group in Nunavut, Canada

- Location within Nunavut Location within Canada

Geography
- Location: Northern Canada
- Coordinates: 59.96°N 69.69°W
- Archipelago: Arctic Archipelago; Ungava Bay Archipelago
- Total islands: 100 (Plover Islands and Payne Islands combined)
- Area: 1,250 km^{2} (480 sq mi) (Plover Islands and Payne Islands combined)

Administration
- Canada
- Nunavut: Nunavut
- Region: Qikiqtaaluk

Demographics
- Population: Uninhabited

The uninhabited Payne Islands are an archipelago, members of the Arctic Archipelago and the Ungava Bay Archipelago, in the Qikiqtaaluk Region of Nunavut, Canada. They are located in Payne Bay, a waterway in western Ungava Bay, just east of the Arnaud River (formerly the Payne River) and the community of Kangirsuk on Quebec's Ungava Peninsula.

Note: The Atlas of Canada does not recognise this appellation; presumably the Payne Islands are the islets of Nanuk, Agvik, and Akunok.

== Geography ==
The islands have a hard granitic gneiss and a thin layer of soil. Their perimeter measures approximately 3 km (1.9 mi).

== Flora ==
Their habitat includes lichen, moss, sedges, and low woody shrubs.

== Fauna ==
Combined with the Plover Islands, the Payne Islands are a Canadian Important Bird Area (#NU027). Notable bird species include the common eider and colonial waterbirds/seabirds.

The Payne Islands are a part of the Ungava Bay Archipelagoes, a Key Migratory Terrestrial Bird Site (NU Site 51).
