= Bustard Island =

Lake island in Alberta, Canada

- Location within Alberta Location within Canada

Geography
- Location: Regional Municipality of Wood Buffalo, Alberta, Canada
- Coordinates: 58°47′42″N 110°43′53″W

Administration
- Canada, Alberta

Bustard Island is Alberta's largest sand island, It is located in Lake Athabasca in the part of the Fidler-Greywillow Wildland Provincial Park. The Lucas Islands lie northeast from the island, the other major island in the park; Burntwood Island lays 11.8 kilometres (7.3 mi) to the north.

== Geography ==
Storm beaches can be found around the island with sand shores, as well as rock points. It is located about 4.8 kilometres (3.0 mi) from shore at Shelter Point to the northwest and is part of the Athabasca Plains sub-region of the Canadian Shield. There are two internal lagoons on the island. The island has very few wetland/aquatic areas, the best documented is the large lagoon on the east side of the island. Leymus mollis (American dune grass) is common the most on the sandy shores of the island. The island hosts large colonies of California gull.
