= Low Islands =

Island group in Nunavut, Canada

- Location within Nunavut Location within Canada

Geography
- Location: Ungava Bay
- Coordinates: 59°32′N 69°22′W

Administration
- Canada
- Nunavut: Nunavut
- Region: Qikiqtaaluk

Demographics
- Population: Uninhabited
- Source: Low Islands at Atlas of Canada

The Low Islands are one of the many uninhabited Canadian arctic island groups in Qikiqtaaluk Region, Nunavut. They are located in Ungava Bay, stretching between Young Island to the south and Lookout Island to the north.
