= Hecla and Fury Islands =

Island group in Nunavut, Canada

- Location within Nunavut Location within Canada

Geography
- Location: Gulf of Boothia
- Coordinates: 70°05′N 090°31′W
- Archipelago: Canadian Arctic Archipelago
- Area: 2 km^{2} (0.77 sq mi)

Administration
- Canada
- Territory: Nunavut
- Region: Kitikmeot

Demographics
- Population: Uninhabited

The Hecla and Fury Islands are members of the Canadian Arctic Archipelago in the territory of Nunavut. They are located in western Gulf of Boothia, near the Boothia Peninsula, and southeast of Martin Islands.
