= Solomons Temple Islands =

Island group in Nunavut, Canada

- Location within Nunavut Location within Canada

Geography
- Location: Northern Canada
- Coordinates: 52°49′29″N 079°9′00″W
- Archipelago: Arctic Archipelago

Administration
- Canada
- Nunavut: Nunavut
- Region: Qikiqtaaluk

Demographics
- Population: Uninhabited

The Solomons Temple Islands (variants: Solomon's Temple Islands; Solomons Temple Island) are an uninhabited Canadian arctic islands group located within the midsection of James Bay in Nunavut, Canada. They are situated north of Charlton Island, and southwest of Paint Hills Islands, Pointe au Huard and Andrew Moar Bay (52.8°N 78.8°W),

Solomons Temple Islands are 4 km (2.5 mi) in size.

== History ==
In 1950, Thomas Henry Manning studied unusually high tide driftwood strand lines on Solomons Temple's northern exposed beach.
