= Syrezol Rocks =

Marine rocks off the coast of King George Island in the South Shetland Islands

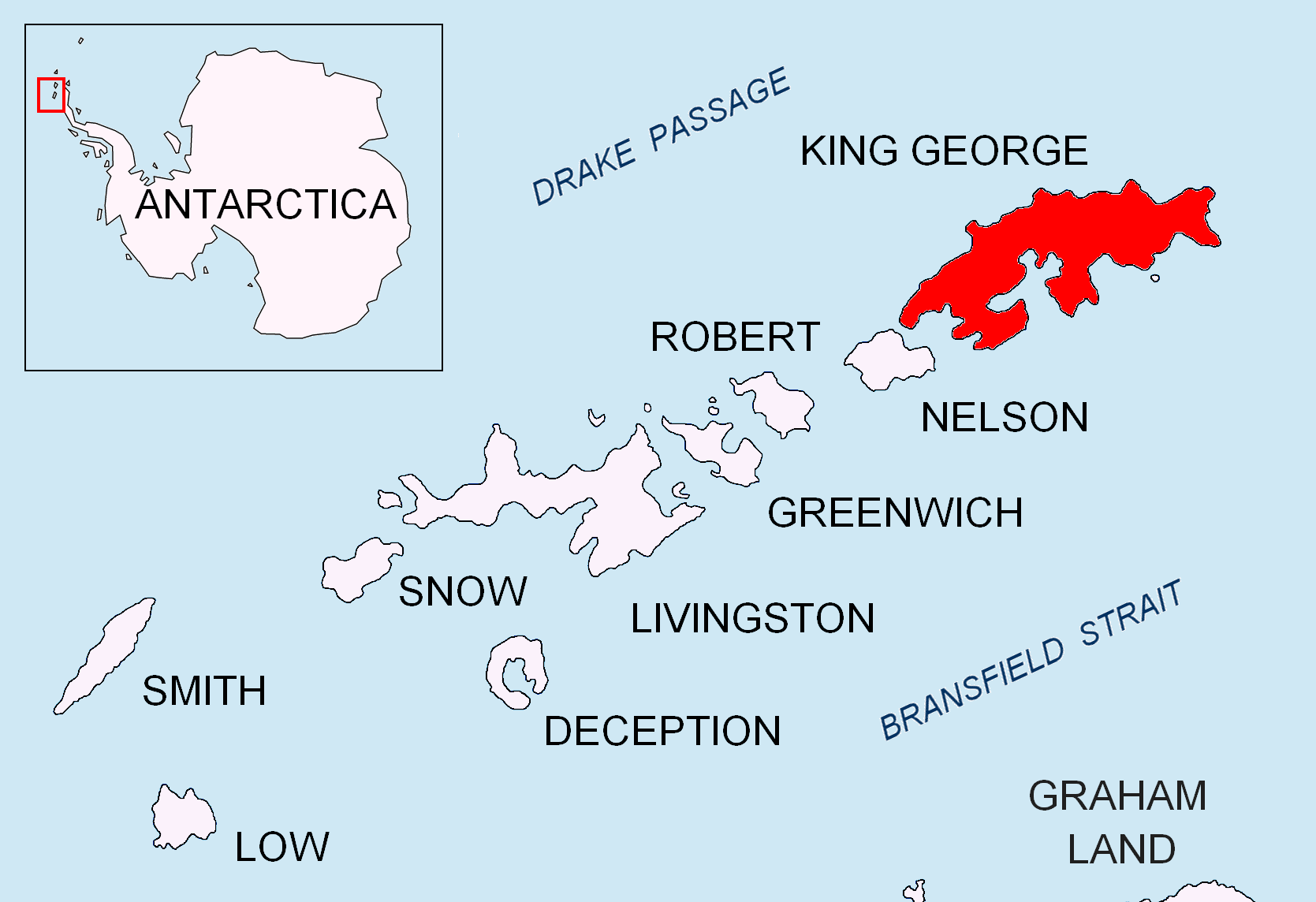
Location of King George Island in the South Shetland Islands

The Syrezol Rocks (62°11′S 58°17′W) are a small group of marine rocks lying 1 mile (1.6 km) west of Martins Head at the east side of the entrance to Admiralty Bay, near King George Island in the South Shetland Islands. In 1908–1910, the Fourth French Antarctic Expedition under Jean-Baptiste Charcot assigned the name "Cap Syrezol" to a feature between what is now Martins Head and Chabrier Rock. Since there is no distinctive point or cape in this position, the name has been applied to these rocks in order to preserve Charcot's naming in the area in which it was originally given.
