= Logo Islands =

Artificial islands in Dubai, UAE

Coordinates: 25.115°N 55.156°E

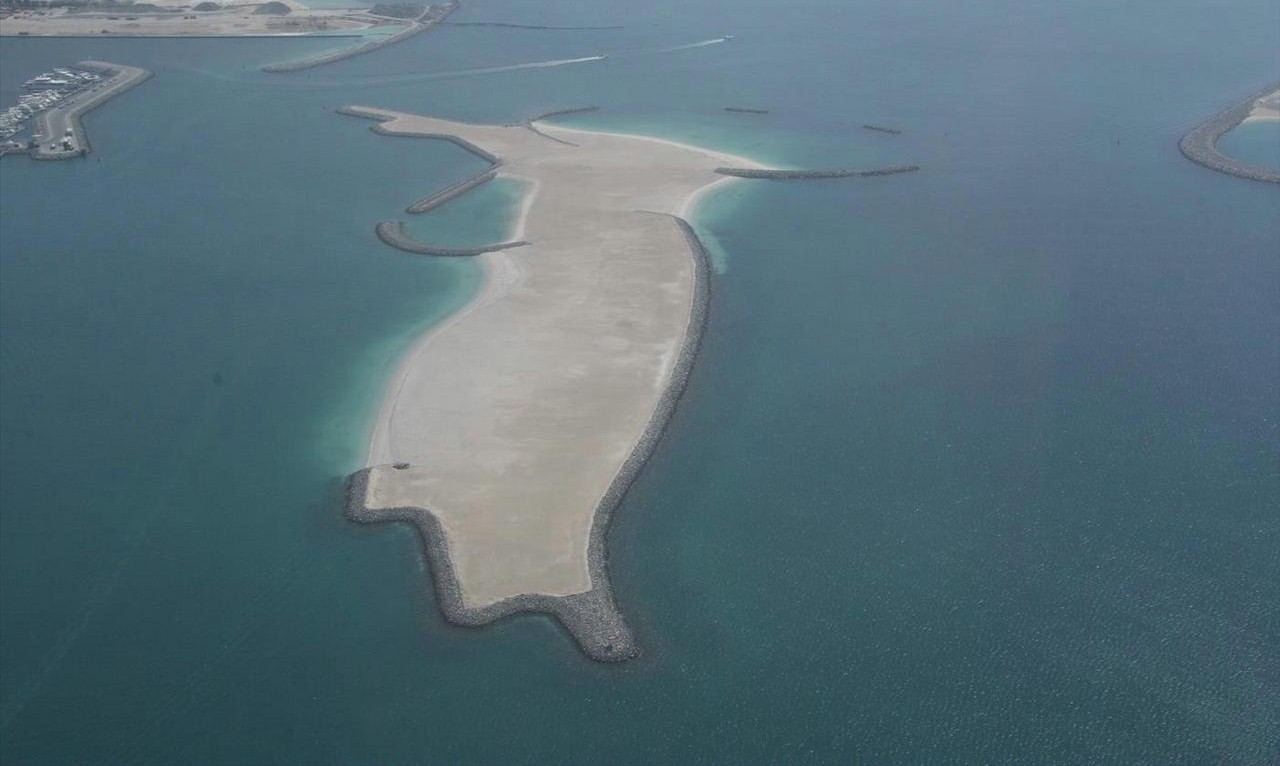
One of the islands

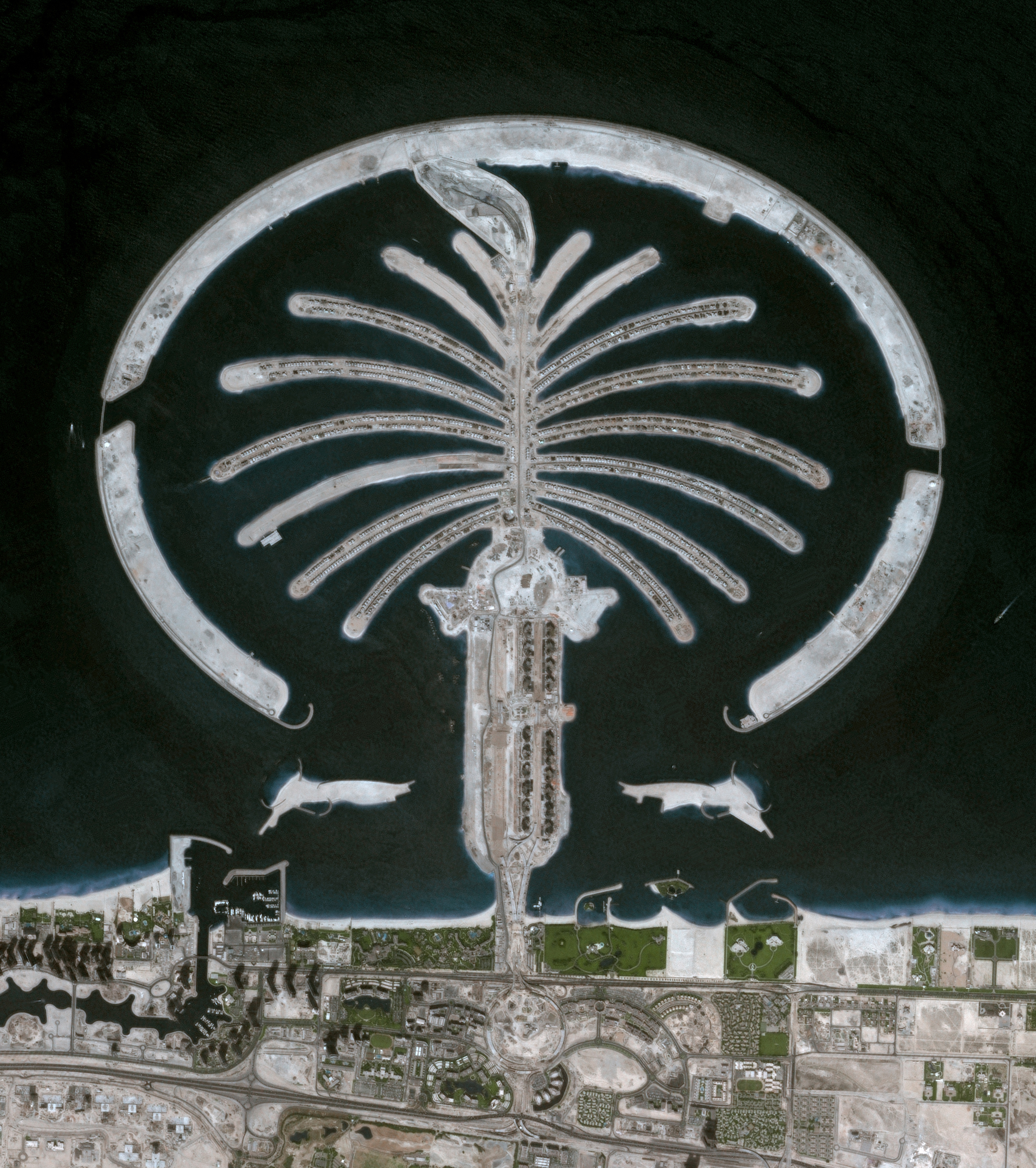
Logo Islands location below Palm Jumeirah. The left side island would become Emaar Beachfront and Dubai Harbour in the future.

The Logo Islands are two identical artificial islands built in the shape of a palm leaf, located directly beneath the Palm Jumeirah. The islands were built of 4.9 million cubic feet of sand and were meant to represent the branding logo of Palm Jumeirah. However, now it has been redeveloped and called Dubai Harbour, which has an area of 20,000,000 sq.ft / 195 hectares whereas Emaar Properties is developing the left side island as a new community named Emaar Beachfront, consisting of 24 towers. On the other side of the Dubai Harbour, another developer has developed the biggest cruise terminal in the MENA region.

== See also ==
- Palm Islands
