= Paint Hills Islands =

Island group in Nunavut, Canada

- Location within Nunavut Location within Canada

Geography
- Location: Northern Canada
- Coordinates: 52°57′N 079°01′W

Administration
- Canada
- Nunavut: Nunavut
- Region: Qikiqtaaluk

Demographics
- Population: Uninhabited
- Source: Paint Hills Islands at Atlas of Canada

The Paint Hills Islands are located in James Bay, a part of the Qikiqtaaluk Region, in the Canadian territory of Nunavut. They are southwest of Wemindji, Quebec (Cree for "red ochre mountain"), a Cree community on Paint Hills Bay, and northeast of Solomons Temple Islands.

In 1950, Thomas Henry Manning studied high tide and driftwood strand lines on Paint Hills Islands.
