= Austin Rocks =

- Location within Antarctica

Geography
- Location: Antarctica
- Coordinates: 63°26′S 61°4′W

Administration
- Administered under the Antarctic Treaty System

Demographics
- Population: Uninhabited

The Austin Rocks are a group of rocks which extend about 6 kilometres (3 nmi) in a northeast–southwest, lying in Bransfield Strait 24 kilometres (13 nmi) northwest of Trinity Island. Charted by a British expedition, 1828–31, under Commander Henry Foster, Royal Navy, they were named by him for Lieutenant Horatio T. Austin, Royal Navy, an officer of the expedition.
