= Rurima Island =

Island in New Zealand

Rurima (Māori)
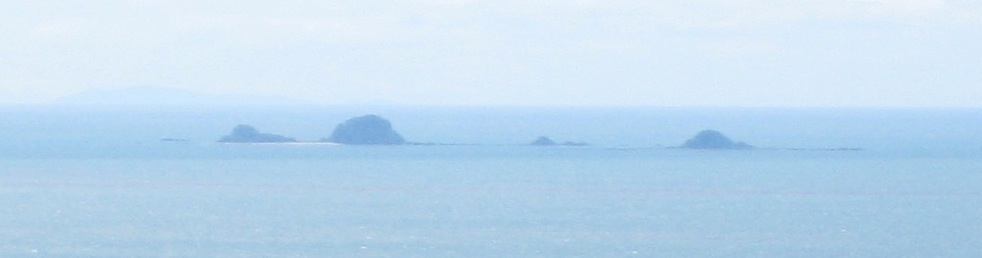
- Rurima Rocks, viewed from above Whakatane
- Interactive map of Rurima Island

Geography
- Location: Bay of Plenty
- Coordinates: 37°49′52.352335″S 176°52′18.92″E
- Archipelago: Rurima Rocks
- Length: 0.5 km (0.31 mi)

Administration
- New Zealand

Demographics
- Population: 0

Rurima Island is a small island in the Bay of Plenty, off New Zealand's North Island. The island is the largest of the Rurima Rocks, with the smaller Moutoki and Tokata Islands lying about 1 km (0.62 mi) east and west respectively.

Located approximately 9 km (5.6 mi) west of Moutohora Island and 10 km (6.2 mi) northwest from the mouth of the Rangitaiki River, the Rurima Rocks are an uninhabited nature reserve owned by the Ngāti Awa iwi. Kiore (Polynesian Rat) were eradicated in the 1980s, and Moutoki Island has long been an outpost for tuatara. The closest settlement is Thornton, about 1 km (0.62 mi) upstream from the mouth of the Rangitaiki.

Rurima Island is about 500 m (550 yd) long, with two bays and sandy beaches on the northwest side. A wide shallow reef, almost a lagoon, stretches north from the pohutukawa-covered island. Snorkelling, diving and kayaking are popular activities here. The wreck of the SS Tasman, holed on the southwest reef in 1921, lies nearby. There is some geothermal activity on and near the islands.

== See also ==
- New Zealand outlying islands
- List of islands of New Zealand
- List of islands
- Desert island
