= Plover Islands =

Island group in Nunavut, Canada

- Location within Nunavut Location within Canada

Geography
- Location: Northern Canada
- Coordinates: 60°17′N 69°34′W
- Archipelago: Arctic Archipelago; Ungava Bay Archipelago
- Total islands: 100 (Plover Islands and Payne Islands combined)
- Area: 1,250 km^{2} (480 sq mi) (Plover Islands and Payne Islands combined)

Administration
- Canada
- Nunavut: Nunavut
- Region: Qikiqtaaluk

Demographics
- Population: Uninhabited

The uninhabited Plover Islands are an archipelago, members of the Arctic Archipelago and the Ungava Bay Archipelago, in the Qikiqtaaluk Region of Nunavut, Canada. They are located in western Ungava Bay, just northeast of the Arnaud River and the community of Kangirsuk on Quebec's Ungava Peninsula.

== Geography ==
The islands have a hard granitic gneiss and a thin layer of soil. Their perimeter measures 3 km (1.9 mi).

== Flora ==
Their habitat includes lichen, moss, sedges, and low woody shrubs.

== Fauna ==
Combined with the Payne Islands further to the south, the Plovers are a Canadian Important Bird Area (#NU027). Notable bird species include the common eider and colonial waterbirds/seabirds.

The Plover Islands are a part of the Ungava Bay Archipelagoes, a Key Migratory Terrestrial Bird Site (NU Site 51).
