= Governor Islands (Western Australia) =

Island in Western Australia

The Governor Islands (13°56′36″S 126°41′58″E) are located off the Kimberley coast of Western Australia.

Islands in the group include:

- East Governor Island 13°56′45″S 126°42′15″E
- West Governor Island 13°56′45″S 126°41′08″E
