= Öregrund archipelago =

Group of islands on Sweden's coast

Coordinates: 60°21′N 18°28′E

The Öregrund archipelago (Swedish: Öregrunds skärgård) is the archipelago of Uppsala County in Sweden, located off the coast of Öregrund. It is located in the Baltic Sea and consists of 9,722 islands. The Öregrund archipelago is connected to the Stockholm archipelago in the south.
