= Governor Islands (South Orkney Islands) =

Location of the Governor Islands in the South Orkney Islands.

The Governor Islands in the South Atlantic (60°30′S 45°56′W) are a group of islands and rocks 0.5 nautical miles (1 km) north of Penguin Point, the northwestern extremity of Coronation Island, in the South Orkney Islands. They were discovered by Captain George Powell and Captain Nathaniel Palmer during their joint cruise in December 1821. The name appears on a chart based upon a running survey of the South Orkney Islands in 1912–13 by Petter Sorlle, a Norwegian whaling captain.

== See also ==
- List of antarctic and sub-antarctic islands
