= Småland archipelago =

Archipelago in Sweden

Coordinates: 57°30′N 16°45′E

The Småland archipelago (Swedish: Smålands skärgård) is an archipelago in Småland, Sweden, and one of the largest archipelagos in the world.

Some of the islands are populated, such as Hasselö, while others form the Misterhults skärgård nature reserve. A ferry service operates in the archipelago between May and September.
