= Östergötland archipelago =

Group of archipelagoes in Sweden

Coordinates: 58.24956°N 16.96463°E

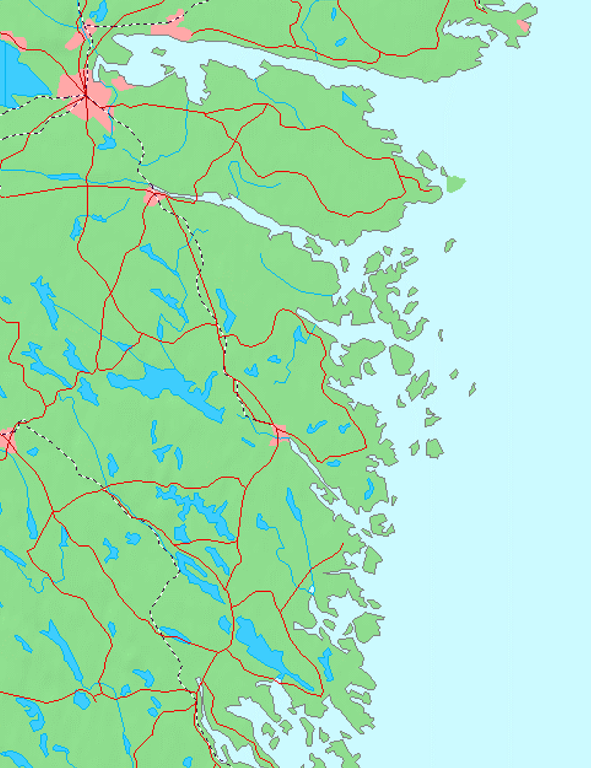
Map of Östergötland archipelago

The Östergötland archipelago is the collective name of three archipelagoes located to the east of the shore of Östergötland, Sweden, spanning three municipalities. It consists of 8,888 islands. It measures more than 60 kilometres (37 miles) from north to south and five kilometres (3.1 mi) west to east. The archipelago's northern end adjoins the bay of Bråviken and is centered on Arkösund, off the Vikbolandet peninsula and forms part of Norrköping Municipality. The central part is called Sankt Anna's archipelago and is part of Söderköping Municipality. The southernmost part is the Gryt archipelago in Valdemarsvik Municipality, and adjoins the Tjust archipelago in Småland.

== Communications ==
The three municipalities run the tour boat operation "Skärgårdslinjen" in the summer months, with regular scheduled boat travels along the coast. The county's Östgötatrafiken is responsible for the landbound mass transit in the area.
