= Martin Islands =

Island group in Nunavut, Canada

- Location within Nunavut Location within Canada

Geography
- Location: Gulf of Boothia
- Coordinates: 70°14′N 91°30′W
- Archipelago: Arctic Archipelago

Administration
- Canada
- Territory: Nunavut
- Region: Kitikmeot

Demographics
- Population: Uninhabited

The Martin Islands are part of the Arctic Archipelago in the territory of Nunavut. They are located in western Gulf of Boothia near the Boothia Peninsula.
