= Dinea Island =

Island of the South Shetland Islands

- Location of Greenwich Island in the South Shetland Islands

- Location within Antarctic Peninsula Location within Antarctica

Geography
- Location: Antarctica
- Coordinates: 62°26′40″S 59°55′09″W
- Archipelago: South Shetland Islands

Administration
- Antarctica
- Administered under the Antarctic Treaty System

Demographics
- Population: 0

Dinea Island (Bulgarian: остров Динея, romanized: ostrov Dinea, IPA: [ˈɔstrov dinɛjɐ]) is the flat rocky island off the north coast of Greenwich Island in the South Shetland Islands extending 290 m in north-northwest to south-southeast direction and 130 m wide. The area was visited by early 19th century sealers.

The island is named after the ancient Roman fortress of Dinea in Northeastern Bulgaria.

== Location ==
Dinea Island is located at 62°26′40″S 59°55′09″W, which is 1.35 km west-northwest of Aprilov Point, 840 m east-northeast of Miletich Point, 880 m east of Kabile Island and 2 km southwest of Ongley Island. Bulgarian mapping in 2009.

== Maps ==
- L.L. Ivanov. Antarctica: Livingston Island and Greenwich, Robert, Snow and Smith Islands. Scale 1:120000 topographic map. Troyan: Manfred Wörner Foundation, 2009. ISBN 978-954-92032-6-4 (Second edition 2010, ISBN 978-954-92032-9-5)
- Antarctic Digital Database (ADD). Scale 1:250000 topographic map of Antarctica. Scientific Committee on Antarctic Research (SCAR). Since 1993, regularly upgraded and updated.
