= Telerig Nunatak =

Rocky peak in the South Shetland Islands, Antarctica

Location of Greenwich Island in the South Shetland Islands.

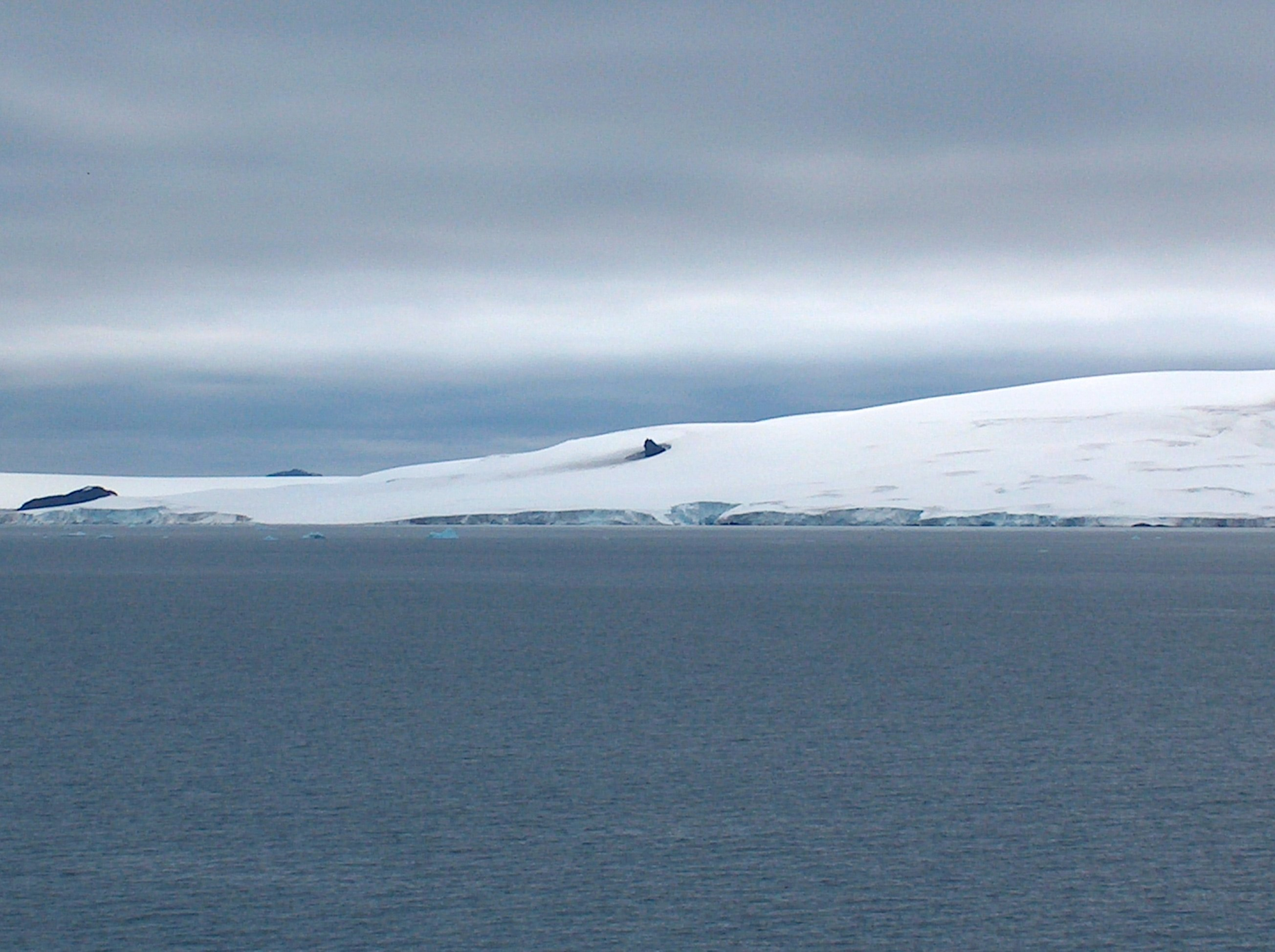
Telerig Nunatak from Half Moon Island.

Topographic map of Livingston Island, Greenwich, Robert, Snow and Smith Islands.

Telerig Nunatak (Nunatak Telerig \'nu-na-tak te-le-'rig\) is a rocky peak of elevation 170 m projecting from the ice cap of Greenwich Island in the South Shetland Islands, Antarctica in the southwest extremity of Dryanovo Heights.

The feature is named after the Bulgarian ruler Khan Telerig, 768-777 AD.

== Location ==
The nunatak is located at 62°29′35″S 59°55′33″W which is 2.07 km northwest of Yovkov Point, 1.9 km west-southwest of Lloyd Hill, 1.67 km south-southeast of Panagyurishte Nunatak and 1.6 km east-southeast of Kerseblept Nunatak (Bulgarian topographic survey Tangra 2004/05 and mapping in 2009).

== Maps ==
- L.L. Ivanov et al. Antarctica: Livingston Island and Greenwich Island, South Shetland Islands. Scale 1:100000 topographic map. Sofia: Antarctic Place-names Commission of Bulgaria, 2005.
- L.L. Ivanov. Antarctica: Livingston Island and Greenwich, Robert, Snow and Smith Islands. Scale 1:120000 topographic map. Troyan: Manfred Wörner Foundation, 2009. ISBN 978-954-92032-6-4
