= Haskovo Cove =

Cove in the South Shetland Islands, Antarctica

Location of Greenwich Island in the South Shetland Islands.

Topographic map of Livingston Island, Greenwich, Robert, Snow and Smith Islands.

Haskovo Cove (Zaliv Haskovo \'za-liv 'ha-sko-vo\) is a 2.1 km wide cove indenting for 1 km the northern coast of Greenwich Island between Aprilov Point and Miletich Point in the South Shetland Islands, Antarctica. Situated next east of Crutch Peaks, southwest of Ongley Island and northwest of Sevtopolis Peak. Shape enhanced as a result of Teteven Glacier’s retreat in the late 20th and early 21st century. The cove is named after the city of Haskovo in Southeastern Bulgaria.

== Location ==
The cove is located at 62°27′03″S 59°54′20″W (British mapping in 1968, and Bulgarian mapping in 2005 and 2009).

== Maps ==
- L.L. Ivanov et al. Antarctica: Livingston Island and Greenwich Island, South Shetland Islands. Scale 1:100000 topographic map. Sofia: Antarctic Place-names Commission of Bulgaria, 2005.
- L.L. Ivanov. Antarctica: Livingston Island and Greenwich, Robert, Snow and Smith Islands. Scale 1:120000 topographic map. Troyan: Manfred Wörner Foundation, 2009.
