= Skaptopara Cove =

Cove in the South Shetland Islands, Antarctica

Location of Greenwich Island in the South Shetland Islands

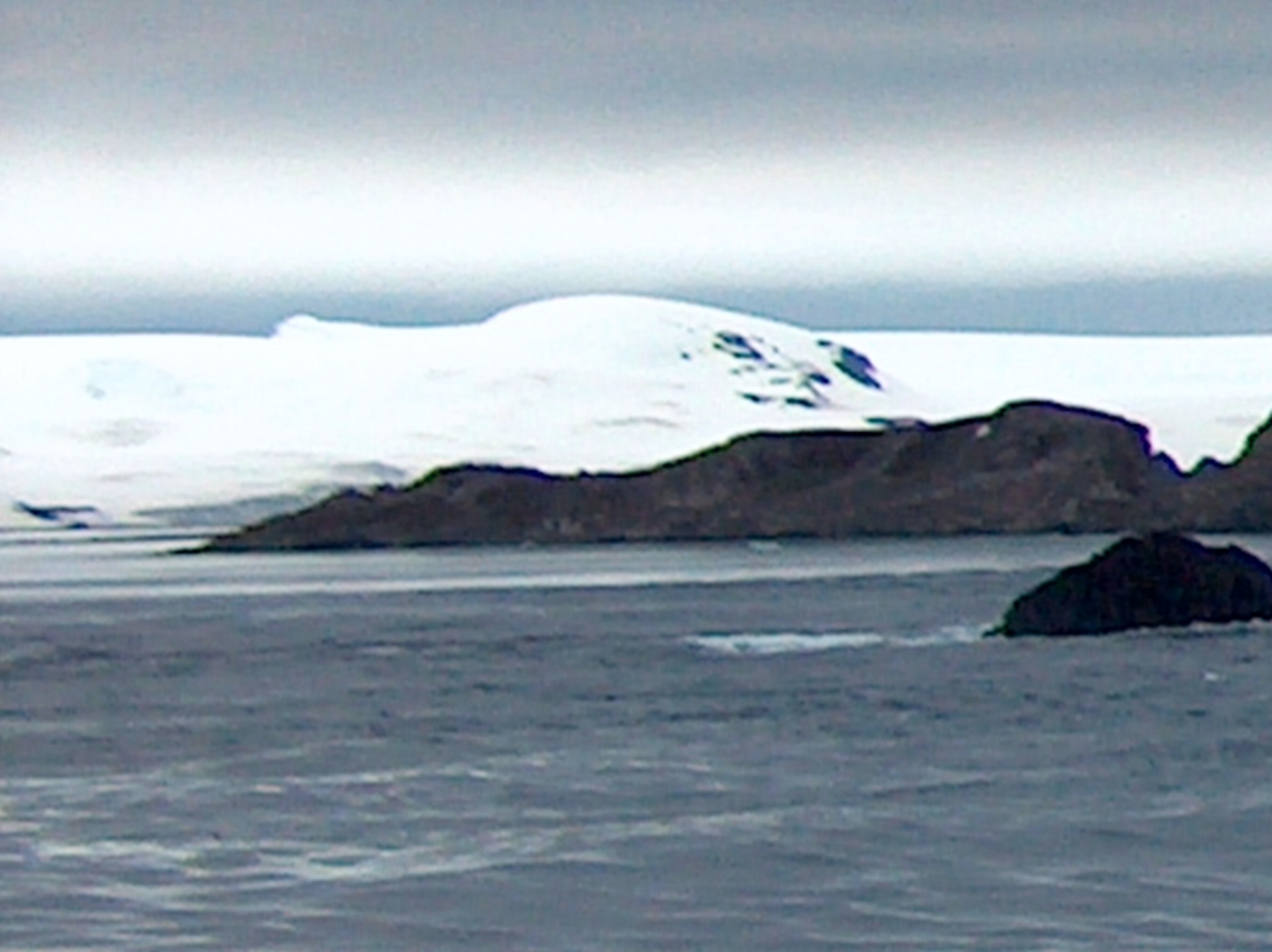
Skaptopara Cove in the background, seen from Aitcho Islands

Topographic map of Livingston Island

Skaptopara Cove (Bulgarian: залив Скаптопара, romanized: zaliv Skaptopara, IPA: [ˈzalif skɐptoˈparɐ]) is a 2 km wide cove indenting for 900 m the north coast of Greenwich Island in the South Shetland Islands, Antarctica east of Aprilov Point and west of Terimer Point. Situated northeast of Sevtopolis Peak, southeast of Ongley Island and northwest of Mount Plymouth. The shape of the cove was enhanced as a result of Teteven Glacier’s retreat in the late 20th and early 21st century.

The cove is named after the ancient Thracian town of Skaptopara, ancestor of the present Bulgarian city of Blagoevgrad.

== Location ==
The cove is centred at 62°26′55″S 59°50′58″W (British mapping in 1968, Chilean in 1971, and Bulgarian in 2005, 2009 and 2017).

== Maps ==
- L.L. Ivanov et al. Antarctica: Livingston Island and Greenwich Island, South Shetland Islands. Scale 1:100000 topographic map. Sofia: Antarctic Place-names Commission of Bulgaria, 2005.
- L.L. Ivanov. Antarctica: Livingston Island and Greenwich, Robert, Snow and Smith Islands. Scale 1:120000 topographic map. Troyan: Manfred Wörner Foundation, 2009. ISBN 978-954-92032-6-4
- L.L. Ivanov. Antarctica: Livingston Island and Smith Island. Scale 1:100000 topographic map. Manfred Wörner Foundation, 2017. ISBN 978-619-90008-3-0
