= Proteus Lake =

Antarctic lake

- Location within South Shetland Islands
- Location: Greenwich Island, Antarctica
- Coordinates: 62°26′36″S 59°48′24″W
- Lake type: Glacial lake
- Max. length: 300 metres (980 ft)
- Max. width: 220 metres (720 ft)
- Surface area: 3.9 hectares (9.6 acres)

Map of Livingston Island area featuring Flamingo Beach

Proteus Lake (Bulgarian: езеро Протей, romanized: ezero Protey, IPA: [ˈɛzɛro proˈtɛj]) is the roughly pentagonal lake extending 300 m in west–east direction and 220 m in south–north direction in the central part of Flamingo Beach on the north coast of Greenwich Island in the South Shetland Islands, Antarctica. It has a surface area of 3.9 ha and is separated from the waters of Orión Passage by a 20 to 35 m wide strip of land. The area was visited by early 19th century sealers.

The feature is named after the water deity Proteus in Greek mythology.

== Location ==
Proteus Lake is situated at the base of Brusen Point and centred at 62°26′36″S 59°48′24″W, which is 1.42 km east-northeast of Terimer Point and 900 m west-southwest of Agüedo Point. Bulgarian mapping of the area in 2009 and 2017.

== Maps ==
- L. Ivanov. Antarctica: Livingston Island and Greenwich, Robert, Snow and Smith Islands. Scale 1:120000 topographic map. Troyan: Manfred Wörner Foundation, 2009. ISBN 978-954-92032-6-4
- L. Ivanov. Antarctica: Livingston Island and Smith Island. Scale 1:100000 topographic map. Manfred Wörner Foundation, 2017. ISBN 978-619-90008-3-0
- Antarctic Digital Database (ADD). Scale 1:250000 topographic map of Antarctica. Scientific Committee on Antarctic Research (SCAR). Since 1993, regularly upgraded and updated

== See also ==
- Antarctic lakes
