= Flamingo Beach =

Beach in Antarctica

Location of Greenwich Island in the South Shetland Islands

Topographic map of Livingston Island area featuring Flamingo Beach

Flamingo Beach (Bulgarian: бряг Фламинго, romanized: bryag Flamingo, IPA: [ˈbrʲak fɫɐˈmiŋɡo]) is the beach on Drake Passage extending 2.6 km in east-west direction and 600 m wide, situated on the north coast of Greenwich Island in the South Shetland Islands, Antarctica. Snow-free in summer, it is bounded by Terimer Point to the west, Orión Passage to the north, Agüedo Point to the east, Quito Glacier to the southeast and Teteven Glacier to the southwest. Proteus Lake is situated in the central part of the beach and Nereid Lake lies near its eastern end. The area was visited by early 19th century sealers.

The beach is “named after the ocean fishing trawler Flamingo of the Bulgarian company Ocean Fisheries – Burgas whose ships operated in the waters of South Georgia, Kerguelen, the South Orkney Islands, South Shetland Islands and Antarctic Peninsula from 1970 to the early 1990s. The Bulgarian fishermen, along with those of the Soviet Union, Poland and East Germany are the pioneers of modern Antarctic fishing industry.”

== Location ==
Flamingo Beach is centred at 62°26′40″S 59°48′30″W. Bulgarian mapping in 2005 and 2009.

== Maps ==
- L.L. Ivanov et al. Antarctica: Livingston Island and Greenwich Island, South Shetland Islands. Scale 1:100000 topographic map. Sofia: Antarctic Place-names Commission of Bulgaria, 2005.
- L.L. Ivanov. Antarctica: Livingston Island and Smith Island. Scale 1:100000 topographic map. Manfred Wörner Foundation, 2017; updated 2018.
- Antarctic Digital Database (ADD). Scale 1:250000 topographic map of Antarctica. Scientific Committee on Antarctic Research (SCAR). Since 1993, regularly upgraded and updated.
