= Brusen Point =

Rocky island in Antarctica

Location of Greenwich Island in the South Shetland Islands.

Topographic map of Livingston Island, Greenwich, Robert, Snow and Smith Islands.

Brusen Point (Bulgarian: нос Брусен, ‘Nos Brusen’ \'nos 'bru-sen\) is the narrow rocky point projecting 200 m in north-northwest direction and forming the north extremity of Greenwich Island in the South Shetland Islands, Antarctica. Nereid Lake is situated 800 m east-southeast of the point, and Proteus Lake lies at its base.

The point is named after the settlements of Brusen in Northwestern and Western Bulgaria.

== Location ==
Brusen Point is located at 62°26′27″S 59°48′32″W, which is 990 m west of Agüedo Point and 4.55 km east of Aprilov Point on Greenwich Island, and 1.02 km southwest of Dee Island. British mapping in 1968, Chilean in 1971, Argentine in 1980, and Bulgarian in 2005 and 2009.

== Maps ==
- L.L. Ivanov et al. Antarctica: Livingston Island and Greenwich Island, South Shetland Islands. Scale 1:100000 topographic map. Sofia: Antarctic Place-names Commission of Bulgaria, 2005.
- L.L. Ivanov. Antarctica: Livingston Island and Greenwich, Robert, Snow and Smith Islands. Scale 1:120000 topographic map. Troyan: Manfred Wörner Foundation, 2009. ISBN 978-954-92032-6-4 (Updated second edition 2010. ISBN 978-954-92032-9-5)
