= Panagyurishte Nunatak =

Location of Greenwich Island in the South Shetland Islands.

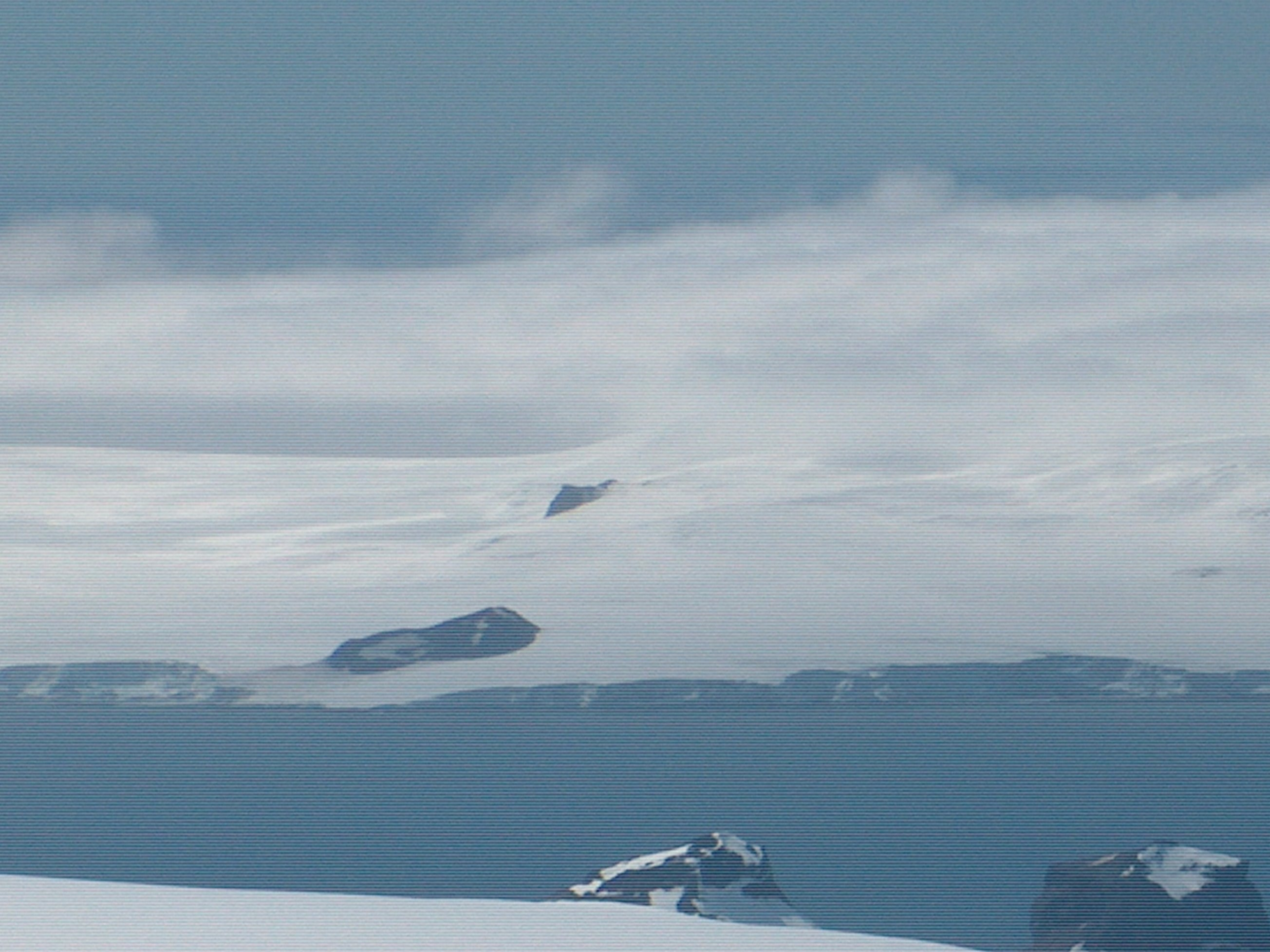
Panagyurishte Nunatak (on the opposite coast of McFarlane Strait, in the background) from Melnik Peak, Livingston Island.

Topographic map of Livingston Island, Greenwich, Robert, Snow and Smith Islands.

Panagyurishte Nunatak (Nunatak Panagyurishte \'nu-na-tak pa-na-'gyu-ri-shte\) is a rocky peak of elevation 150 m projecting from Yakoruda Glacier, Greenwich Island in the South Shetland Islands, Antarctica. The peak is named after the town of Panagyurishte in central Bulgaria.

== Location ==
Panagyurishte Nunatak is located at 62°28′44″S 59°56′12″W, which is 2.8 km south of Crutch Peaks, 3.4 km west-southwest of Sevtopolis Peak, and 1.38 km northeast of Kerseblept Nunatak (Bulgarian topographic survey Tangra 2004/05 and mapping in 2009).

== Maps ==
- L.L. Ivanov et al. Antarctica: Livingston Island and Greenwich Island, South Shetland Islands. Scale 1:100000 topographic map. Sofia: Antarctic Place-names Commission of Bulgaria, 2005.
- L.L. Ivanov. Antarctica: Livingston Island and Greenwich, Robert, Snow and Smith Islands. Scale 1:120000 topographic map. Troyan: Manfred Wörner Foundation, 2009. ISBN 978-954-92032-6-4
