= Nereid Lake =

Antarctic lake

- Location within South Shetland Islands
- Location: Greenwich Island, Antarctica
- Coordinates: 62°26′37″S 59°47′41″W
- Lake type: Glacial lake
- Max. length: 450 metres (1,480 ft)
- Max. width: 90 metres (300 ft)
- Surface area: 3.8 hectares (9.4 acres)

Topographic map of Livingston Island area featuring Nereid Lake

Nereid Lake (Bulgarian: езеро Нереида, romanized: ezero Nereida, IPA: [ˈɛzɛro nɛrɛˈidɐ]) is the trapezoidal lake 450 m long in west-southwest to east-northeast direction and 90 m wide in the eastern part of Flamingo Beach on the north coast of Greenwich Island in the South Shetland Islands, Antarctica. It has a surface area of 3.8 ha and is separated from the waters of Orión Passage by a 20 to 40 m wide strip of land. The area was visited by early 19th century sealers.

The feature is named after the Nereids, sea nymphs of Greek mythology.

== Location ==
Nereid Lake is situated just west of Agüedo Point and centred at 62°26′37″S 59°47′41″W, which is 800 m east-southeast of Brusen Point. Bulgarian mapping in 2009 and 2017.

== Maps ==
- L. Ivanov. Antarctica: Livingston Island and Greenwich, Robert, Snow and Smith Islands. Scale 1:120000 topographic map. Troyan: Manfred Wörner Foundation, 2009. ISBN 978-954-92032-6-4
- L. Ivanov. Antarctica: Livingston Island and Smith Island. Scale 1:100000 topographic map. Manfred Wörner Foundation, 2017. ISBN 978-619-90008-3-0
- Antarctic Digital Database (ADD). Scale 1:250000 topographic map of Antarctica. Scientific Committee on Antarctic Research (SCAR). Since 1993, regularly upgraded and updated

== See also ==
- Antarctic lakes
