= Altsek Nunatak =

Location of Greenwich Island in the South Shetland Islands.

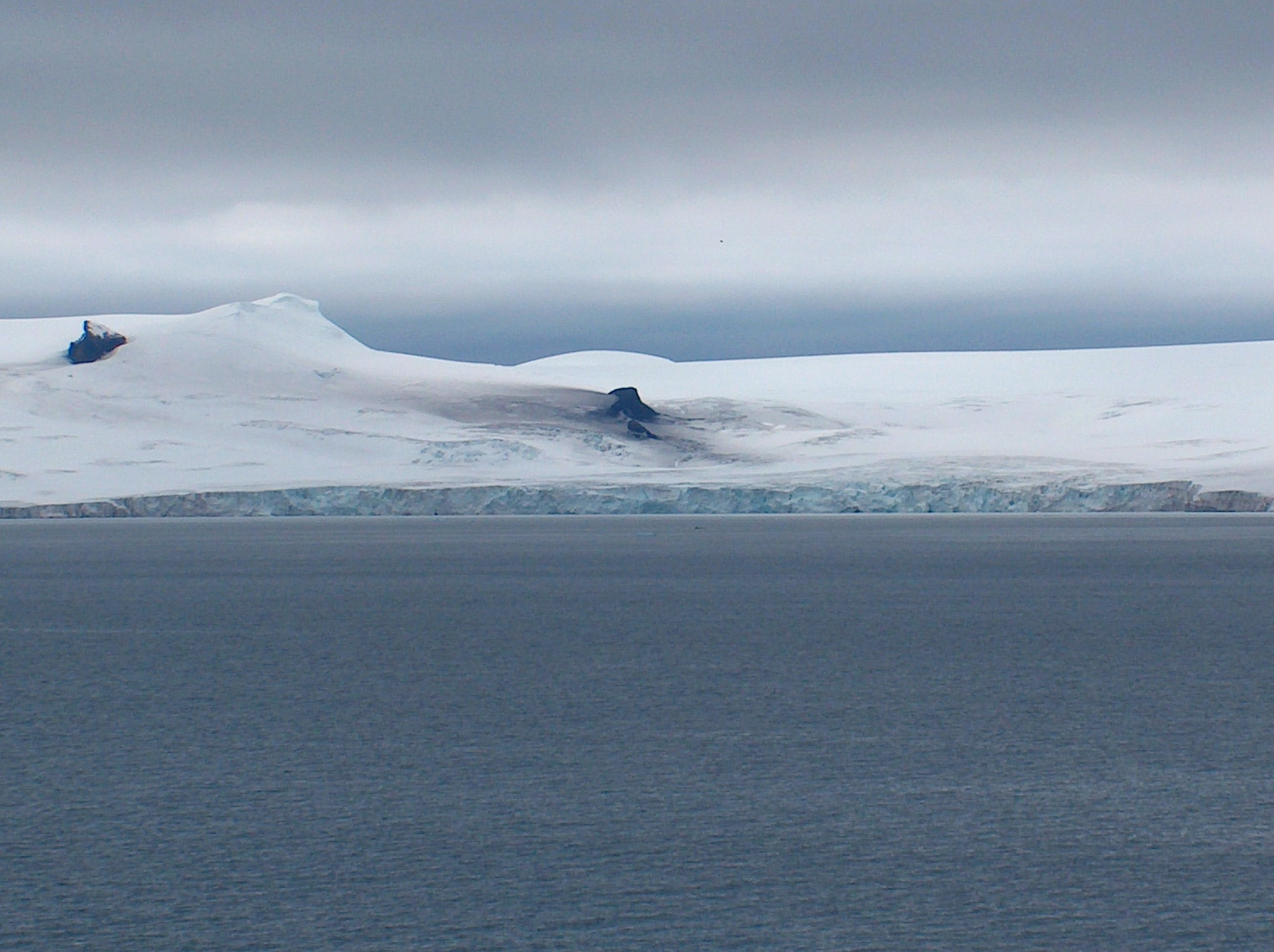
Altsek Nunatak from Half Moon Island, with Lloyd Hill and Kotrag Nunatak on the left.

Topographic map of Livingston Island, Greenwich, Robert, Snow and Smith Islands.

Altsek Nunatak (Nunatak Altsek \'nu-na-tak al-'tsek\) is a 170-metre-high (560 ft) rocky hill projecting from the Murgash Glacier in Dryanovo Heights on Greenwich Island, Antarctica. The peak is named after Khan Altsek, whose Bulgars settled in Italy in the 7th century AD.

== Location ==
The peak is located at 62°29′41.6″S 59°52′43″W which is 1.96 km northeast of Yovkov Point, 740 m southeast of Lloyd Hill, 970 m east of Kotrag Nunatak, 1.6 km west by north of Tile Ridge and 2.5 km north-northwest of Kaspichan Point.

== See also ==
- Dryanovo Heights

== Maps ==
- L.L. Ivanov et al. Antarctica: Livingston Island and Greenwich Island, South Shetland Islands. Scale 1:100000 topographic map. Sofia: Antarctic Place-names Commission of Bulgaria, 2005.
- L.L. Ivanov. Antarctica: Livingston Island and Greenwich, Robert, Snow and Smith Islands. Scale 1:120000 topographic map. Troyan: Manfred Wörner Foundation, 2009.
