= Greaves Peak =

Peak on Greenwich Island, Antarctica

Location of Greenwich Island in the South Shetland Islands.

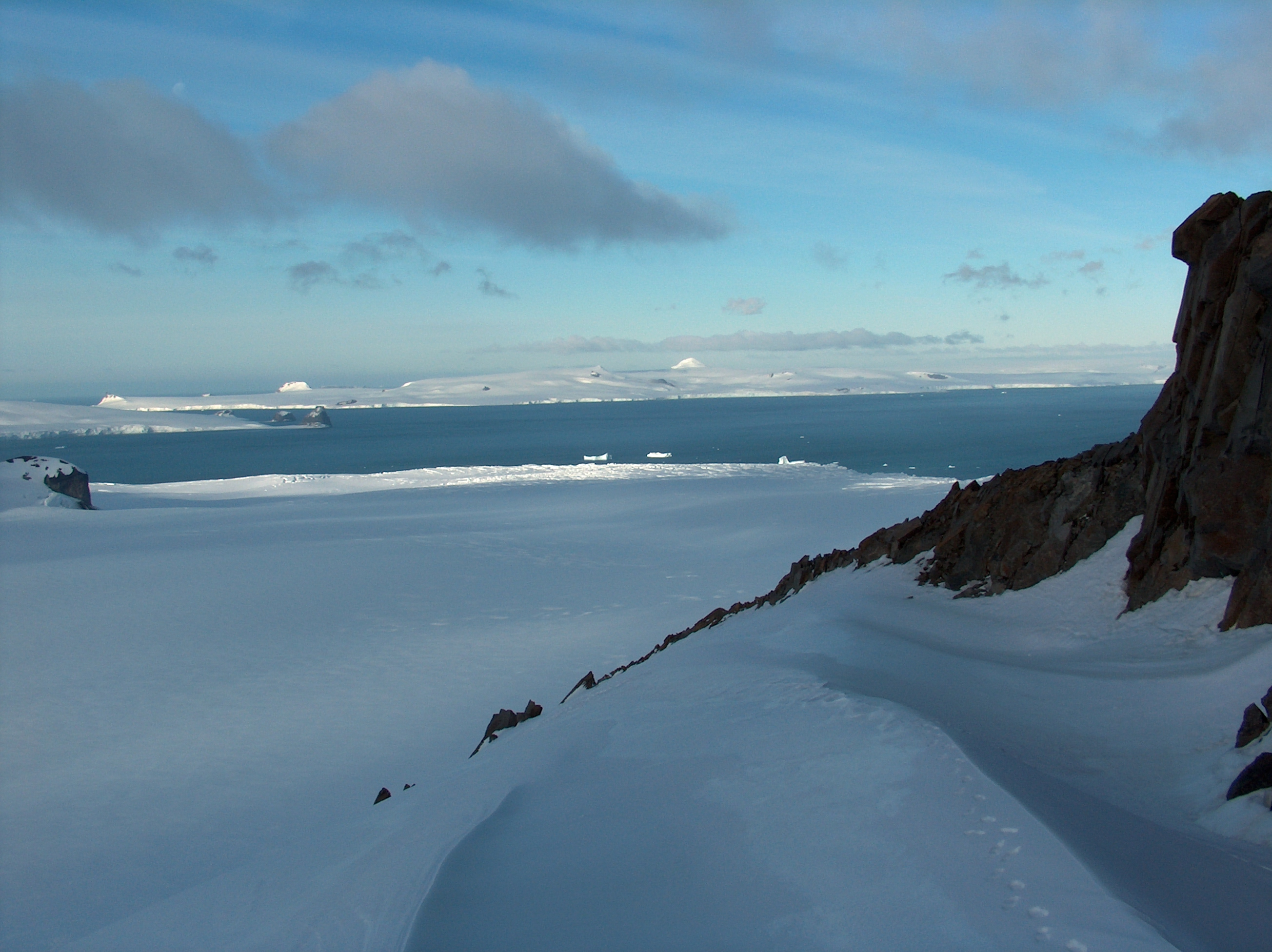
Greaves Peak (in the left background) from near Ravda Peak, Livingston Island, with McFarlane Strait, Inott Point and Edinburgh Hill in the middle ground.

Greaves Peak is a conspicuous sharp, dark, double-pointed rocky peak rising to 240 m in the northwest of Greenwich Island in the South Shetland Islands, Antarctica. The peak surmounts Yakoruda Glacier to the southeast, Archar Peninsula to the west and Razlog Cove to the northwest.

The feature is named after Captain Alexander Benjamin Greaves, Master of the British sealing ship Brussa which visited the South Shetlands in 1821–22.

== Location ==
The peak is located at 62°27′15″S 59°59′21.9″W which is 2.11 km east-southeast of Duff Point, 1.49 km west of Hrabar Nunatak, 2.67 km west of Crutch Peaks and 4.16 km west-northwest of Kerseblept Nunatak (British mapping in 1935, 1942 and 1968, Argentine in 1948, French in 1954, Chilean in 1961, and Bulgarian in 2005 and 2009).

== See also ==
- Greenwich Island

== Maps ==
- L.L. Ivanov et al. Antarctica: Livingston Island and Greenwich Island, South Shetland Islands. Scale 1:100000 topographic map. Sofia: Antarctic Place-names Commission of Bulgaria, 2005.
- L.L. Ivanov. Antarctica: Livingston Island and Greenwich, Robert, Snow and Smith Islands. Scale 1:120000 topographic map. Troyan: Manfred Wörner Foundation, 2009. ISBN 978-954-92032-6-4
