= Yakoruda Glacier =

Glacier in Antarctica

- Location of Greenwich Island in the South Shetland Islands

- Location within South Shetland Islands Location within Antarctica
- Location: Greenwich Island; South Shetland Islands
- Coordinates: 62°28′30″S 59°56′37″W
- Length: 2 nmi (4 km; 2 mi)
- Width: 1 nmi (2 km; 1 mi)
- Thickness: unknown
- Terminus: Berende Cove
- Status: unknown

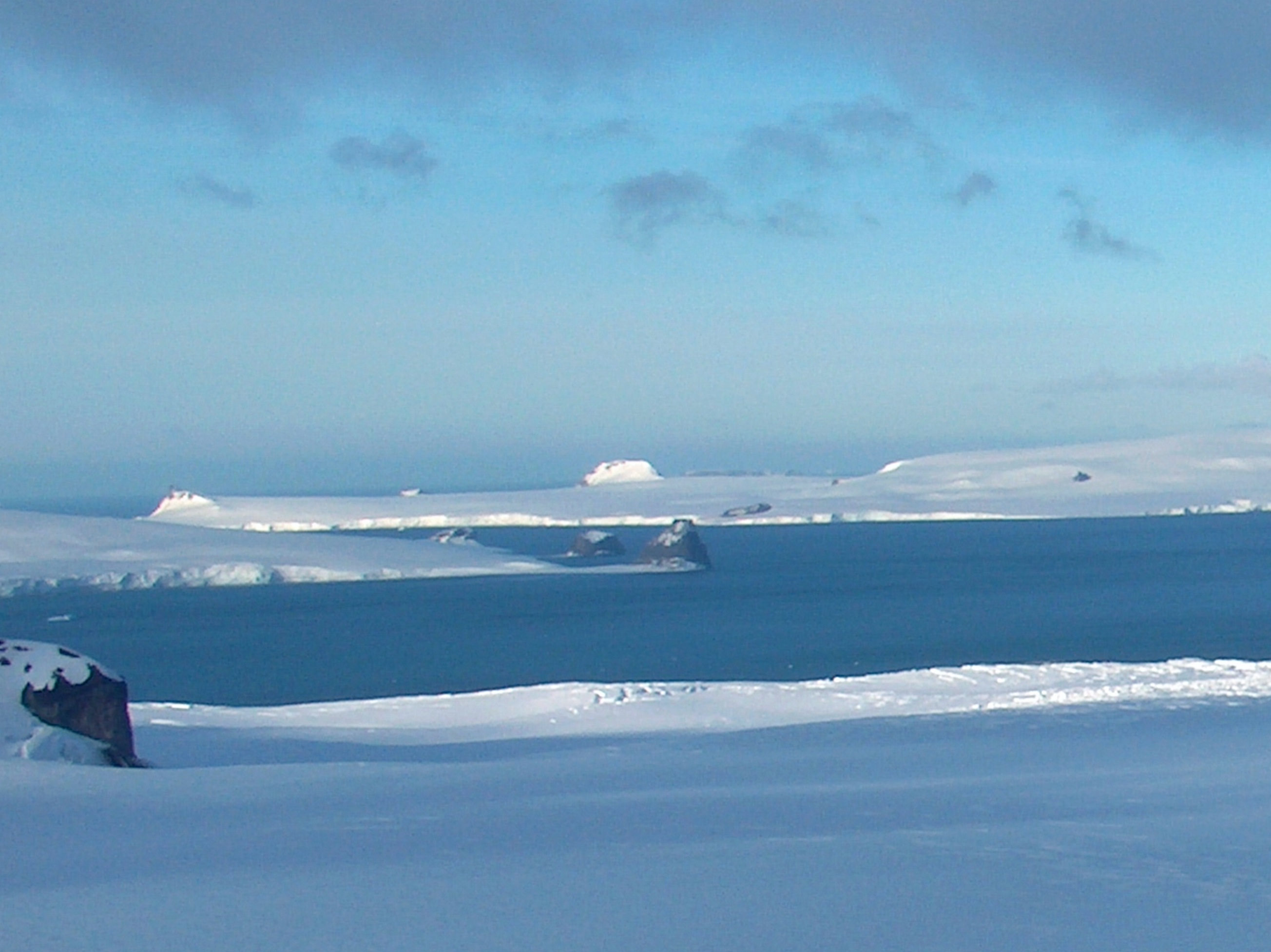
Yakoruda Glacier (in the background) from Ravda Peak area, Livingston Island, with Huron Glacier and McFarlane Strait in the foreground.

Topographic map of Livingston Island, Greenwich, Robert, Snow and Smith Islands.

Yakoruda Glacier (Bulgarian: ледник Якоруда, romanized: lednik Yakoruda, IPA: [ˈlɛdnik jakoˈrudɐ]) is a glacier on the west slopes of Dryanovo Heights, Greenwich Island in the South Shetland Islands, Antarctica situated west of Teteven Glacier and northwest of Murgash Glacier. It extends 3.5 km in north-south direction and 2.5 km in east-west direction, is bounded by Greaves Peak, Hrabar Nunatak and Crutch Peaks to the north, Lloyd Hill to the east and Kerseblept Nunatak to the south, and drains westwards into Berende Cove, McFarlane Strait.

The feature is named after the town of Yakoruda in southwestern Bulgaria.

== Location ==
Yakoruda Glacier is centred at 62°28′30″S 59°56′37″W (Bulgarian survey Tangra 2004/05 and mapping in 2005 and 2009).

== See also ==
- List of glaciers in the Antarctic
- Glaciology

== Maps ==
- L.L. Ivanov et al. Antarctica: Livingston Island and Greenwich Island, South Shetland Islands. Scale 1:100000 topographic map. Sofia: Antarctic Place-names Commission of Bulgaria, 2005.
- L.L. Ivanov. Antarctica: Livingston Island and Greenwich, Robert, Snow and Smith Islands. Scale 1:120000 topographic map. Troyan: Manfred Wörner Foundation, 2009. ISBN 978-954-92032-6-4
