= Kotrag Nunatak =

Mountain in Antarctica

Location of Greenwich Island in the South Shetland Islands.

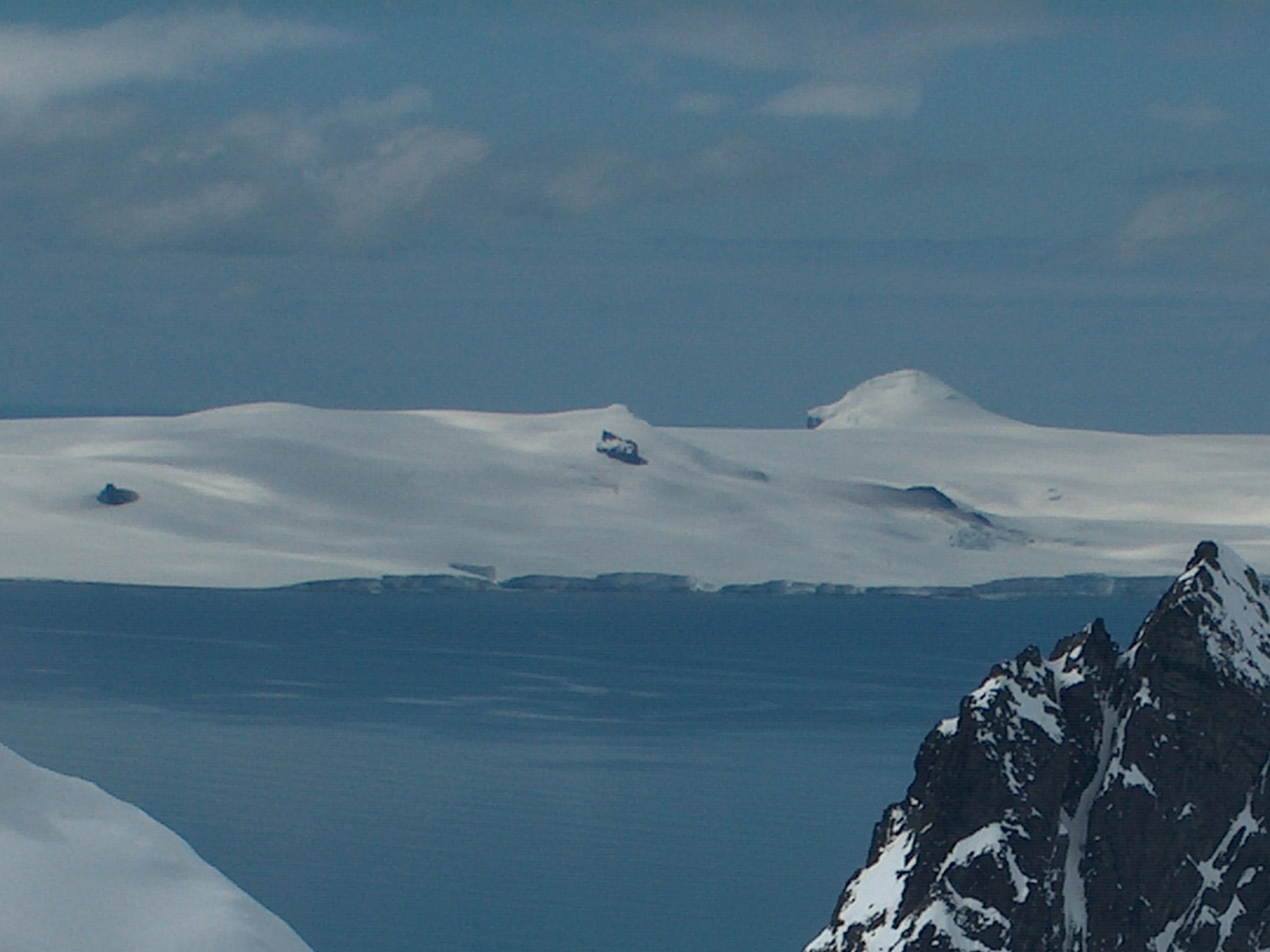
Kotrag Nunatak from Kuzman Knoll, Livingston Island.

Topographic map of Livingston Island, Greenwich, Robert, Snow and Smith Islands.

Kotrag Nunatak (Nunatak Kotrag \'nu-na-tak ko-'trag\) is a conspicuous rocky peak of elevation 290 m projecting from Murgash Glacier, Greenwich Island in the South Shetland Islands, Antarctica. It was named after Khan Kotrag, founder of the Kingdom of Volga Bulgaria in the 7th Century AD.

== Location ==
The peak is located at 62°29′37.3″S 59°53′50″W which is 540 m southwest of Lloyd Hill, 1.47 km east of Telerig Nunatak, and 970 m west of Altsek Nunatak (Bulgarian topographic survey Tangra 2004/05 and mapping in 2009).

== Maps ==
- L.L. Ivanov et al. Antarctica: Livingston Island and Greenwich Island, South Shetland Islands. Scale 1:100000 topographic map. Sofia: Antarctic Place-names Commission of Bulgaria, 2005.
- L.L. Ivanov. Antarctica: Livingston Island and Greenwich, Robert, Snow and Smith Islands. Scale 1:120000 topographic map. Troyan: Manfred Wörner Foundation, 2009.
