= Terimer Point =

Point on the north coast of Greenwich Island in Antarctica

Location of Greenwich Island in the South Shetland Islands

Topographic map featuring Terimer Point

Terimer Point (Bulgarian: нос Теример, ‘Nos Terimer’ \'nos 'te-ri-mer\) is the low, rounded and ice-free tipped east entrance point of Skaptopara Cove, forming the west extremity of Flamingo Beach on the north coast of Greenwich Island in Antarctica. It is named after the medieval settlement of Terimer in Western Bulgaria.

== Location ==
Terimer Point is located at 62°26′48″S 59°49′59″W, which is 2.36 km west-southwest of Agüedo Point, 3.25 km east of Aprilov Point, 2.87 km southeast of Ongley Island and 2.33 km southwest of Dee Island. British mapping in 1968, and Bulgarian in 2005, 2009 and 2017.

== Maps ==
- L.L. Ivanov et al. Antarctica: Livingston Island and Greenwich Island, South Shetland Islands. Scale 1:100000 topographic map. Sofia: Antarctic Place-names Commission of Bulgaria, 2005.
- L.L. Ivanov. Antarctica: Livingston Island and Greenwich, Robert, Snow and Smith Islands. Scale 1:120000 topographic map. Troyan: Manfred Wörner Foundation, 2009.
- Antarctic Digital Database (ADD). Scale 1:250000 topographic map of Antarctica. Scientific Committee on Antarctic Research (SCAR). Since 1993, regularly upgraded and updated
