= Pavlikeni Point =

Location of Greenwich Island in the South Shetland Islands.

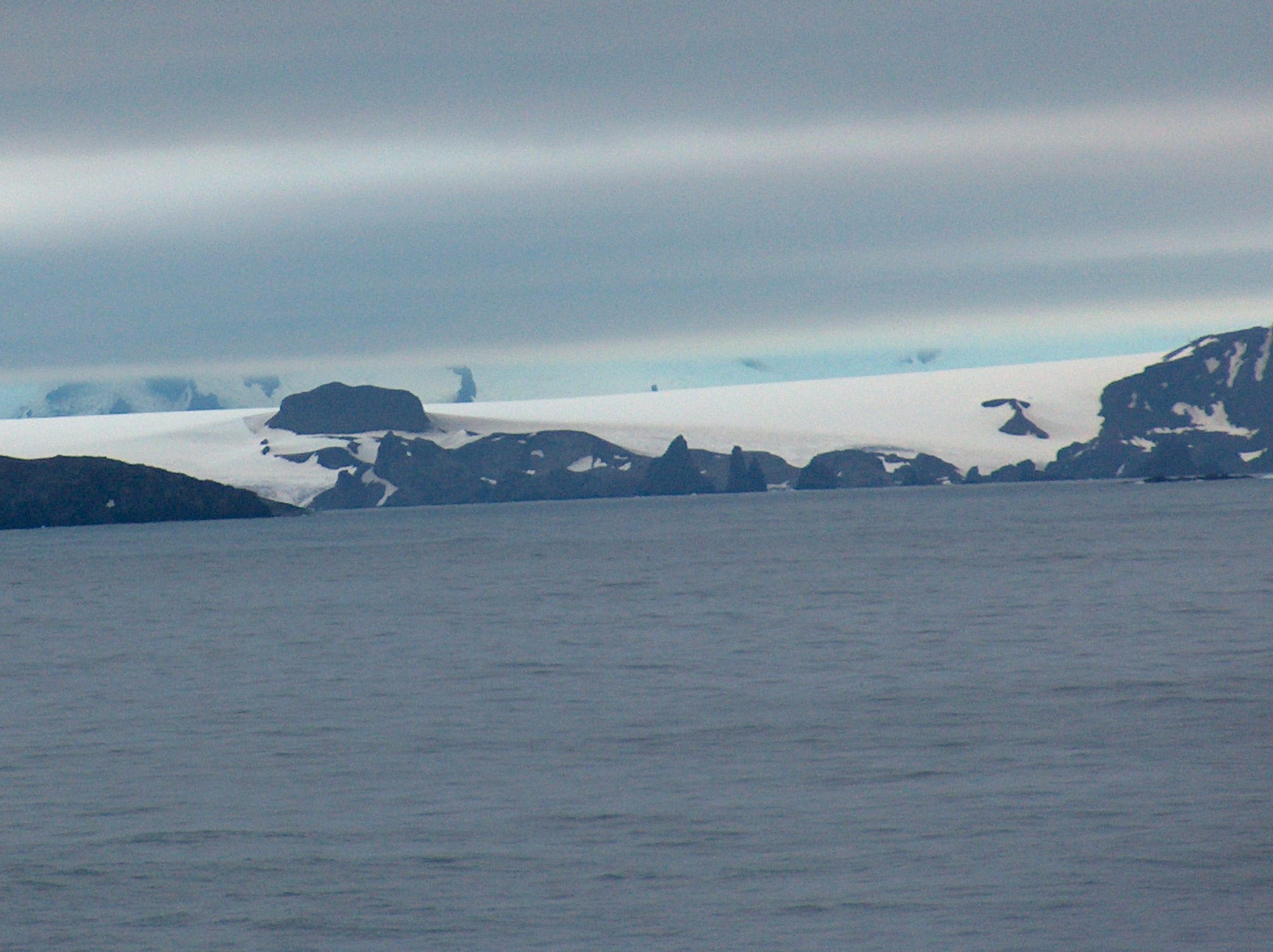
Pavlikeni Point from English Strait.

Topographic map of Livingston Island, Greenwich, Robert, Snow and Smith Islands.

Pavlikeni Point (Nos Pavlikeni \'nos pa-vli-'ke-ni\) projects 600 m from the north coast of Greenwich Island in the South Shetland Islands, Antarctica and is snow-free in summer. It is named after the Bulgarian town of Pavlikeni.

== Location ==
The point is located at 62°26′35″S 59°57′56″W, which is 3.4 km east of Duff Point, 950 m west of Kabile Island, 9.1 km west of Agüedo Point, 1.55 km west-northwest of Miletich Point and 1.13 km north of Hrabar Nunatak (Bulgarian mapping in 2009).

== Pavlikeni Point in fiction ==
Pavlikeni Point features in the recent book Pavlikeni Point: Short Stories by the Bulgarian writer Dimitar Tomov.

== Maps ==
- L.L. Ivanov. Antarctica: Livingston Island and Greenwich, Robert, Snow and Smith Islands. Scale 1:120000 topographic map. Troyan: Manfred Wörner Foundation, 2009. ISBN 978-954-92032-6-4
