= Chernorizets Hrabar =

Bulgarian monk, scholar and writer

Chernorizets Hrabar (Church Slavonic: Чрьнори́зьць Хра́бръ, Črьnorizьcь Hrabrъ) (Note: Sometimes modernized as Chernorizetz Hrabar, Chernorizets Hrabr or Crnorizec Hrabar.) was a Bulgarian monk, scholar and writer who is credited as the author of On the Letters. He worked at the Preslav Literary School in the First Bulgarian Empire at the end of the 9th and the beginning of the 10th century.

== Name and historicity ==
His appellation translates as "Hrabar, the Black Robe Wearer" (i.e., Hrabar the Monk), chernorizets being the lowest rank in the monastic hierarchy (translatable as "black robe-wearer", see čьrnъ and riza), "Hrabar" ("Hrabr") (Note: Other spellings include: Russian: Храбр (in Russian), Bulgarian: Храбър (in Bulgarian), Xrabr and Chrabr (in German and French).) supposed to be his given name. However, sometimes he is referred to as "Chernorizets the Brave", "the Brave One" or "Brave" which is the translation of Hrabar assumed to be a nickname.

The authorship of his work and his identity have been a matter of scholarly debate. His name has been theorized as a pseudonym used by some of the other famous men of letters such as Constantine, John the Exarch, Clement of Ohrid or even by Tsar Simeon I of Bulgaria himself.

== On the Letters ==
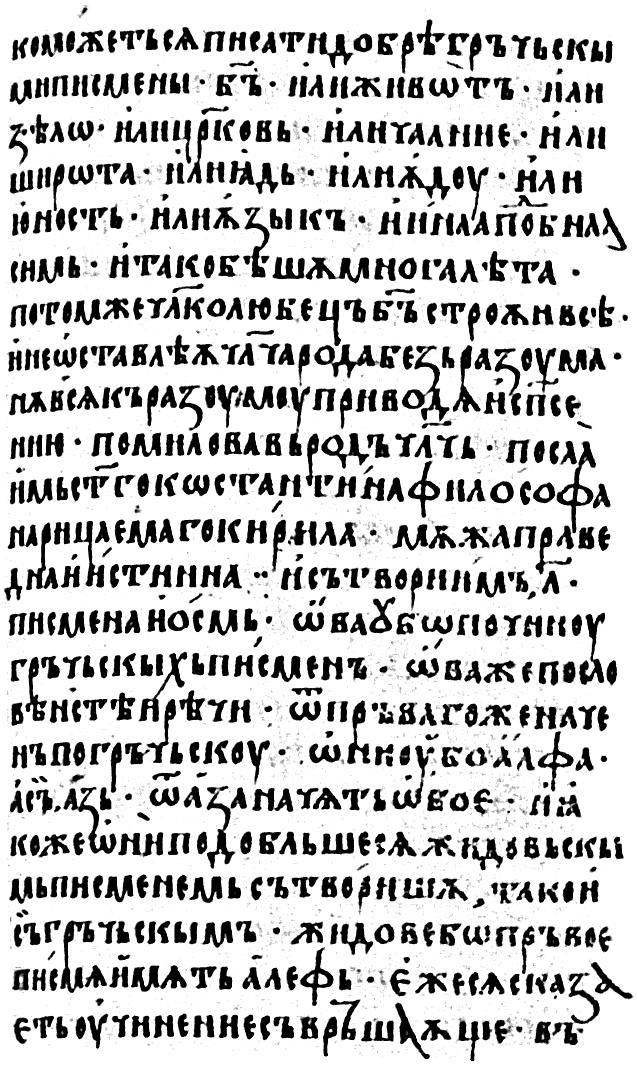
A page from the oldest (1348) copy

Chernorizets Hrabar is the credited author of only one literary work, "On the Letters" (Church Slavonic: О писмєнєхь, O pismenehь), a popular medieval treatise written in Old Church Slavonic. The work was written in the late ninth or early tenth century. It was partly based on Greek scholia and grammar treatises and expounded on the origin of the Glagolitic alphabet and Slavic Bible translation.

He also provided information critical to Slavonic paleography with his mention that the pre-Christian Slavs employed "strokes and incisions" (Church Slavonic: чръты и рѣзы, črъty i rězy), a form of writing that was, apparently, insufficient to properly reflect the spoken language. It is thought that this may have been a form of runic script but no authentic examples are known to have survived. The dominant view among scholars is that Hrabar was defending Slavonic in response to Greek criticism, while others have argued that his text was a defense of Glagolithic against Cyrillic.

=== Manuscript copies ===
The manuscript of On the Letters has been preserved in 79 copies in seven families of texts, including five contaminated manuscripts, plus four abridgements independent of the seven families. All of these families probably ultimately share a common protograph. Not one of the textual families contains an optimal text, and none of them can be established to be the source of any other. None of the text families can be shown to have dialectal features, albeit some of the individual manuscripts in the families do have them. The protograph was written in Glagolitic, and it underwent significant change or corruption in the course of its successive transcription into seven families of Cyrillic texts. Only the Cyrillic manuscripts are preserved. The hyparchetypes of all seven families give the number of the letters in the alphabet as 38, but the original Glagolitic alphabet had only 36, as attested in the acrostic of Constantine of Preslav; however, one of the abridgements instead gives the number as 37 and another gives it as 42.

The oldest surviving manuscript copy, contained in Lavrentiy's Miscellany, dates back to 1348 and was made by the monk Laurentius for Tsar Ivan Alexander of Bulgaria. The work has also been printed in Vilnius (1575–1580), Moscow (1637), Saint Petersburg (1776), Supraśl (1781). It is the earliest printed work of an early Bulgarian author, included as part of the 1578 version of Ivan Fеdorov's East Slav primer.

=== Excerpt ===
From the opening of the 1348 manuscript text: (Note: Based on Jagić's edition, with additional reference to Vondrák, Lavrov, and the original manuscript.)

Прѣжде ѹ҆бо словѣне не и҅мѣ́хѫ книгъ· (Note: Some manuscripts have писменъ (pismenъ) 'letters' instead.) нѫ чрътами и҆ рѣзами чьтѣхѫ и҆ гатаахѫ погани сѫще· кръстивше же сѧ, ри́м҆сками и҆ гръчьскыми писмены нѫждаахѫ сѧ [писати] (Note: Word omitted, present in some other manuscripts.) словѣн҆скы рѣчь безъ ѹ҆строениа. нѫ како мо́жеть сѧ писати добрѣ гръчьскыми писмены· б҃ъ. и҆ли живѡ̀тъ. и҆ли ꙃѣлѡ. и҆ли цр҃ковь. и҆ли чаание. и҆ли ширѡта. и҆ли ꙗ҅дь. и҆ли ѫ҆дѹ. и҆ли ю҆ность. и҆ли ѫ҆зыкъ. (Note: Old Church Slavonic ѧзыкъ (ęzykъ), found in some of the other manuscripts, becomes ѫзыкъ (ǫzykъ) in Middle Bulgarian.) и҆ и́наа поⷣбнаа симь. (Note: The listed words use sounds that could not be represented by Greek letters.) и҆ тако бѣшѫ многа лѣта. по том же чл҃колюбецъ б҃ъ [...] посла̀ и҆мь ст҃го Кѡстанти́на фило́софа нарицаемаго Ки́рила, мѫжа праведна и҆ и́стинна· и҆ сътвори и́мъ, л҃. писмена и҆ о́смь, ѡ҆́ва убѡ по чинѹ гръчьскыхь пи́сменъ, ѡ҆́ва же по словѣн҆стѣи рѣчи.

Transliteration (with adapted punctuation, removed diacritics, resolved abbreviations):

Prěžde ubo slověne ne iměhǫ knigъ, nǫ črъtami i rězami čьtěhǫ i gataahǫ pogani sǫšte; krъstivše že sę, rimьskami i grъčьskymi pismeny nǫždaahǫ sę [pisati] slověnьsky rěčь bezъ ustroenia. Nǫ kako možetъ sę pisati dobrě grъčьskymi pismeni b[og]ъ, ili živōtъ, ili ʒělō, ili cr[ъ]kovь, ili čaanie, ili širōta, ili jadь, ili ǫdu, ili junostь, ili ǫzykъ, i inaa pod[o]bnaa simь? I tako běšǫ mnoga lěta. Po tom že čl[ově]koljubec b[og]ъ [...] posla im s[vę]t[a]go Kōstantina filosofa naricaemago Kirila, mǫža pravedna i istinna, i sьtvori imъ [30] pismena i osmь, ōva ubō po činu grъčьskyhь pismenъ, ōva že po slověnьstěi rěči.

Translation: (Note: Partly translated also by Fine, wholly by Veder in English Vaillant in French.)

In the past, the Slavs did not have books, but read and divined by means of strokes and incisions, being pagans. Having been baptised, they had to write the Slavic speech with Roman and Greek letters without any system. But with Greek letters how can one write words such as God, or life, or very, or church, or waiting, or width, or meal, or where, or youth, or tongue, and other similar ones? And so it was for many years. Then the mankind-loving God [...] sent them Saint Constantine the Philosopher, called Cyril, a just and upright man, and he created thirty-eight letters for them, some in the manner of Greek letters, and some in accordance with Slavic speech.

== Legacy ==
Hrabar Nunatak on Greenwich Island in the South Shetland Islands, Antarctica, is named for Chernorizets Hrabar.

== See also ==
- Cosmas the Priest
- Pre-Christian Slavic writing
- History of Bulgaria
