= Yakoruda =

Yakoruda Якоруда
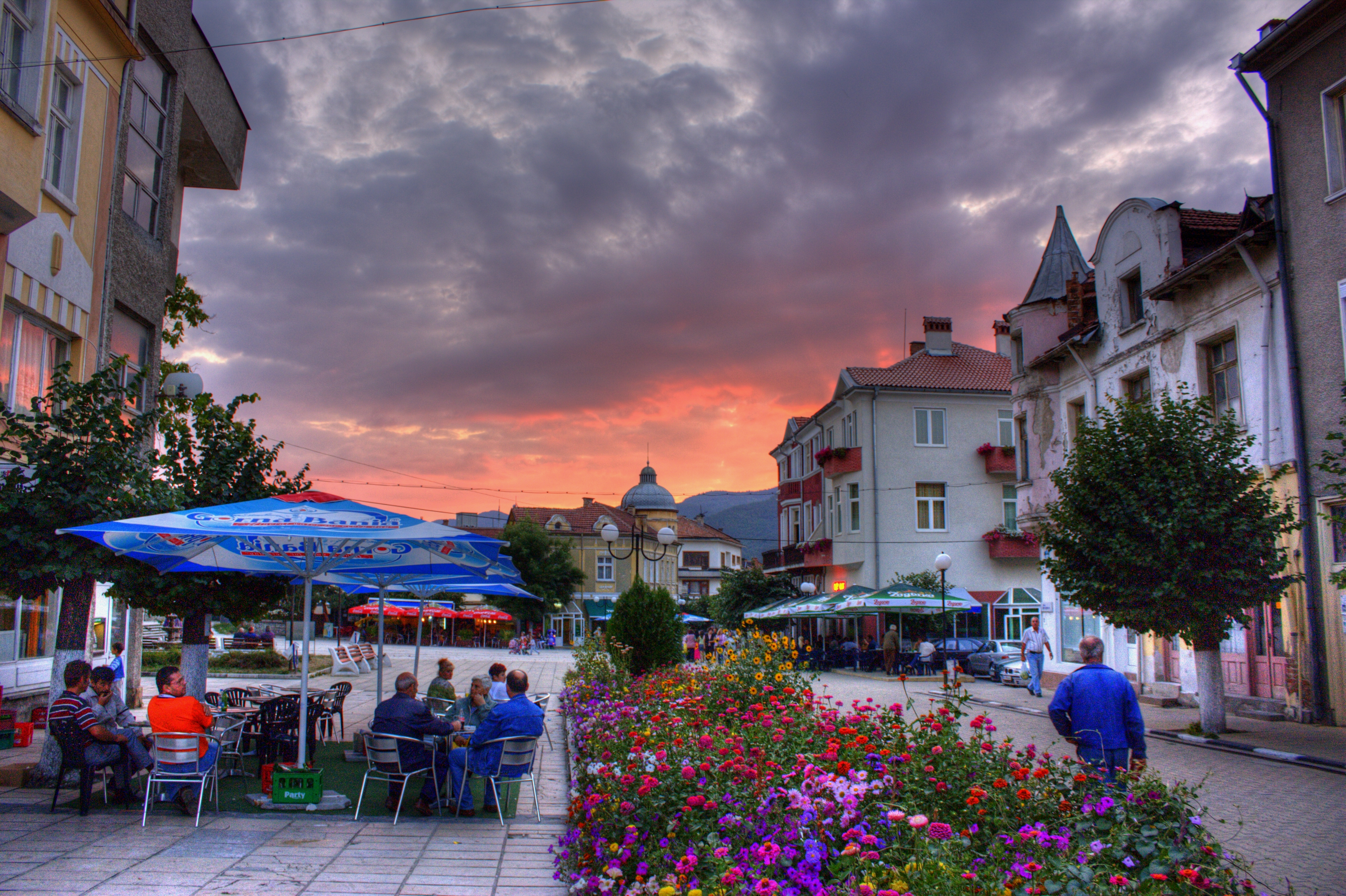
- Sunset in Yakoruda

- Location of Yakoruda
- Coordinates: 42°1′N 23°41′E
- Country: Bulgaria
- Provinces (Oblast): Blagoevgrad

Government
  - Mayor: Nuredin Kafelov
- Elevation: 888 m (2,913 ft)

Population (15.06.2010)
  - Total: 6,299
- Time zone: UTC+2 (EET)
  - Summer (DST): UTC+3 (EEST)
- Postal Code: 2790
- Area code: 07442
- License plate: E

Yakoruda (Bulgarian: Якоруда [jɐkoˈrudɐ]) is a Bulgarian town located in the southwestern part of the country. A part of the Blagoevgrad Province, it is the seat of Yakuroda Municipality which is the north-easternmost in the province. The town lies in the Rhodope Mountains, along the Mesta River, 26 km west of the town of Velingrad. Yakoruda was proclaimed a town on 9 September 1964, having previously been officially classified as a village.

A plurality of the residents are Muslim Bulgarians (Pomaks), the rest being for the most part Eastern Orthodox.

Notable natives are Survivor BG season one runner-up Ahmed Shuganov, Minister of Labour and Social Policy Emiliya Maslarova, and Dr. Anna Petrova-Mayor, Professor of Physics at California State University Chico.

== Honour ==
Yakoruda Glacier on Greenwich Island in the South Shetland Islands, Antarctica is named after Yakoruda.

== Gallery ==
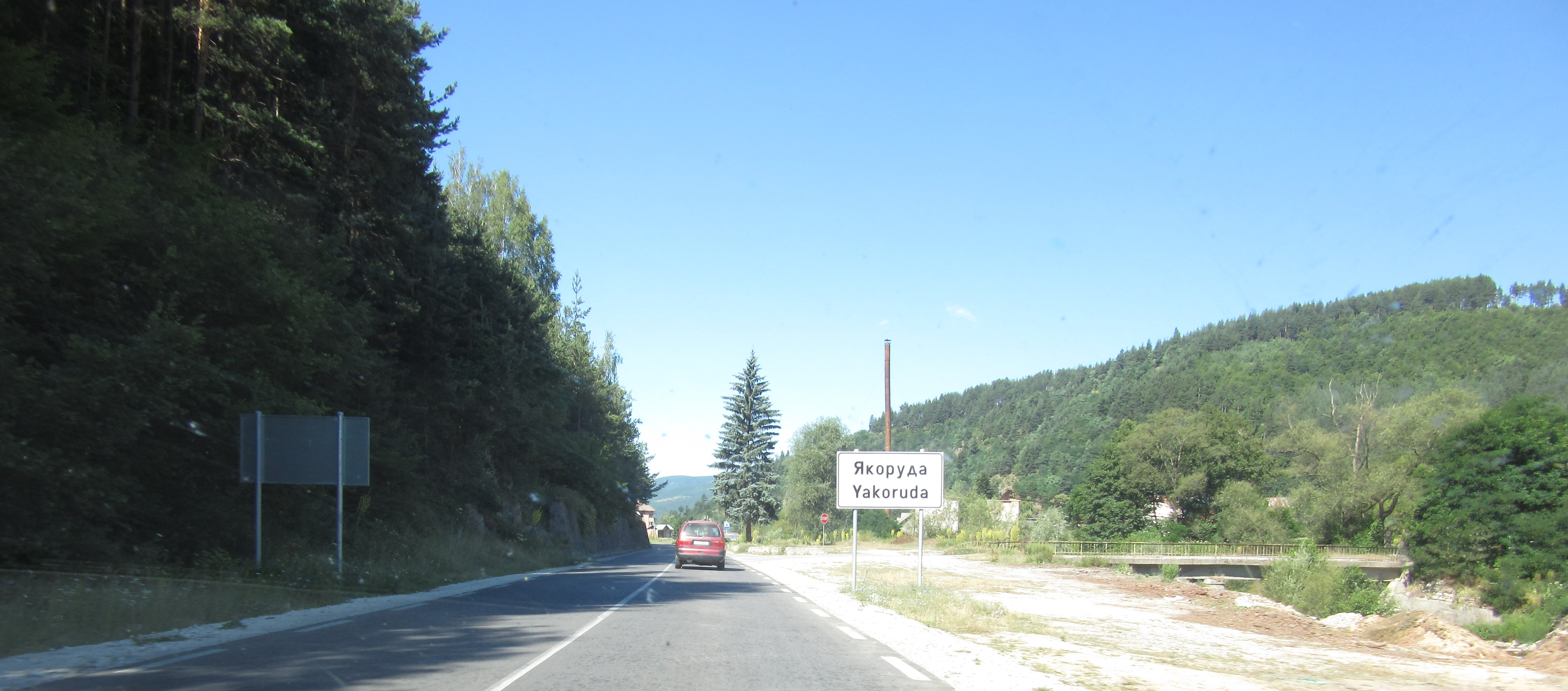
Entrance road to Yakoruda from Yundola

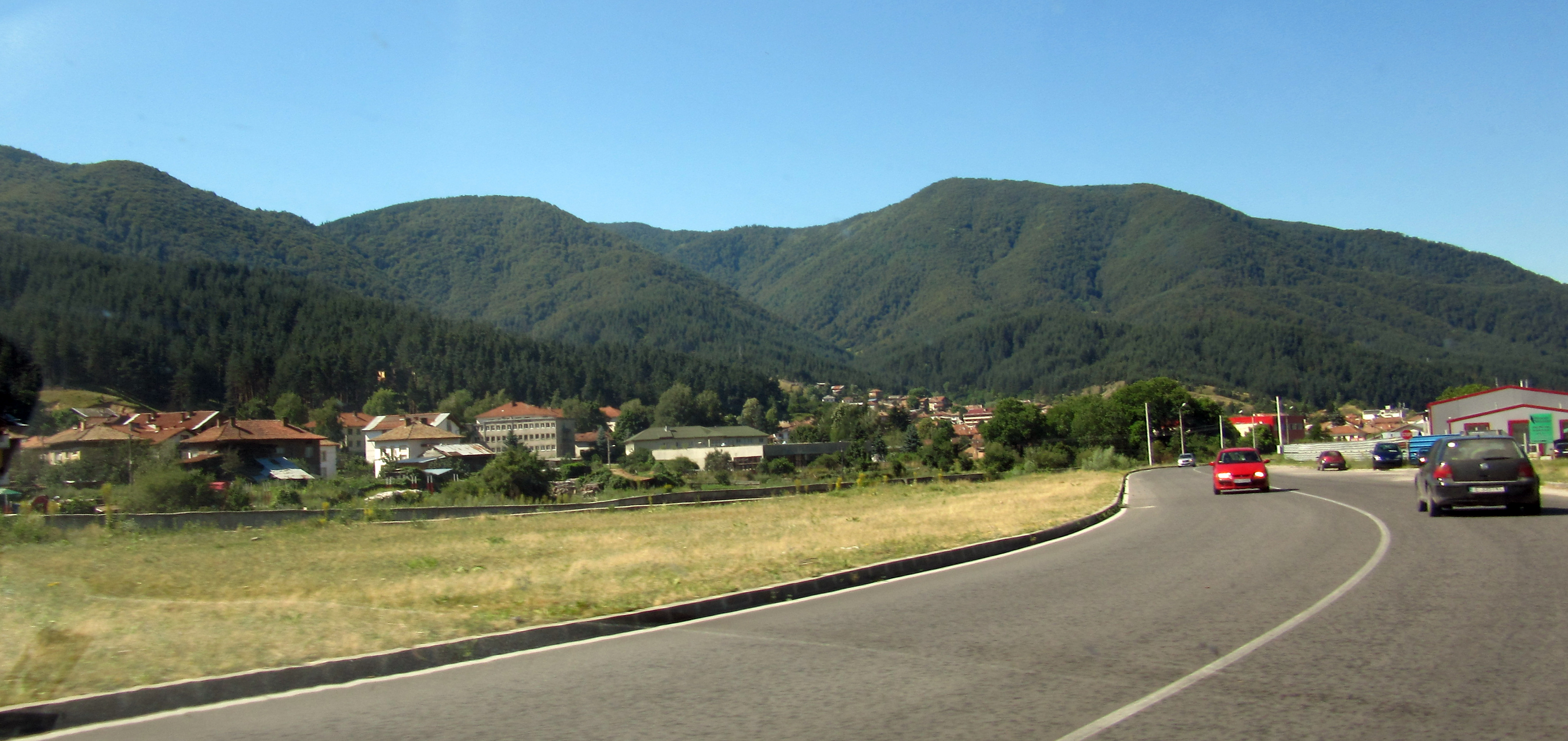
View of Yakoruda central parts

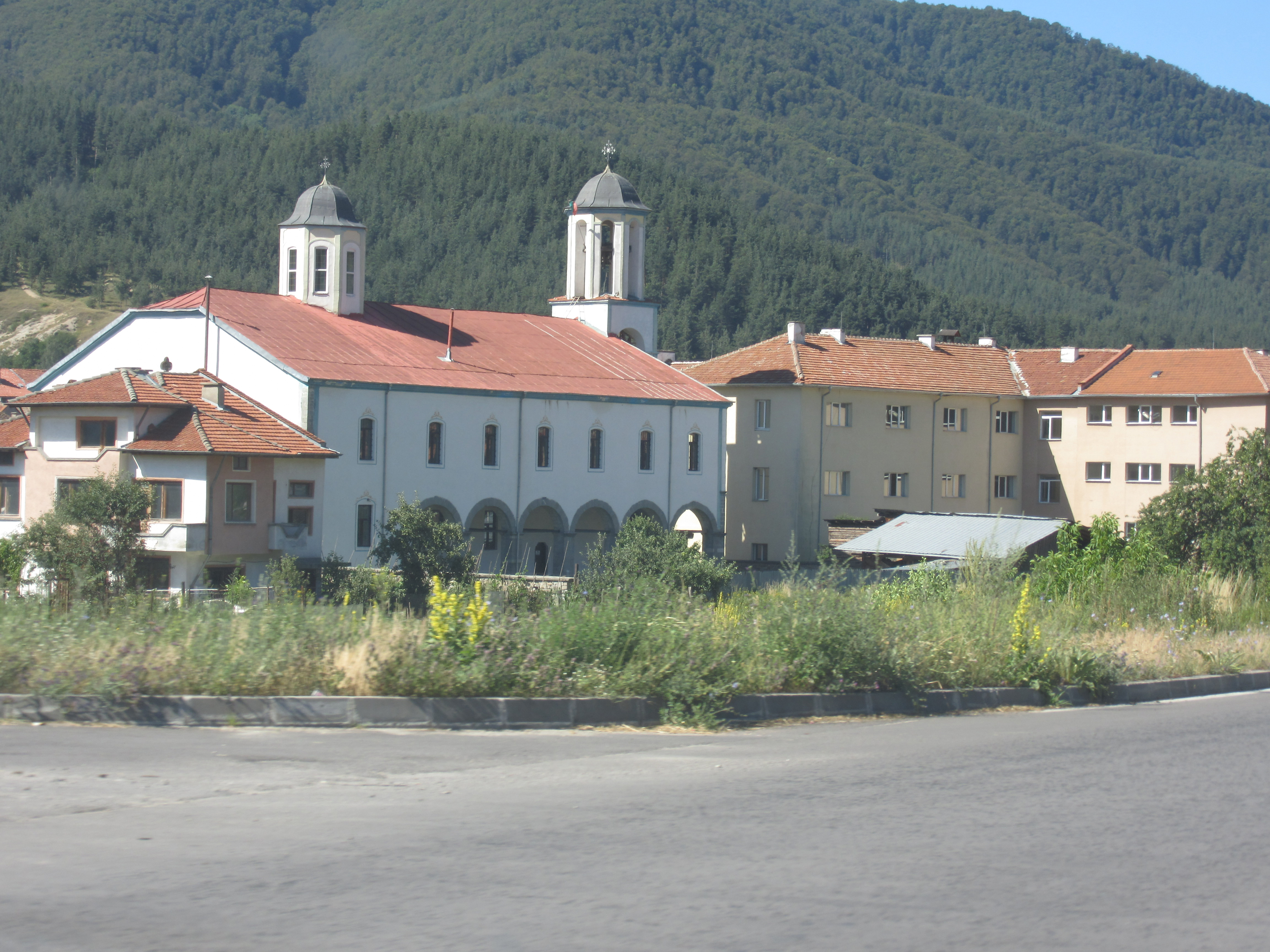
Yakoruda Orthodox church and town school

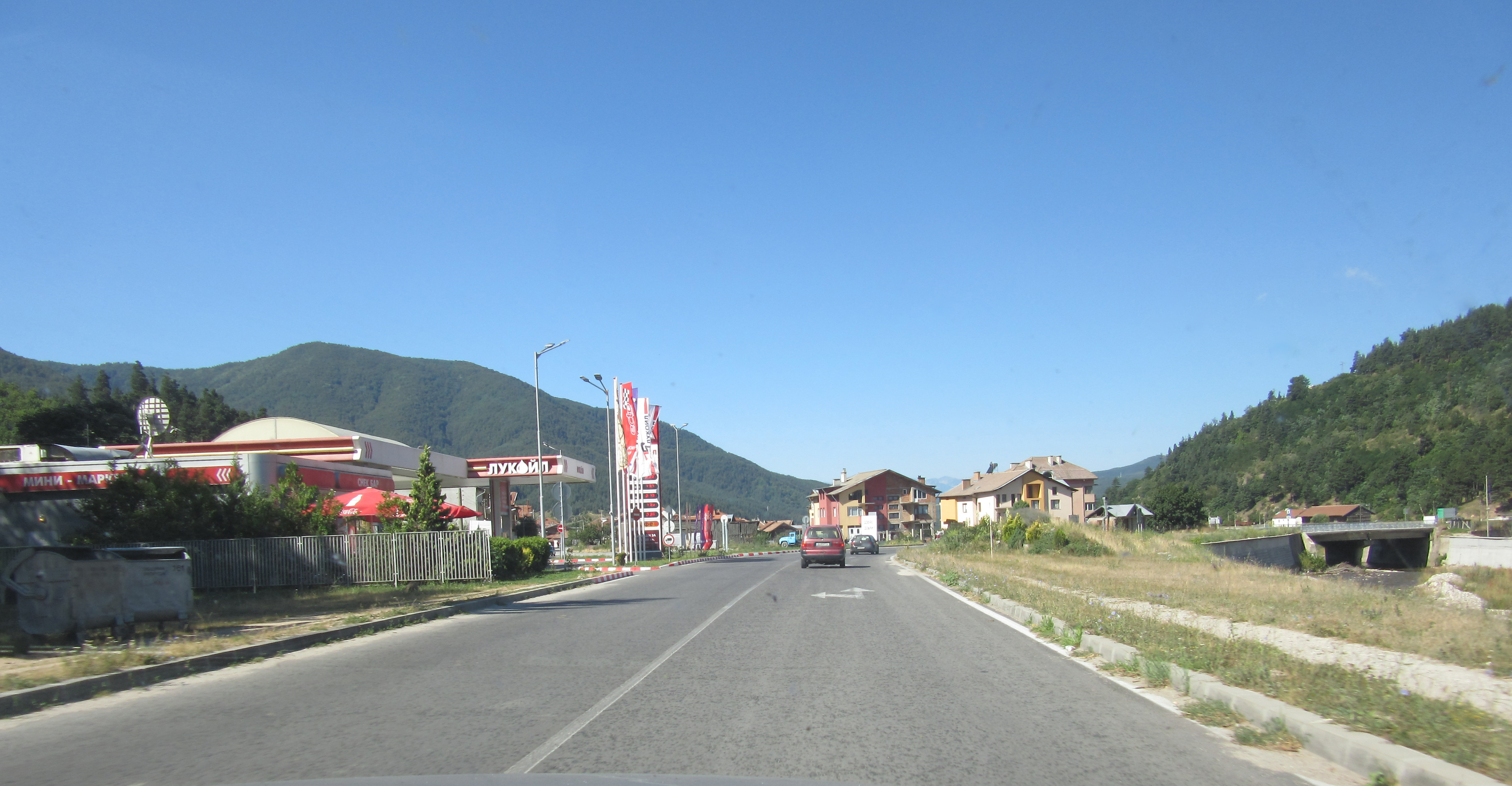
Yakoruda Lukoil gas station at the exit road to Yundola
