= Crutch Peaks =

Mountain in Greenwich Island, South Shetland Islands, Antarctica

Location of Greenwich Island in the South Shetland Islands.

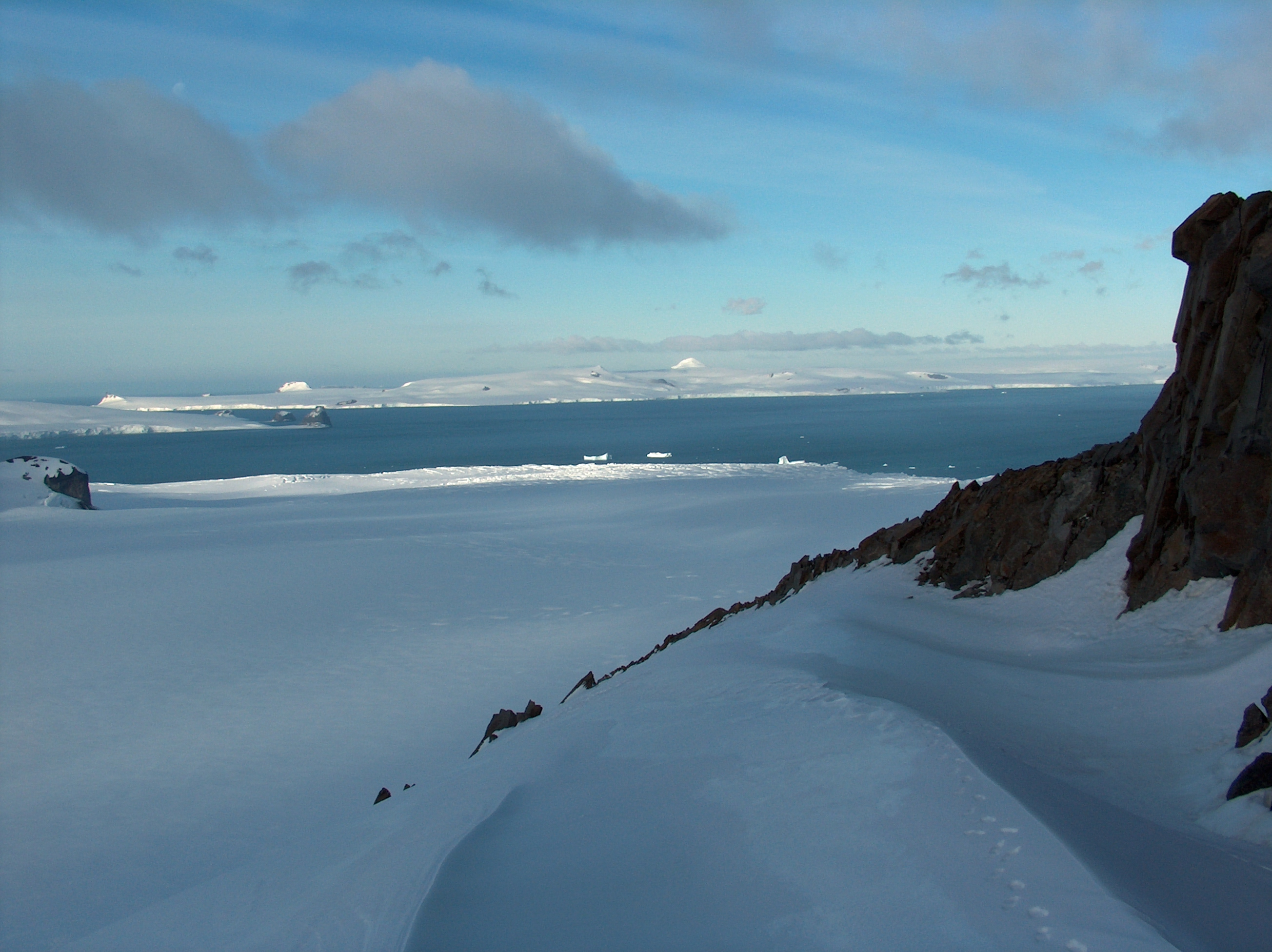
Crutch Peaks (in the central background) from near Ravda Peak, Livingston Island, with McFarlane Strait, Inott Point and Edinburgh Hill in the middle ground.

Crutch Peaks is a dark, rocky ridge extending 900 m in north–south direction and rising to 275 m in the north extremity of Dryanovo Heights, Greenwich Island in the South Shetland Islands, Antarctica. The peak surmounts Yakoruda Glacier to the south-southwest, Teteven Glacier to the south-southeast, and Miletich Point and Kabile Island to the north.

The feature was charted by the Discovery Investigations and named descriptively.

== Location ==
The peaks are centred at 62°27′12.7″S 59°56′15.1″W which is 840 m south of Miletich Point, 2.25 km west-southwest of Aprilov Point, 3.55 northwest of Sevtopolis Peak, 2.82 km north of Panagyurishte Nunatak, 2.67 km east of Greaves Peak and 1.19 km east of Hrabar Nunatak (British mapping in 1935 and 1968, and Bulgarian in 2005 and 2009).

== See also ==
- Dryanovo Heights
- Greenwich Island

== Maps ==
- L.L. Ivanov et al. Antarctica: Livingston Island and Greenwich Island, South Shetland Islands. Scale 1:100000 topographic map. Sofia: Antarctic Place-names Commission of Bulgaria, 2005.
- L.L. Ivanov. Antarctica: Livingston Island and Greenwich, Robert, Snow and Smith Islands. Scale 1:120000 topographic map. Troyan: Manfred Wörner Foundation, 2009. ISBN 978-954-92032-6-4
