= Teteven Glacier =

Glacier in Antarctica

- Location of Greenwich Island in the South Shetland Islands

- Location within South Shetland Islands Location within Antarctica
- Location: Greenwich Island; South Shetland Islands
- Coordinates: 62°27′40″S 59°52′20″W
- Length: 3.5 nmi (6 km; 4 mi)
- Width: 2 nmi (4 km; 2 mi)
- Thickness: unknown
- Terminus: Haskovo Cove and Skaptopara Cove
- Status: unknown

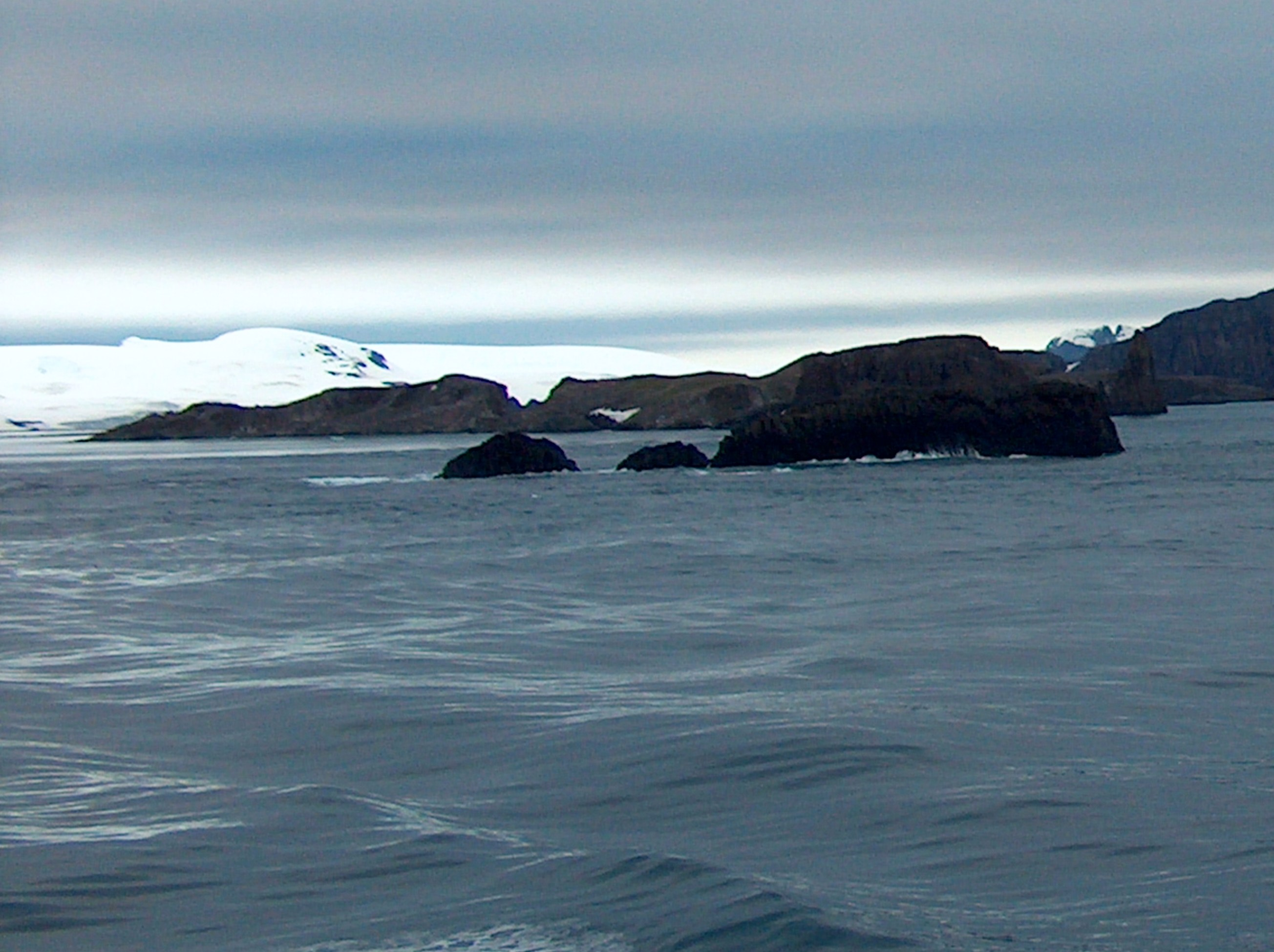
Teteven Glacier from Aitcho Islands.

Teteven Glacier (Bulgarian: ледник Тетевен, romanized: lednik Teteven, IPA: [ˈlɛdnik ˈtɛtɛvɛn]) is a glacier on Greenwich Island in the South Shetland Islands, Antarctica situated east of Yakoruda Glacier, west of Quito Glacier, northwest of Traub Glacier and north of Murgash Glacier. It extends 6.5 km in east-west direction and 3.8 km in north-south direction, and drains the north slopes of Dryanovo Heights into the Drake Passage in Haskovo Cove and Skaptopara Cove between Miletich Point and the ice-free area at Agüedo Point.

The glacier is named after the town of Teteven in the central Balkan Mountains, Bulgaria.

== Location ==
Teteven Glacier is centred at 62°27′40″S 59°52′20″W (Bulgarian mapping in 2005 and 2009).

== See also ==
- List of glaciers in the Antarctic
- Glaciology

== Maps ==
- L.L. Ivanov et al. Antarctica: Livingston Island and Greenwich Island, South Shetland Islands. Scale 1:100000 topographic map. Sofia: Antarctic Place-names Commission of Bulgaria, 2005.
- L.L. Ivanov. Antarctica: Livingston Island and Greenwich, Robert, Snow and Smith Islands. Scale 1:120000 topographic map. Troyan: Manfred Wörner Foundation, 2009. ISBN 978-954-92032-6-4
