= Mount Plymouth =

Location of Greenwich Island in the South Shetland Islands.

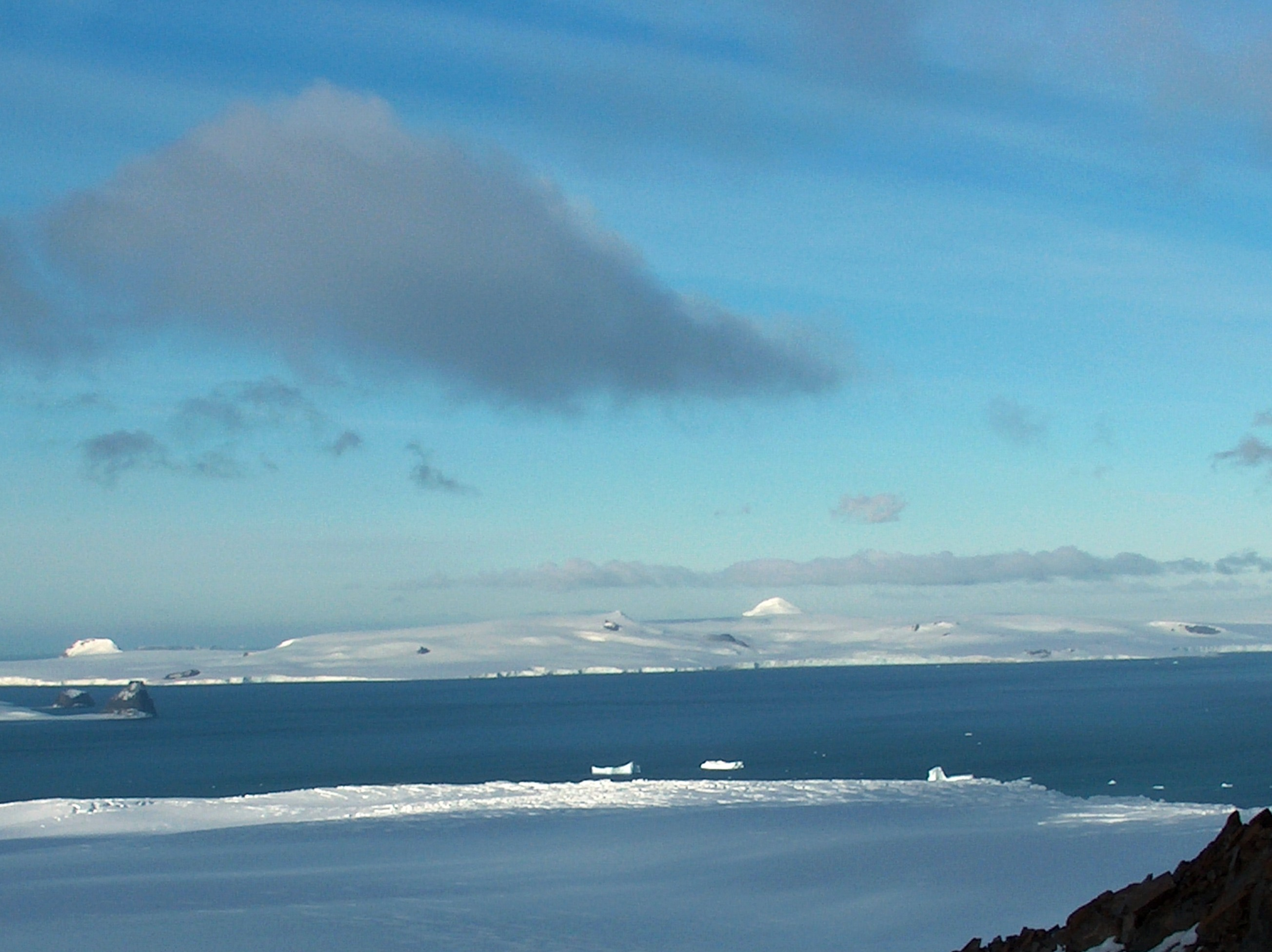
Mount Plymouth (the summit in the background) from near Ravda Peak, Livingston Island.

Mount Plymouth or Mount Osorno is a conspicuous peak rising to 520 m (1,710 ft) in the northeast extremity of Dryanovo Heights, Greenwich Island in the South Shetland Islands, Antarctica. The peak has precipitous and partly ice-free northern slopes, and surmounts Teteven Glacier to the northwest, Quito Glacier to the northeast and Traub Glacier to the southeast.

The feature was charted by the Discovery Investigations and named after the city of Plymouth, England.

== Location ==
The peak is located at 62°27′44″S 59°48′58.5″W which is 3.1 km (1.9 mi) east by north of Sevtopolis Peak, 5.1 km (3.2 mi) west-southwest of Spark Point, 4.47 km (2.78 mi) north-northeast of Tile Ridge and 4.9 km (3.0 mi) northeast of Lloyd Hill (British mapping in 1935 and 1968, Chilean in 1947, Argentine in 1953, and Bulgarian in 2005 and 2009).

== See also ==
- Dryanovo Heights
- Greenwich Island

== Maps ==
- L.L. Ivanov et al. Antarctica: Livingston Island and Greenwich Island, South Shetland Islands. Scale 1:100000 topographic map. Sofia: Antarctic Place-names Commission of Bulgaria, 2005.
- L.L. Ivanov. Antarctica: Livingston Island and Greenwich, Robert, Snow and Smith Islands. Scale 1:120000 topographic map. Troyan: Manfred Wörner Foundation, 2009. ISBN 978-954-92032-6-4
