= Lloyd Hill =

Mountain in the Antarctica

Location of Greenwich Island in the South Shetland Islands.

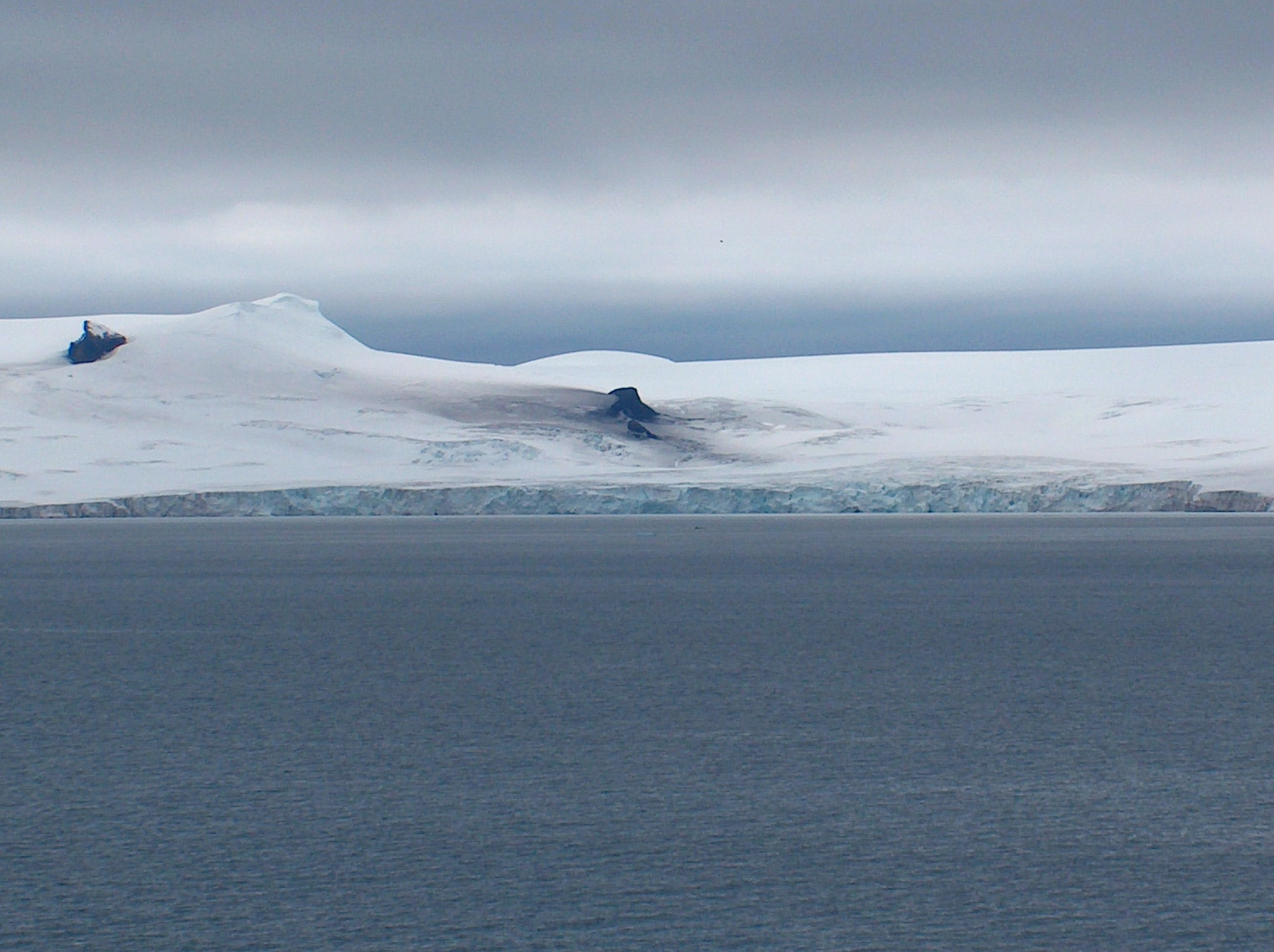
Lloyd Hill (on the left) from Half Moon Island, with Kotrag Nunatak and Altsek Nunatak in the foreground.

Topographic map of Livingston Island, Greenwich, Robert, Snow and Smith Islands.

Lloyd Hill is an ice-covered hill rising to 335 m in the southwest of Dryanovo Heights, Greenwich Island in the South Shetland Islands, Antarctica. The hill surmounts Teteven Glacier to the north and Murgash Glacier to the southeast.

The name derives from 'Lloyd's Land', an early name for Greenwich Island.

== Location ==
The peak is located at 62°29′23.4″S 59°53′25.9″W which is 2,6 km south by west of Sevtopolis Peak, 4.9 km southeast of Mount Plymouth, 2.38 km west-northwest of Tile Ridge, 2.17 km north-northeast of Yovkov Point and 3.4 km east of Kerseblept Nunatak (British mapping in 1962 and 1968, and Bulgarian in 2005 and 2009.

== See also ==
- Breznik Heights
- Greenwich Island

== Maps ==
- L.L. Ivanov et al. Antarctica: Livingston Island and Greenwich Island, South Shetland Islands. Scale 1:100000 topographic map. Sofia: Antarctic Place-names Commission of Bulgaria, 2005.
- L.L. Ivanov. Antarctica: Livingston Island and Greenwich, Robert, Snow and Smith Islands. Scale 1:120000 topographic map. Troyan: Manfred Wörner Foundation, 2009. ISBN 978-954-92032-6-4
