= Traub Glacier =

Glacier in Antarctica

- Location of Greenwich Island in the South Shetland Islands

- Location within South Shetland Islands Location within Antarctica
- Location: Greenwich Island; South Shetland Islands
- Coordinates: 62°28′31″S 59°48′00″W
- Length: 2 nmi (4 km; 2 mi)
- Width: 1.4 nmi (3 km; 2 mi)
- Thickness: unknown
- Terminus: Discovery Bay
- Status: unknown

Topographic map of Livingston Island, Greenwich, Robert, Snow and Smith Islands.

Traub Glacier is a glacier on Greenwich Island in the South Shetland Islands, Antarctica extending 2.5 km in northwest-southeast direction and 4 km in southwest-northeast direction and draining the east slopes of Dryanovo Heights to flow eastwards into Discovery Bay.

The feature was named by the 1947 Chilean Antarctic Expedition after Lieutenant Norberto Traub, a member of the expedition.

== Location ==
The glacier is centred at 62°28′31″S 59°48′00″W (Bulgarian mapping in 2005 and 2009).

== See also ==
- List of glaciers in the Antarctic
- Glaciology

== Maps ==
- L.L. Ivanov et al. Antarctica: Livingston Island and Greenwich Island, South Shetland Islands. Scale 1:100000 topographic map. Sofia: Antarctic Place-names Commission of Bulgaria, 2005.
- L.L. Ivanov. Antarctica: Livingston Island and Greenwich, Robert, Snow and Smith Islands. Scale 1:120000 topographic map. Troyan: Manfred Wörner Foundation, 2009. ISBN 978-954-92032-6-4
