= Hrabar Nunatak =

Rocky peak in the Antarctica

Location of Greenwich Island in the South Shetland Islands.

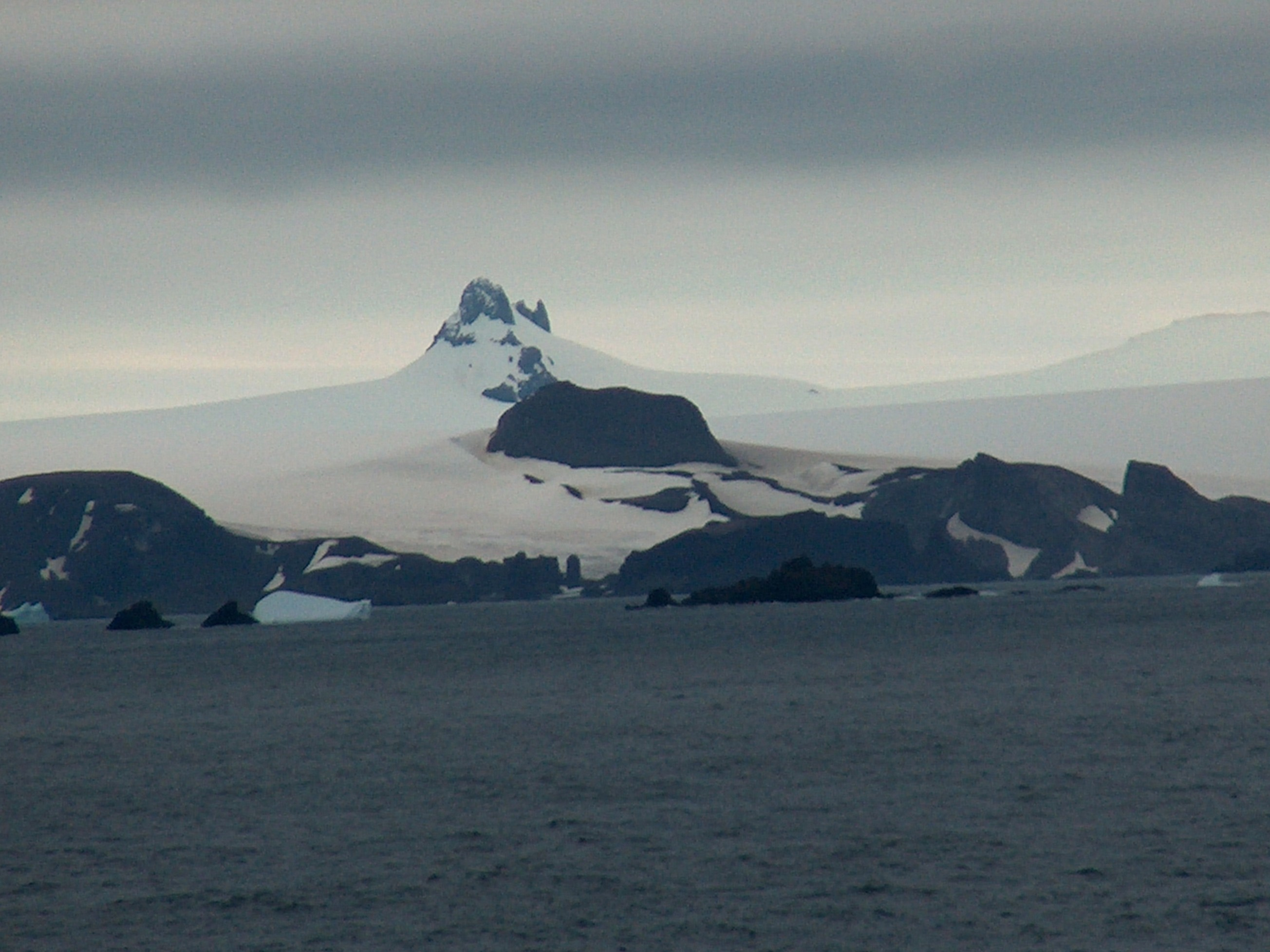
Hrabar Nunatak from English Strait, with Sharp Peak, Livingston Island in the background.

Topographic map of Livingston Island, Greenwich, Robert, Snow and Smith Islands.

Hrabar Nunatak (Nunatak Hrabar \'nu-na-tak 'hra-b&r\) is a 160m rocky peak on the north coast of Greenwich Island in the South Shetland Islands, Antarctica, and overlooking Yakoruda Glacier to the south. The peak is named after the Bulgarian scholar Chernorizets Hrabar (9th Century AD).

== Location ==
The cliff is located at 62°27′10.5″S 59°57′38″W, which is 1.5 km east of Greaves Peak, 1.2 km west of Crutch Peaks, and 1.15 km south of Pavlikeni Point and 3.9 km north of Kerseblept Nunatak (Bulgarian topographic survey Tangra 2004/05 and mapping in 2005 and 2009).

== Maps ==
- L.L. Ivanov et al. Antarctica: Livingston Island and Greenwich Island, South Shetland Islands. Scale 1:100000 topographic map. Sofia: Antarctic Place-names Commission of Bulgaria, 2005.
- L.L. Ivanov. Antarctica: Livingston Island and Greenwich, Robert, Snow and Smith Islands. Scale 1:120000 topographic map. Troyan: Manfred Wörner Foundation, 2009.
