= Kabile Island =

Island in Antarctica

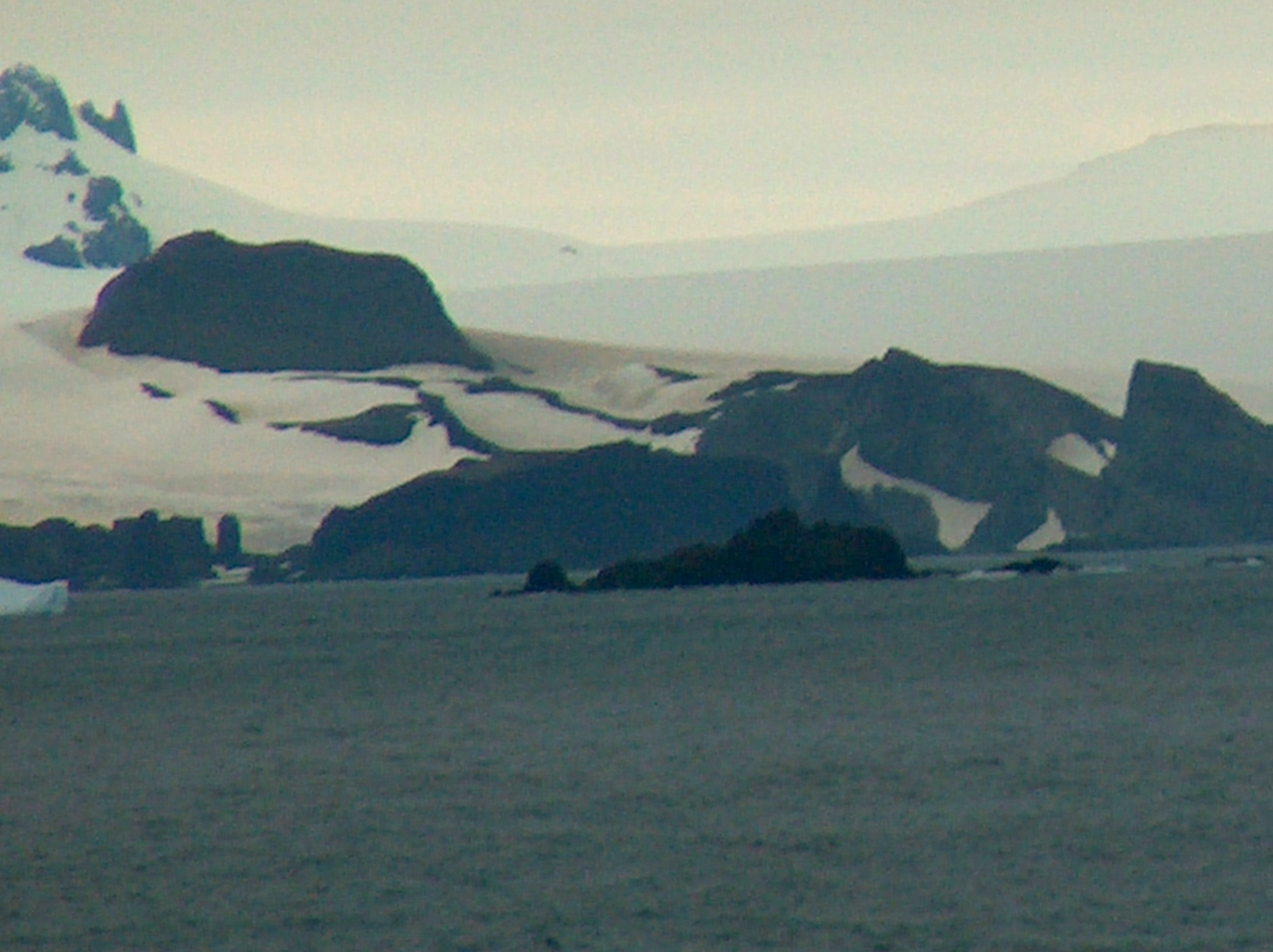
- Kabile Island from English Strait, with Hrabar Nunatak, Greenwich Island and Sharp Peak, Livingston Island in the background

- Location of Kabile Island

- Location within Antarctica Location within Antarctic Peninsula

Geography
- Location: Antarctica
- Coordinates: 62°26′30″S 59°56′33″W
- Archipelago: South Shetland Islands
- Area: 19 ha (47 acres)
- Length: 0.7 km (0.43 mi)

Administration
- Administered under the Antarctic Treaty System

Demographics
- Population: Uninhabited

Kabile Island (Bulgarian: остров Кабиле, romanized: ostrov Kabile, IPA: [ˈɔstrof kɐbiˈlɛ]) is an Antarctic island extending 700 m (770 yd) in south–north direction and 450 m (490 yd) wide, situated off the north coast of Greenwich Island in the South Shetland Islands, Antarctica. It has a surface area of 19 hectares (47 acres).

Named after the ancient Thracian town of Kabile near the present Bulgarian city of Yambol.

== Location ==
Topographic map of Livingston Island, Greenwich, Robert, Snow and Smith Islands

The island is located at 62°26′30″S 59°56′33″W which is 950 m (1,040 yd) east of Pavlikeni Point, 1 km (0.62 mi) north of Crutch Peaks, 200 m (220 yd) northwest of Miletich Point, and 2.5 km (1.6 mi) west-southwest of Ongley Island (Chilean mapping in 1966, British mapping in 1968 and Bulgarian in 2009).

== See also ==
- Composite Antarctic Gazetteer
- List of Antarctic islands south of 60° S
- SCAR
- Territorial claims in Antarctica

== Maps ==
- L.L. Ivanov et al. Antarctica: Livingston Island and Greenwich Island, South Shetland Islands. Scale 1:100000 topographic map. Sofia: Antarctic Place-names Commission of Bulgaria, 2005
- L.L. Ivanov. Antarctica: Livingston Island and Greenwich, Robert, Snow and Smith Islands. Scale 1:120000 topographic map. Troyan: Manfred Wörner Foundation, 2009
- Antarctic Digital Database (ADD). Scale 1:250000 topographic map of Antarctica. Scientific Committee on Antarctic Research (SCAR). Since 1993, regularly upgraded and updated
