= Aprilov Point =

Point on Greenwich Island, Antarctica

Coordinates: 62°26′52″S 59°53′45″W

Location of Greenwich Island in the South Shetland Islands.

Topographic map of Livingston Island, Greenwich, Robert, Snow and Smith Islands.

Aprilov Point (Aprilov Nos \a-'pri-lov 'nos\) is a point on the north coast of Greenwich Island, Antarctica situated 6.9 km east of Duff Point, 2.1 km east-southeast of Kabile Island, 2.2 km east-northeast of Crutch Peaks, 1.8 km south of Ongley Island, 5.5 km west of Agüedo Point, and 2.3 km north-northwest of Sevtopolis Peak. Forming the east side of the entrance to Haskovo Cove and the west side of the entrance to Skaptopara Cove.

Named after the prominent Bulgarian educator Vasil Aprilov (1789-1847).

== Location ==
British mapping in 1968, and Bulgarian in 2005 and 2009.

== Maps ==
- L.L. Ivanov et al. Antarctica: Livingston Island and Greenwich Island, South Shetland Islands. Scale 1:100000 topographic map. Sofia: Antarctic Place-names Commission of Bulgaria, 2005.
- L.L. Ivanov. Antarctica: Livingston Island and Greenwich, Robert, Snow and Smith Islands. Scale 1:120000 topographic map. Troyan: Manfred Wörner Foundation, 2009.
