= Miletich Point =

Rocky point in Antarctica

Location of Greenwich Island in the South Shetland Islands.

Topographic map of Livingston Island, Greenwich, Robert, Snow and Smith Islands.

Miletich Point (Нос Милетич [ˈnos mi'letitʃ], Nos Miletich) is the rocky point forming the west side of the entrance to Haskovo Cove on Greenwich Island, South Shetland Islands in Antarctica. Situated 800 m north of the summit of Crutch Peaks, 200 m southeast of Kabile Island, 1.55 km east of Pavlikeni Point, and 2.1 km west of Aprilov Point.

Miletich Point is named for the Bulgarian linguist, ethnographer and historian Lyubomir Miletich (1863–1937).

== Location ==
The point is located at 62°26′45.7″S 59°56′12″W according to Bulgarian mapping in 2005 and 2009.

== Maps ==
- L.L. Ivanov et al. Antarctica: Livingston Island and Greenwich Island, South Shetland Islands. Scale 1:100000 topographic map. Sofia: Antarctic Place-names Commission of Bulgaria, 2005.
- L.L. Ivanov. Antarctica: Livingston Island and Greenwich, Robert, Snow and Smith Islands. Scale 1:120000 topographic map. Troyan: Manfred Wörner Foundation, 2009.
