= Quito Glacier =

Glacier in Antarctica

- Location of Greenwich Island in the South Shetland Islands

- Location within South Shetland Islands Location within Antarctica
- Location: Greenwich Island; South Shetland Islands
- Coordinates: 62°27′00″S 59°47′00″W
- Thickness: unknown
- Terminus: Canto Point
- Status: unknown

Topographic map of Livingston Island, Greenwich, Robert, Snow and Smith Islands.

Quito Glacier (62°27′S 59°47′W) is a glacier draining the northeast slopes of Mount Plymouth and flowing northeastwards into the sea west of Canto Point in north Greenwich Island, South Shetland Islands. It was named after the capital of Ecuador, c. 1990, by the Ecuadorian Antarctic Expedition.

== See also ==
- List of glaciers in the Antarctic
- Glaciology

== Maps ==
- L.L. Ivanov et al. Antarctica: Livingston Island and Greenwich Island, South Shetland Islands. Scale 1:100000 topographic map. Sofia: Antarctic Place-names Commission of Bulgaria, 2005.
- L.L. Ivanov. Antarctica: Livingston Island and Greenwich, Robert, Snow and Smith Islands. Scale 1:120000 topographic map. Troyan: Manfred Wörner Foundation, 2009. ISBN 978-954-92032-6-4
