= Sevtopolis Peak =

Location of Greenwich Island in the South Shetland Islands.

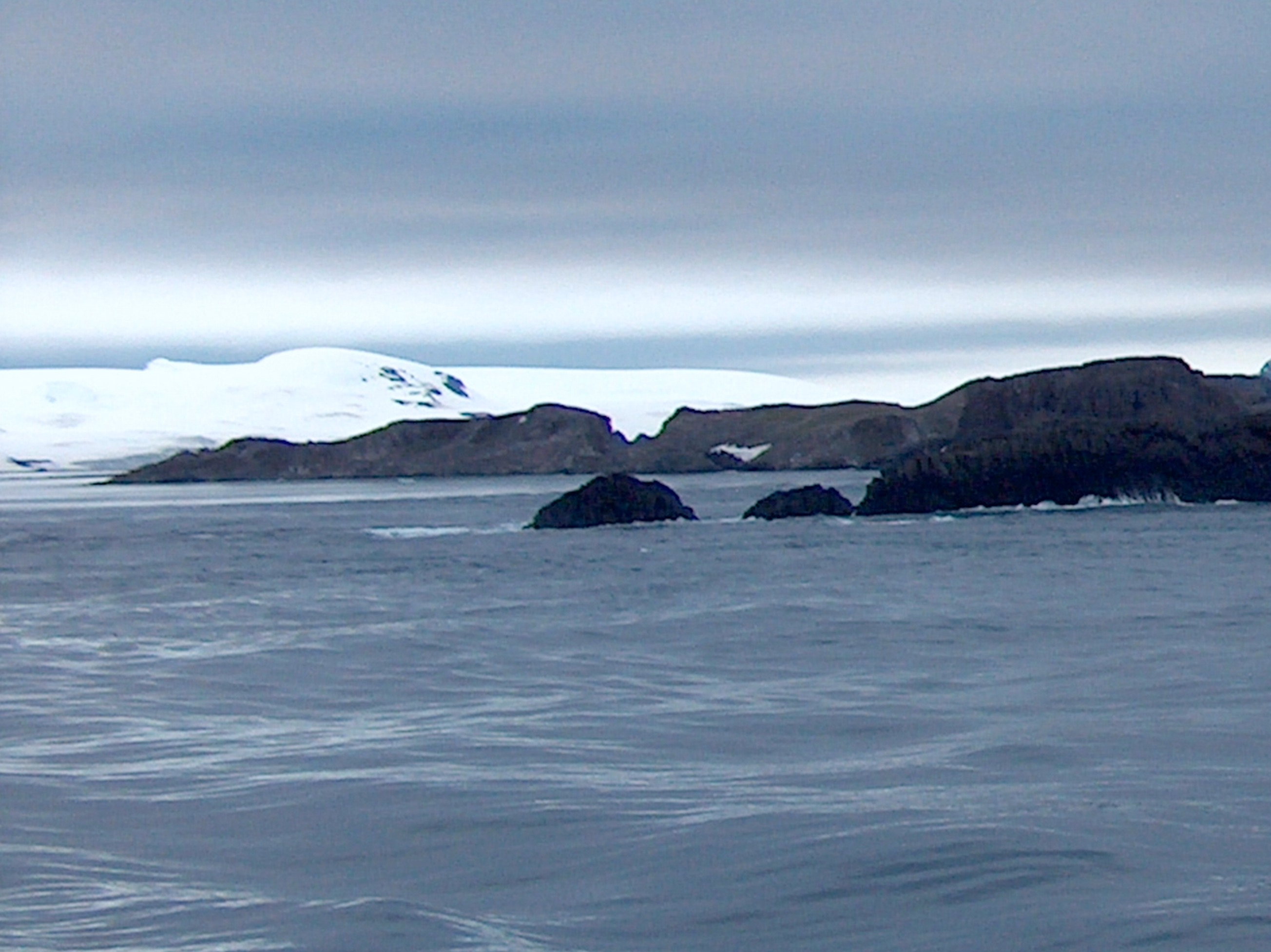
Sevtopolis Peak (in the background) from English Strait.

Topographic map of Livingston Island, Greenwich, Robert, Snow and Smith Islands.

Sevtopolis Peak (Bulgarian: връх Севтополис, romanized: vrah Sevtopolis, IPA: [ˈvrɤx sɛftoˈpɔlis]) is an ice-covered peak of elevation 300 m in Dryanovo Heights, Greenwich Island in the South Shetland Islands, Antarctica. Surmounting Teteven Glacier to the west, north and east.

The peak is named after the ancient Thracian capital city of Sevtopolis near the present day Bulgarian city of Kazanlak.

== Location ==
The peak is located at 62°28′03″S 59°52′33″W, which is 3.1 km west-southwest of Mount Plymouth, 3.5 km southeast of Crutch Peaks, and 2.65 km north-northeast of Lloyd Hill (Bulgarian topographic survey Tangra 2004/05 and mapping in 2005 and 2009).

== Maps ==
- L.L. Ivanov et al. Antarctica: Livingston Island and Greenwich Island, South Shetland Islands. Scale 1:100000 topographic map. Sofia: Antarctic Place-names Commission of Bulgaria, 2005.
- L.L. Ivanov. Antarctica: Livingston Island and Greenwich, Robert, Snow and Smith Islands. Scale 1:120000 topographic map. Troyan: Manfred Wörner Foundation, 2009. ISBN 978-954-92032-6-4
