= Agüedo Point =

Location of Greenwich Island in the South Shetland Islands.

Topographic map of Livingston Island, Greenwich, Robert, Snow and Smith Islands.

Agüedo Point is the point forming the north extremity of Greenwich Island in the South Shetland Islands, Antarctica and the west side of the entrance to Guayaquil Bay. The adjacent ice-free area of Flamingo Beach on the west covers 80 hectares (200 acres), and ends in Terimer Point, the east entrance point of Skaptopara Cove.

== Location ==
The point is located at 62°26′28″S 59°47′23″W, which is 3.2 km west of Spark Point, 2.72 km northeast of Mount Plymouth, 2.4 km east-northeast of Terimer Point, 5.6 km east by north of Aprilov Point and 850 m south of Dee Island from which it is separated by Orión Passage (British mapping in 1968, Chilean in 1998, and Bulgarian in 2005 and 2009).

== Maps ==
- L.L. Ivanov et al. Antarctica: Livingston Island and Greenwich Island, South Shetland Islands. Scale 1:100000 topographic map. Sofia: Antarctic Place-names Commission of Bulgaria, 2005.
