= Ongley Island =

Island in the South Shetland Islands, Antarctica

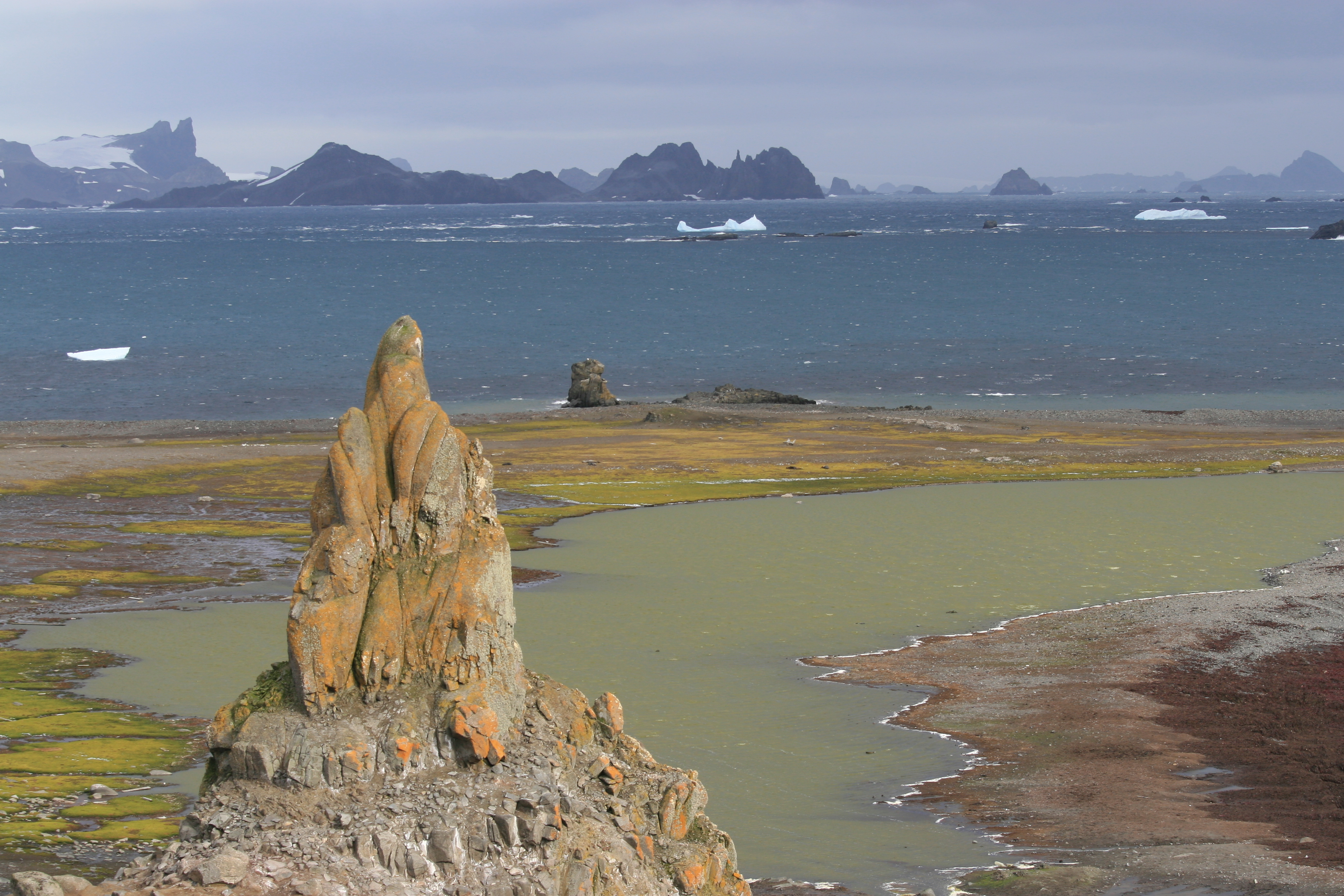
- Ongley Island (in the background) from Barrientos Island, Aitcho Islands

- Location on Antarctic Peninsula Location in Antarctica

Geography
- Location: Antarctica
- Coordinates: 62°25′48″S 59°53′14.6″W
- Archipelago: South Shetland Islands
- Area: 0.44 km^{2} (0.17 sq mi)
- Length: 1.35 km (0.839 mi)
- Width: 0.47 km (0.292 mi)

Administration
- Administered under the Antarctic Treaty System

Demographics
- Population: Uninhabited

Ongley Island is a rugged rocky island lying off the north coast of Greenwich Island in the South Shetland Islands, Antarctica. Extending 1.35 km (0.84 mi) in west-northwest direction and 470 m (510 yd) wide, with a surface area of 44 hectares (110 acres). The area was visited by early 19th century sealers.

The feature is named after L.T. Ongley, cartographer in the Admiralty Hydrographic Department in 1935.

== Location ==
The midpoint is located at 62°25′48″S 59°53′14.6″W and the island is lying 3.7 km (2.3 mi) west of Dee Island, 1.73 km (1.07 mi) north by east of Aprilov Point, Greenwich Island, 2.74 km (1.70 mi) northeast of Miletich Point, Greenwich Island, 2.52 km (1.57 mi) east-northeast of Kabile Island, 5.3 km (3.3 mi) south by east of Romeo Island and 3.7 km (2.3 mi) southwest of Stoker Island (British mapping in 1935 and 1968, Argentine in 1957, Chilean in 1971, and Bulgarian in 2005 and 2009).

Topographic map of Livingston Island, Greenwich, Robert, Snow and Smith Islands.

== See also ==
- Composite Antarctic Gazetteer
- Greenwich Island
- List of Antarctic islands south of 60° S
- SCAR
- South Shetland Islands
- Territorial claims in Antarctica

== Map ==
- L.L. Ivanov et al. Antarctica: Livingston Island and Greenwich Island, South Shetland Islands. Scale 1:100000 topographic map. Sofia: Antarctic Place-names Commission of Bulgaria, 2005.
