= Kerseblept Nunatak =

Location of Greenwich Island in the South Shetland Islands.

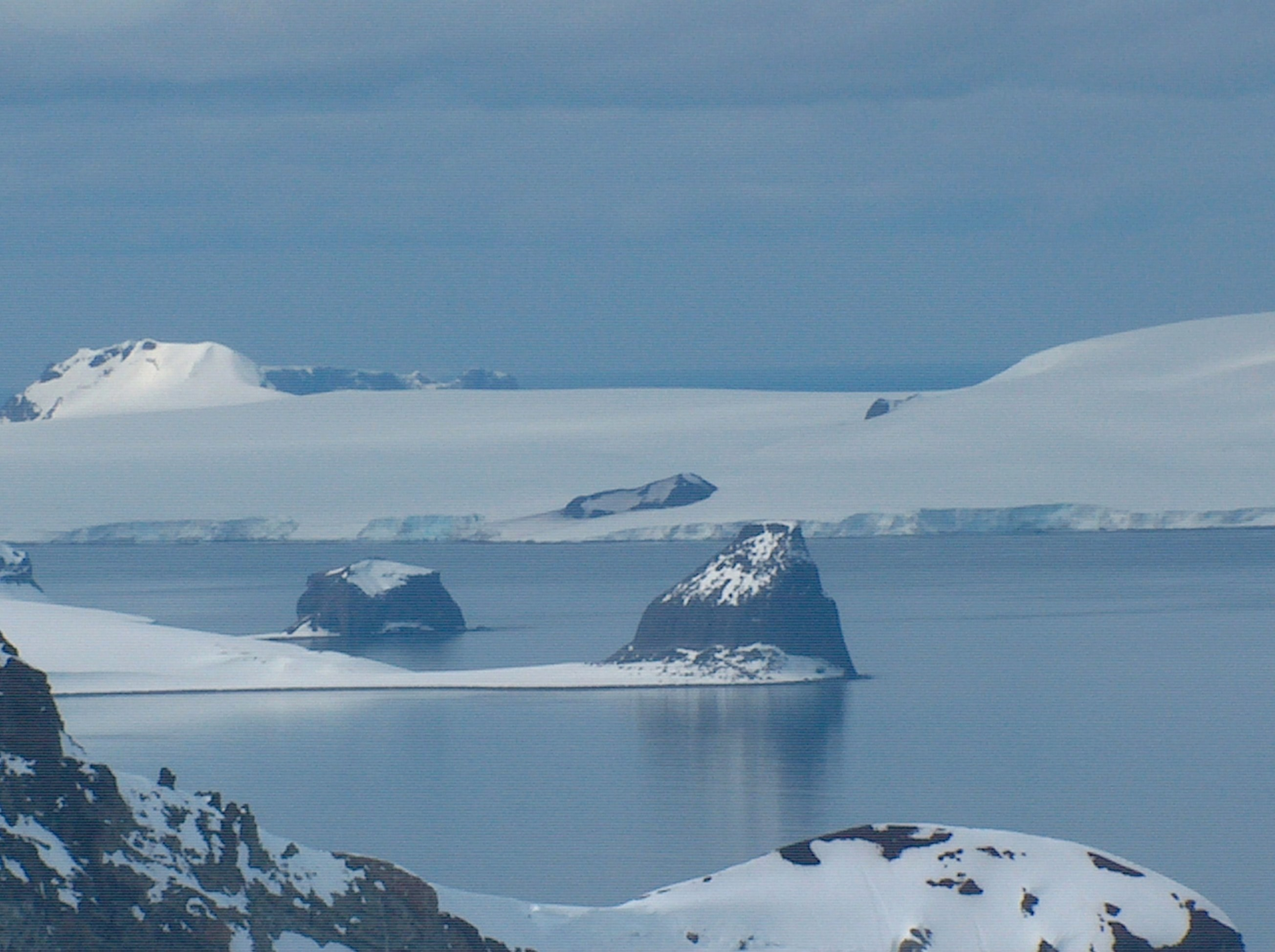
Kerseblept Nunatak (on the opposite coast of McFarlane Strait) from Lozen Nunatak, Livingston Island.

Topographic map of Livingston Island, Greenwich, Robert, Snow and Smith Islands.

Kerseblept Nunatak (Nunatak Kerseblept \'nu-na-tak ker-se-'blept\) is a rocky hill of elevation 90 m projecting from Yakoruda Glacier on Greenwich Island in the South Shetland Islands, Antarctica. The hill is named after the Thracian king Cersobleptes, 359-341 BC.

== Location ==
The hill is located at 62°29′16.5″S 59°57′18″W which is on the northeast coast of McFarlane Strait, 3.9 km south of Hrabar Nunatak, and 3.4 km west of Lloyd Hill (Bulgarian topographic survey Tangra 2004/05 and mapping in 2005 and 2009).

== Maps ==
- L.L. Ivanov et al. Antarctica: Livingston Island and Greenwich Island, South Shetland Islands. Scale 1:100000 topographic map. Sofia: Antarctic Place-names Commission of Bulgaria, 2005.
- L.L. Ivanov. Antarctica: Livingston Island and Greenwich, Robert, Snow and Smith Islands. Scale 1:120000 topographic map. Troyan: Manfred Wörner Foundation, 2009.
