= Dryanovo Heights =

Location of Greenwich Island in the South Shetland Islands.

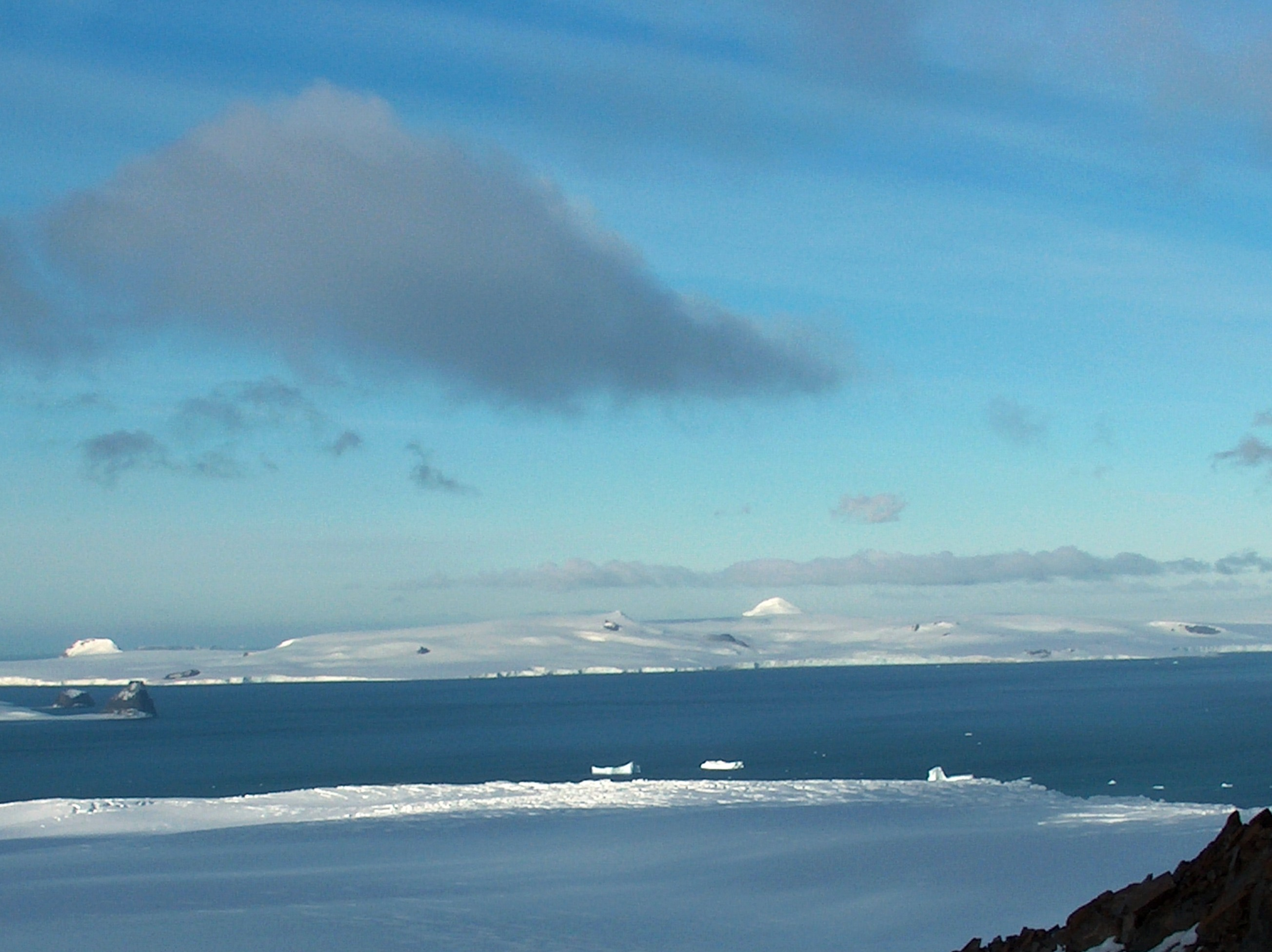
Dryanovo Heights

Topographic map of Livingston Island, Greenwich, Robert, Snow and Smith Islands.

Dryanovo Heights (Dryanovski Vazvisheniya \'drya-nov-ski v&-zvi-'she-ni-ya\) is an ice-covered heights, rising to 520 m in the northwest part of Greenwich Island. Extending 13 km in northwest-southeast direction, and 7 km in northeast-southwest direction. Featuring Mount Plymouth in the east, Crutch Peaks in the northwest, Lloyd Hill in the southwest, and Malamir Knoll in the southeast.

Named after the Bulgarian town of Dryanovo.

Registered in the SCAR Composite Antarctic Gazetteer.

== Location ==
The midpoint of the feature is located at 62°28′50″S 59°52′10″W.

== Maps ==
- L.L. Ivanov et al. Antarctica: Livingston Island and Greenwich Island, South Shetland Islands. Scale 1:100000 topographic map. Sofia: Antarctic Place-names Commission of Bulgaria, 2005.
- L.L. Ivanov. Antarctica: Livingston Island and Greenwich, Robert, Snow and Smith Islands. Scale 1:120000 topographic map. Troyan: Manfred Wörner Foundation, 2009. ISBN 978-954-92032-6-4
