= Ilinden Peak =

Location of Greenwich Island in the South Shetland Islands.

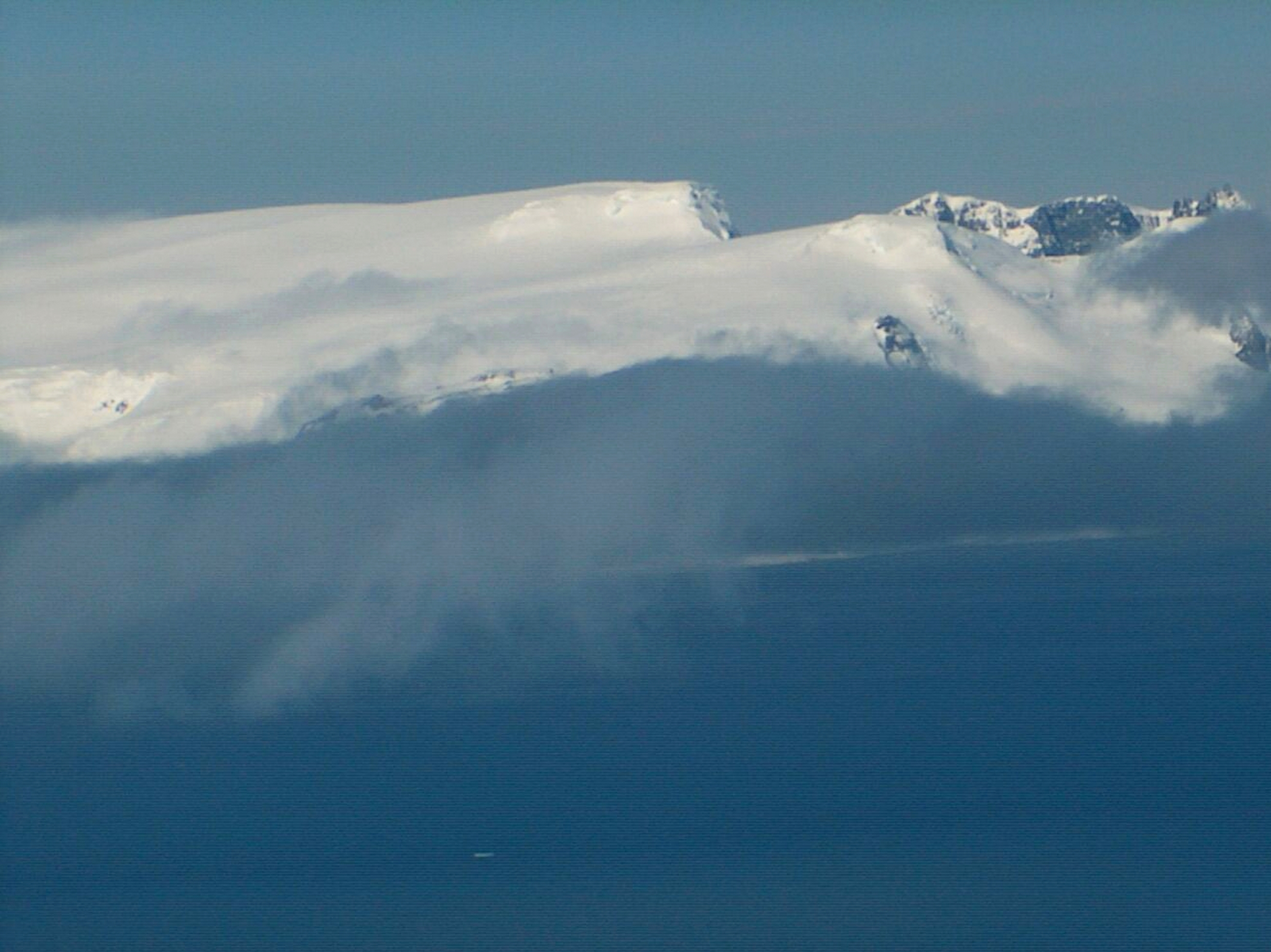
Ilinden Peak

Topographic map of Livingston Island, Greenwich, Robert, Snow and Smith Islands.

Ilinden Peak (Bulgarian: връх Илинден, romanized: vrah Ilinden, IPA: [ˈvrɤx ˈilindɛn]) is an ice-covered peak rising to 620 m in Breznik Heights on Greenwich Island, Antarctica. The peak has precipitous and partly ice-free south slopes, and surmounts Zheravna Glacier to the south, Solis Glacier to the northwest, and Fuerza Aérea Glacier to the north-northeast.

The feature is "named after the settlement of Ilinden in Southwestern Bulgaria, in connection with the 1903 Bulgarian uprising of Ilinden-Preobrazhenie for the liberation of Macedonia and Odrin (Adrianople) Thrace".

== Location ==
The peak is located at 62°32′08.5″S 59°41′43″W which is 940 m north of Maystora Peak, 1.22 km northeast of Razgrad Peak, 1.18 km east by north of Terter Peak, 2.87 km east of the highest point of Oborishte Ridge, 4.1 km south of Ferrer Point, 590 m west of Momchil Peak, 2 km west-northwest of the summit of Viskyar Ridge and 3.32 km northwest of Sartorius Point. British mapping in 1968, Bulgarian topographic survey Tangra 2004/05 and mapping in 2009.

== See also ==
- Breznik Heights
- Greenwich Island

== Maps ==
- L.L. Ivanov et al. Antarctica: Livingston Island and Greenwich Island, South Shetland Islands. Scale 1:100000 topographic map. Sofia: Antarctic Place-names Commission of Bulgaria, 2005.
- L.L. Ivanov. Antarctica: Livingston Island and Greenwich, Robert, Snow and Smith Islands. Scale 1:120000 topographic map. Troyan: Manfred Wörner Foundation, 2009. ISBN 978-954-92032-6-4
