= Maystora Peak =

Coordinates: 62°32′38.2″S 59°41′57″W

Location of Greenwich Island in the South Shetland Islands.

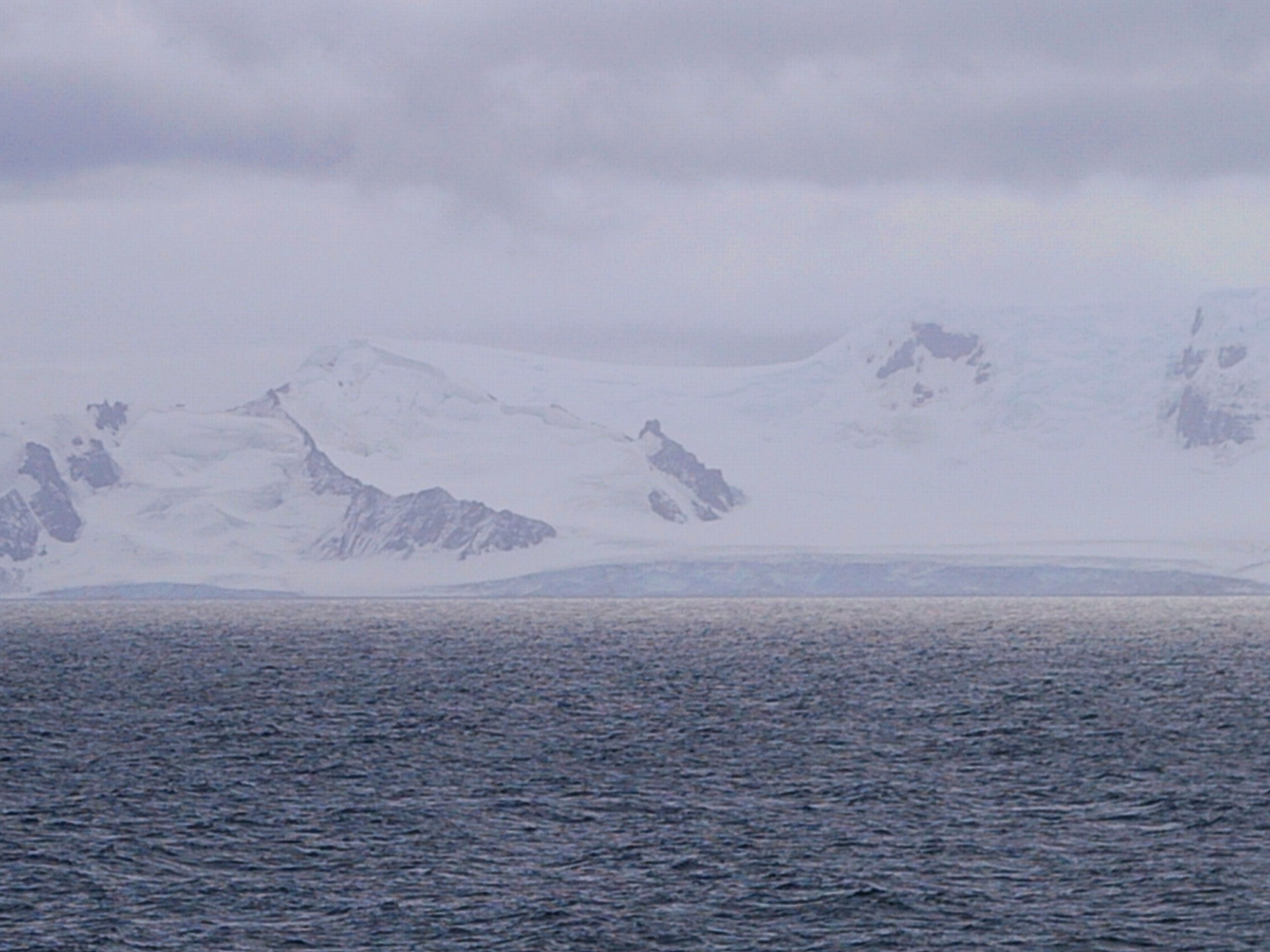
Maystora Peak

Topographic map of Livingston Island, Greenwich, Robert, Snow and Smith Islands.

Maystora Peak (Bulgarian: връх Майстора, romanized: vrah Maystora, IPA: [ˈvrɤx ˈmajstorɐ]) is a rocky peak rising to 350 m in Breznik Heights on Greenwich Island, Antarctica. Situated 580 m east of Razgrad Peak, 940 m south by west of Ilinden Peak, 2.13 km west of Viskyar Ridge, and 1.38 km northeast of the highest point of Ephraim Bluff. Overlooking Zheravna Glacier to the north, east, and south. Bulgarian topographic survey Tangra 2004/05. Named after the famous Bulgarian artist Vladimir Dimitrov – ‘Maystora’ (1882-1960).

== Maps ==
- L.L. Ivanov et al. Antarctica: Livingston Island and Greenwich Island, South Shetland Islands. Scale 1:100000 topographic map. Sofia: Antarctic Place-names Commission of Bulgaria, 2005.
- L.L. Ivanov. Antarctica: Livingston Island and Greenwich, Robert, Snow and Smith Islands. Scale 1:120000 topographic map. Troyan: Manfred Wörner Foundation, 2009. ISBN 978-954-92032-6-4
