= Nevlya Peak =

Mountain in Greenwich Island, South Shetland Islands, Antarctica

Location of Greenwich Island in the South Shetland Islands.

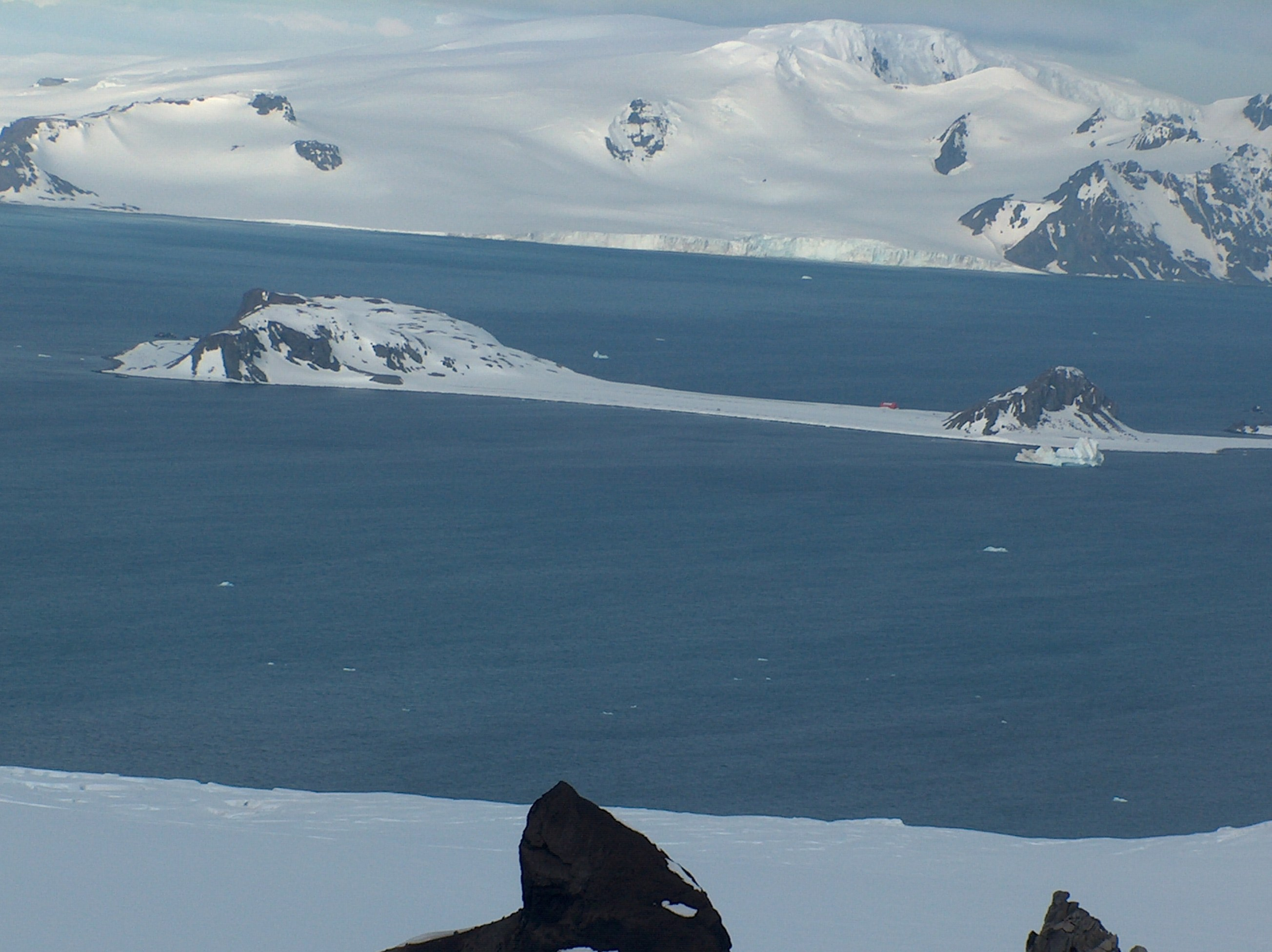
Nevlya Peak (with its partly ice-free south slope surmounting Wulfila Glacier in the central background) from near Ravda Peak, Livingston Island.

Topographic map of Livingston Island, Greenwich, Robert, Snow and Smith Islands.

Nevlya Peak (Bulgarian: връх Невля, romanized: vrah Nevlya, IPA: [ˈvrɤx ˈnɛvʎɐ]) is an ice-covered peak rising to 390 m in Breznik Heights on Greenwich Island in the South Shetland Islands, Antarctica. Situated 620 m west of Terter Peak, 1.64 km north-northwest of the summit of Ephraim Bluff, 1.15 km east-southeast of the summit of Oborishte Ridge and 1.35 km east of Salash Nunatak. Overlooking Wulfila Glacier to the west and south.

The peak is named after the settlement of Dolna (Lower) Nevlya in western Bulgaria.

== Location ==
Nevlya Peak is located at 62°32′18″S 59°43′47″W. Bulgarian topographic survey Tangra 2004/05 and mapping in 2009.

== Map ==
L.L. Ivanov. Antarctica: Livingston Island and Greenwich, Robert, Snow and Smith Islands. Scale 1:120000 topographic map. Troyan: Manfred Wörner Foundation, 2009. ISBN 978-954-92032-6-4
