= Salash Nunatak =

Rocky peak near Antarctica

Location of Greenwich Island in the South Shetland Islands.

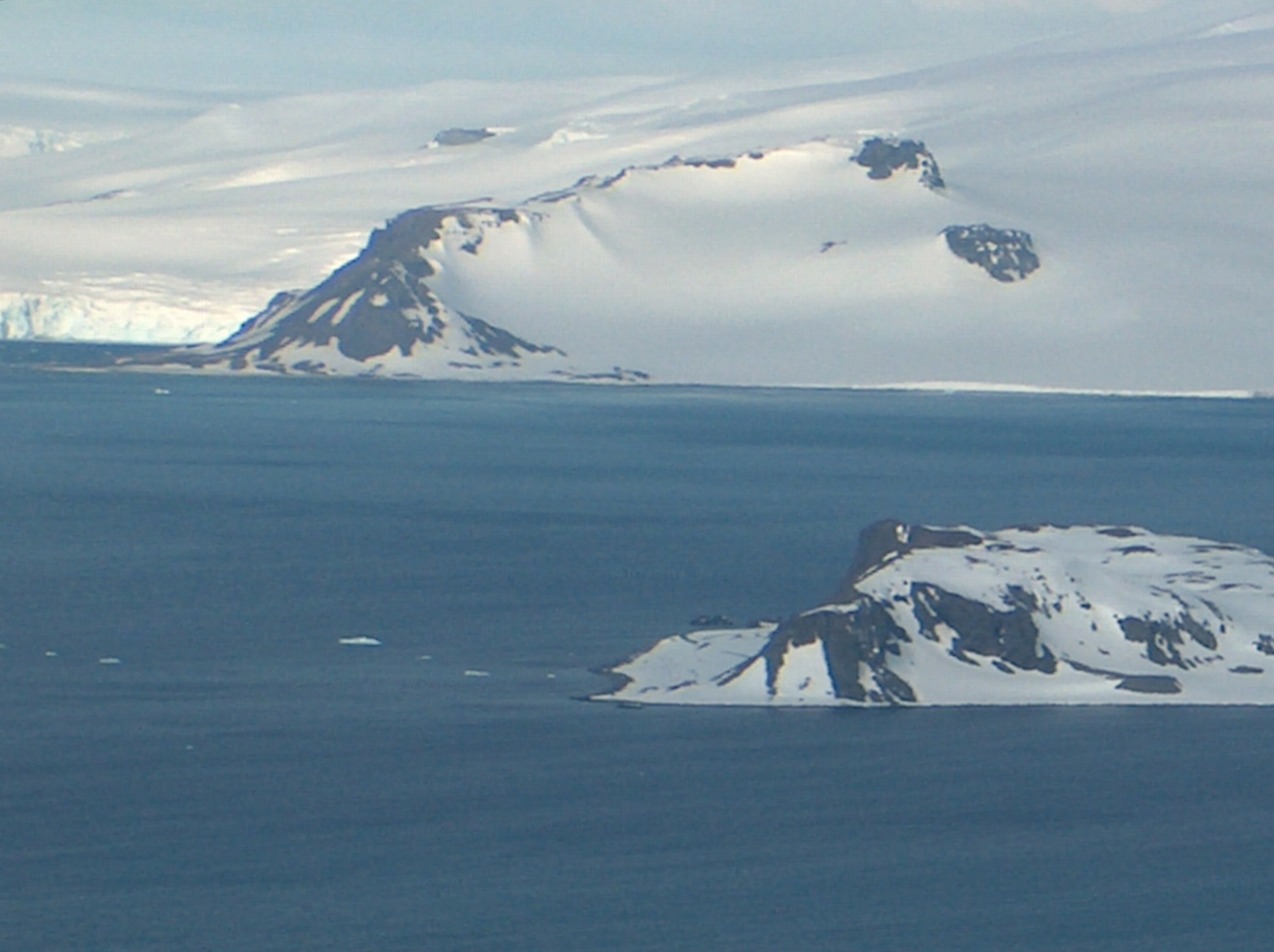
Salash Nunatak (on the right) from near Ravda Peak, Livingston Island.

Topographic map of Livingston Island, Greenwich, Robert, Snow and Smith Islands.

Salash Nunatak (Bulgarian: нунатак Салаш, ‘Nunatak Salash’ \'nu-na-tak 'sa-lash\) is a rocky peak of elevation 220 m in Breznik Heights projecting from the upper Wulfila Glacier on Greenwich Island in the South Shetland Islands, Antarctica. Situated 400 m southwest of the summit of Oborishte Ridge and 1.35 km west of Nevlya Peak.

The peak is named after the settlement of Salash in northwestern Bulgaria.

== Location ==
Salash Nunatak is located at 62°32′14.3″S 59°45′21″W. Bulgarian topographic survey Tangra 2004/05 and mapping in 2009.

== Map ==
L.L. Ivanov. Antarctica: Livingston Island and Greenwich, Robert, Snow and Smith Islands. Scale 1:120000 topographic map. Troyan: Manfred Wörner Foundation, 2009. ISBN 978-954-92032-6-4
