= Terter Peak =

Ice-covered peak in the South Shetland Islands, Antarctica

Location of Greenwich Island in the South Shetland Islands.

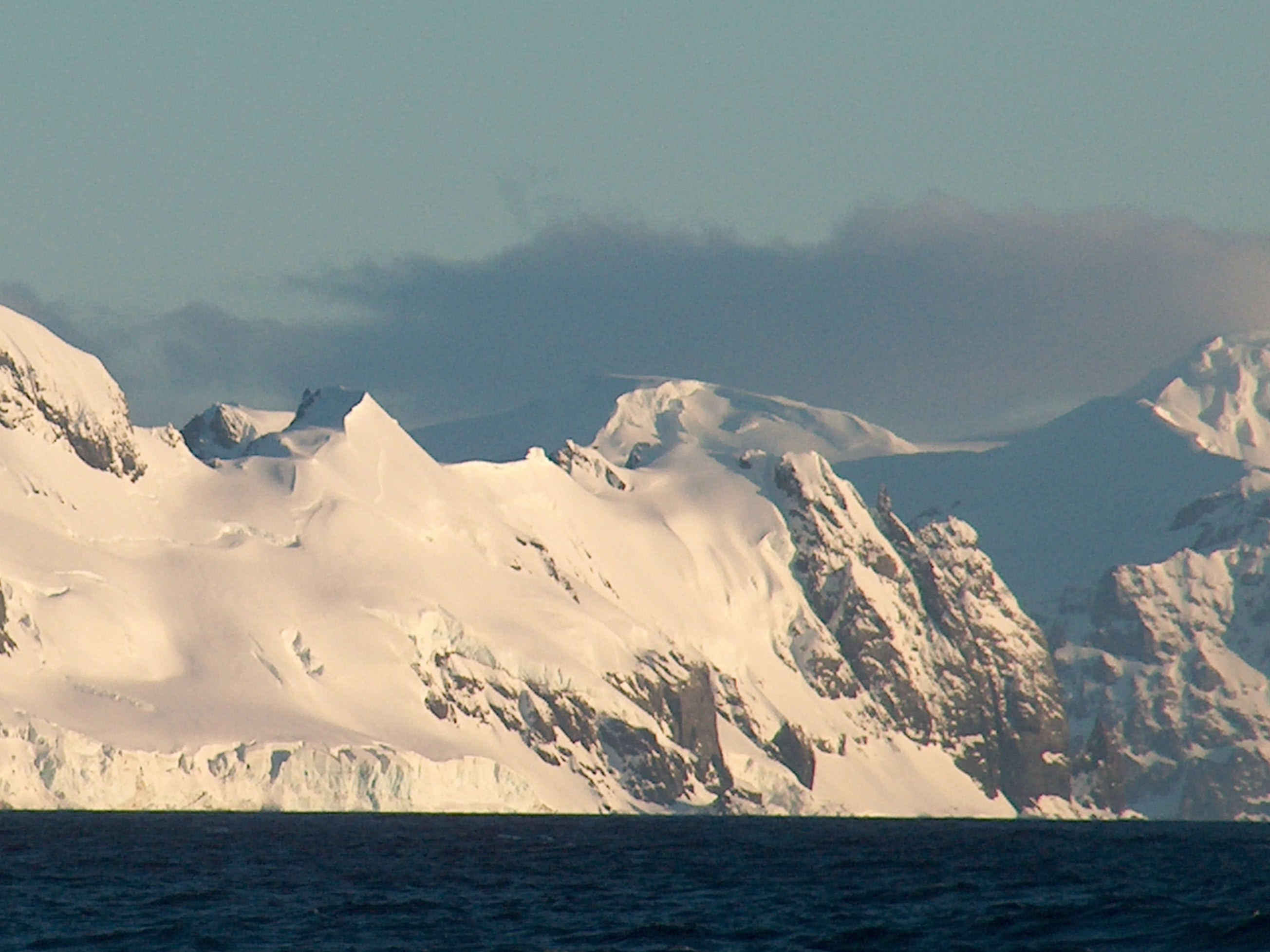
Terter Peak in the background, Bransfield Strait and the east extremity of Livingston Island in the foreground.

Topographic map of Livingston Island, Greenwich, Robert, Snow and Smith Islands.

Terter Peak (Bulgarian: връх Тертер, romanized: vrah Terter, IPA: [ˈvrɤx ˈtɛrtɛr]) is an ice-covered peak rising to 570 m in Breznik Heights, Greenwich Island in the South Shetland Islands, Antarctica surmounting Wulfila Glacier to the southwest, Solis Glacier to the northwest and Zheravna Glacier to the southeast.

== Location ==
The peak is located at 62°32′18″S 59°43′03″W, which is 740 m northwest of Razgrad Peak, 1.77 km east-southeast of the summit of Oborishte Ridge, 3.61 km south of Correa Point, 1.77 km west-southwest of Momchil Peak and 2.07 km north of the coastal point formed by Ephraim Bluff (Bulgarian topographic survey Tangra 2004/05).

The peak is named after Czar Svetoslav Terter of Bulgaria, 1300-1321 AD.

== Maps ==
- L.L. Ivanov et al. Antarctica: Livingston Island and Greenwich Island, South Shetland Islands. Scale 1:100000 topographic map. Sofia: Antarctic Place-names Commission of Bulgaria, 2005.
- L.L. Ivanov. Antarctica: Livingston Island and Greenwich, Robert, Snow and Smith Islands. Scale 1:120000 topographic map. Troyan: Manfred Wörner Foundation, 2009. ISBN 978-954-92032-6-4
