= Angamos =

Angamos may refer to:

- Angamos Hill, in the South Shetland Islands
- Angamos Island, in South Chile
- Angamos, Requena, capital of Yaquerana District, Peru
- Angamos metro station, in Lima, Peru
- Punta Angamos, a peninsula near Mejillones, Chile
- Battle of Angamos, a decisive naval battle during the War of the Pacific, fought off Punta Angamos
- Transporter Angamos (1890), a ship of the Chilean Navy, sunk in 1928
- BAP Angamos (SS-31), a submarine of the Peruvian Navy
