= Wulfila Glacier =

Glacier in Antarctica

- Location of Greenwich Island in the South Shetland Islands

- Location within South Shetland Islands Location within Antarctica
- Location: Greenwich Island; South Shetland Islands
- Coordinates: 62°32′39″S 59°44′32″W
- Length: 1.6 nmi (3 km; 2 mi)
- Width: 1 nmi (2 km; 1 mi)
- Thickness: unknown
- Terminus: McFarlane Strait
- Status: unknown

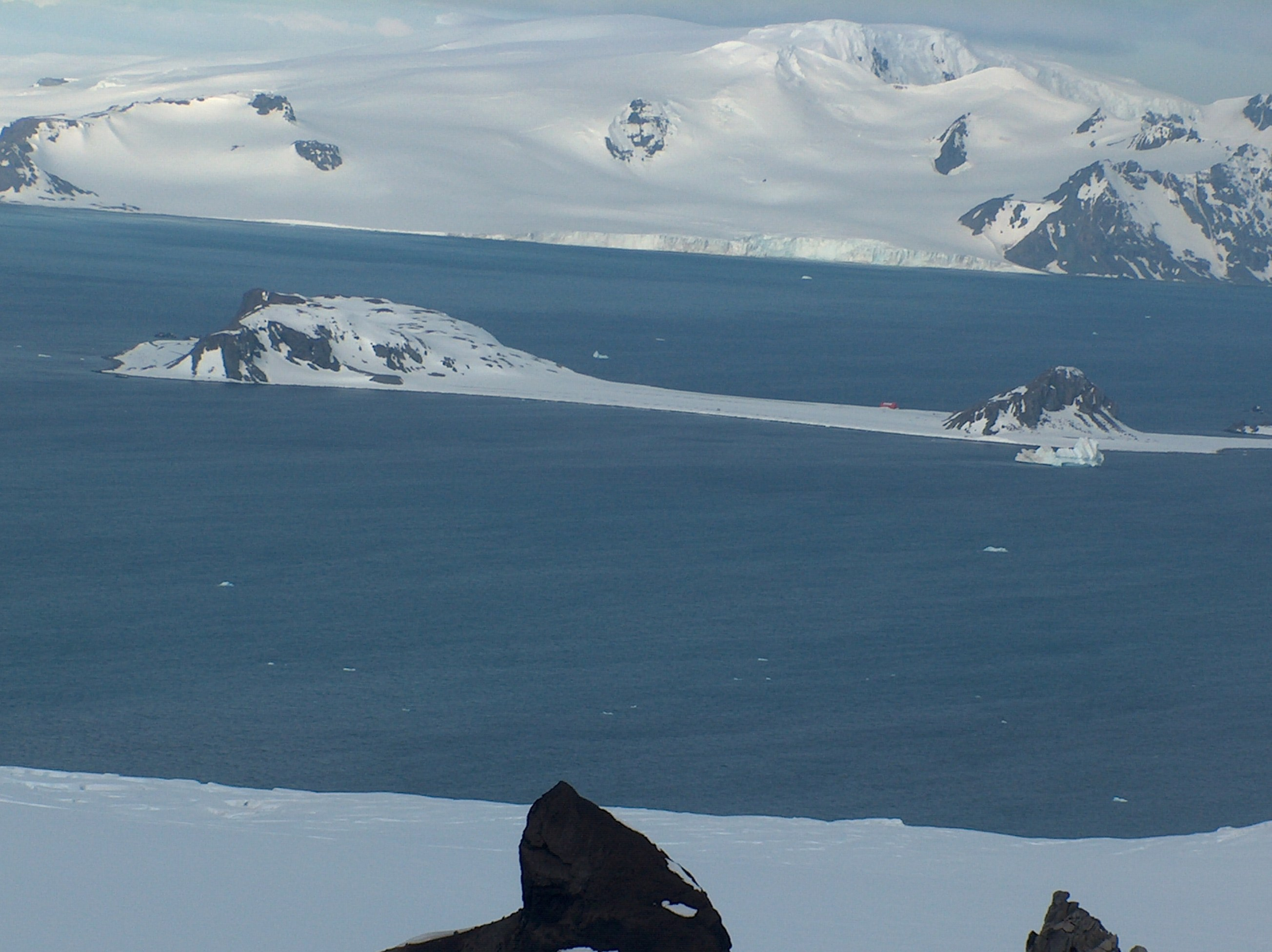
Wulfila Glacier (in the background) from near Ravda Peak, Livingston Island.

Topographic map of Livingston Island, Greenwich, Robert, Snow and Smith Islands.

Wulfila Glacier (Bulgarian: ледник Вулфила, romanized: lednik Vulfila, IPA: [ˈlɛdniɡ voɫˈfiɫɐ]) is located on the southern slopes of Breznik Heights, Greenwich Island in the South Shetland Islands, Antarctica, south-southwest of Solis Glacier and west of Zheravna Glacier. It is bounded by Oborishte Ridge to the northwest, Nevlya Peak to the north, Terter Peak and Razgrad Peak to the northeast, and Ephraim Bluff to the southeast. The glacier extends 3 km in northwest–southeast direction and 2 km in northeast–southwest direction. It drains southwestwards into McFarlane Strait between Ephraim Bluff and the base of Provadiya Hook, feeding the head of Doris Cove.

The feature is named after Bishop Wulfila (311-383 AD) of Nicopolis ad Istrum (the present Bulgarian settlement of Nikyup near Veliko Tarnovo) who created the Gothic alphabet, and laid the foundations of the Germanic literature.

== Location ==
Wulfila Glacier is centred at 62°32′39″S 59°44′32″W (Bulgarian survey Tangra 2004/05 and mapping in 2005 and 2009).

== See also ==
- Breznik Heights
- Greenwich Island
- List of glaciers in the Antarctic
- Glaciology

== Maps ==
- South Shetland Islands. Scale 1:200000 topographic map. DOS 610 Sheet W 62 58. Tolworth, UK, 1968.
- South Shetland Islands. Scale 1:200000 topographic map. DOS 610 Sheet W 62 60. Tolworth, UK, 1968.
- L.L. Ivanov et al. Antarctica: Livingston Island and Greenwich Island, South Shetland Islands. Scale 1:100000 topographic map. Sofia: Antarctic Place-names Commission of Bulgaria, 2005.
- L.L. Ivanov. Antarctica: Livingston Island and Greenwich, Robert, Snow and Smith Islands. Scale 1:120000 topographic map. Troyan: Manfred Wörner Foundation, 2009. ISBN 978-954-92032-6-4
- Antarctic Digital Database (ADD). Scale 1:250000 topographic map of Antarctica. Scientific Committee on Antarctic Research (SCAR). Since 1993, regularly updated.
- L.L. Ivanov. Antarctica: Livingston Island and Smith Island. Scale 1:100000 topographic map. Manfred Wörner Foundation, 2017. ISBN 978-619-90008-3-0
