= Targovishte Glacier =

Glacier in Antarctica

- Location of Greenwich Island in the South Shetland Islands

- Location within South Shetland Islands Location within Antarctica
- Location: Greenwich Island; South Shetland Islands
- Coordinates: 62°32′53″S 59°38′26″W
- Length: 0.8 nmi (1 km; 1 mi)
- Width: 0.4 nmi (1 km; 0 mi)
- Thickness: unknown
- Terminus: north east of Sartorius Point
- Status: unknown

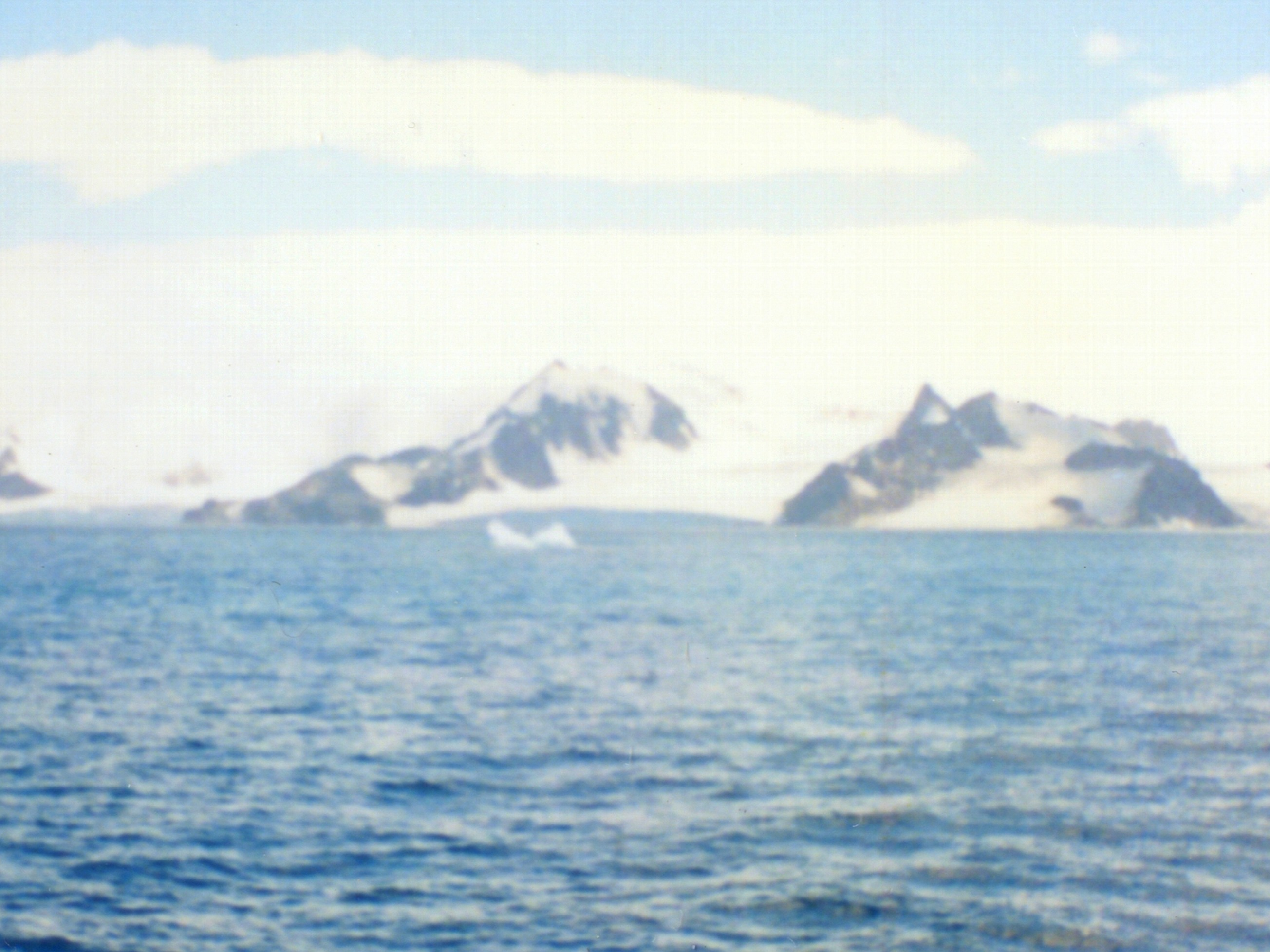
Targovishte Glacier from Bransfield Strait.

Targovishte Glacier (Bulgarian: ледник Търговище, romanized: lednik Targovishte, IPA: [ˈlɛdnik tɐrˈɡɔviʃtɛ]) is situated in Breznik Heights on Greenwich Island in the South Shetland Islands, Antarctica, east of Zheravna Glacier and southwest of Musala Glacier. It is bounded by Viskyar Ridge to the west, Vratsa Peak to the northeast, and Drangov Peak and Ziezi Peak to the east, extending 700 m in east-west direction and 1.6 km in north-south direction, and draining southwards into Bransfield Strait northeast of Sartorius Point.

The glacier is named after the city of Targovishte in northeastern Bulgaria.

== See also ==
- List of glaciers in the Antarctic
- Glaciology

== Location ==
Targovishte Glacier is centred at 62°32′53″S 59°38′26″W (Bulgarian mapping in 2005 and 2009).

== Maps ==
- L.L. Ivanov et al. Antarctica: Livingston Island and Greenwich Island, South Shetland Islands. Scale 1:100000 topographic map. Sofia: Antarctic Place-names Commission of Bulgaria, 2005.
- L.L. Ivanov. Antarctica: Livingston Island and Greenwich, Robert, Snow and Smith Islands. Scale 1:120000 topographic map. Troyan: Manfred Wörner Foundation, 2009.
