= Berende =

Berende may refer to:

- Berendei, a Pecheneg tribe
- Berende, Pernik Province, a village in Bulgaria
- Berende, Sofia Province, a village in Bulgaria
- Berende Izvor, a village in Bulgaria
