= Berende Cove =

Cove in the South Shetland Islands, Antarctica

Location of Greenwich Island in the South Shetland Islands.

Topographic map of Livingston Island, Greenwich, Robert, Snow and Smith Islands.

Berende Cove (Bulgarian: залив Беренде, romanized: zaliv Berende, IPA: [ˈzaliv bɛrɛnˈdɛ]) is the 3.3 km wide cove indenting for 1.15 km the southwest coast of Greenwich Island in the South Shetland Islands, Antarctica. Entered south of Pelishat Point.

The cove is named after the settlements of Berende in western Bulgaria.

== Location ==
Berende Cove is located at 62°28′25″S 59°58′35″W. Bulgarian mapping in 2009.

== Map ==
- L.L. Ivanov. Antarctica: Livingston Island and Greenwich, Robert, Snow and Smith Islands. Scale 1:120000 topographic map. Troyan: Manfred Wörner Foundation, 2009. ISBN 978-954-92032-6-4
