= Momchil Peak =

Mountain in Greenwich Island, South Shetland Islands, Antarctica

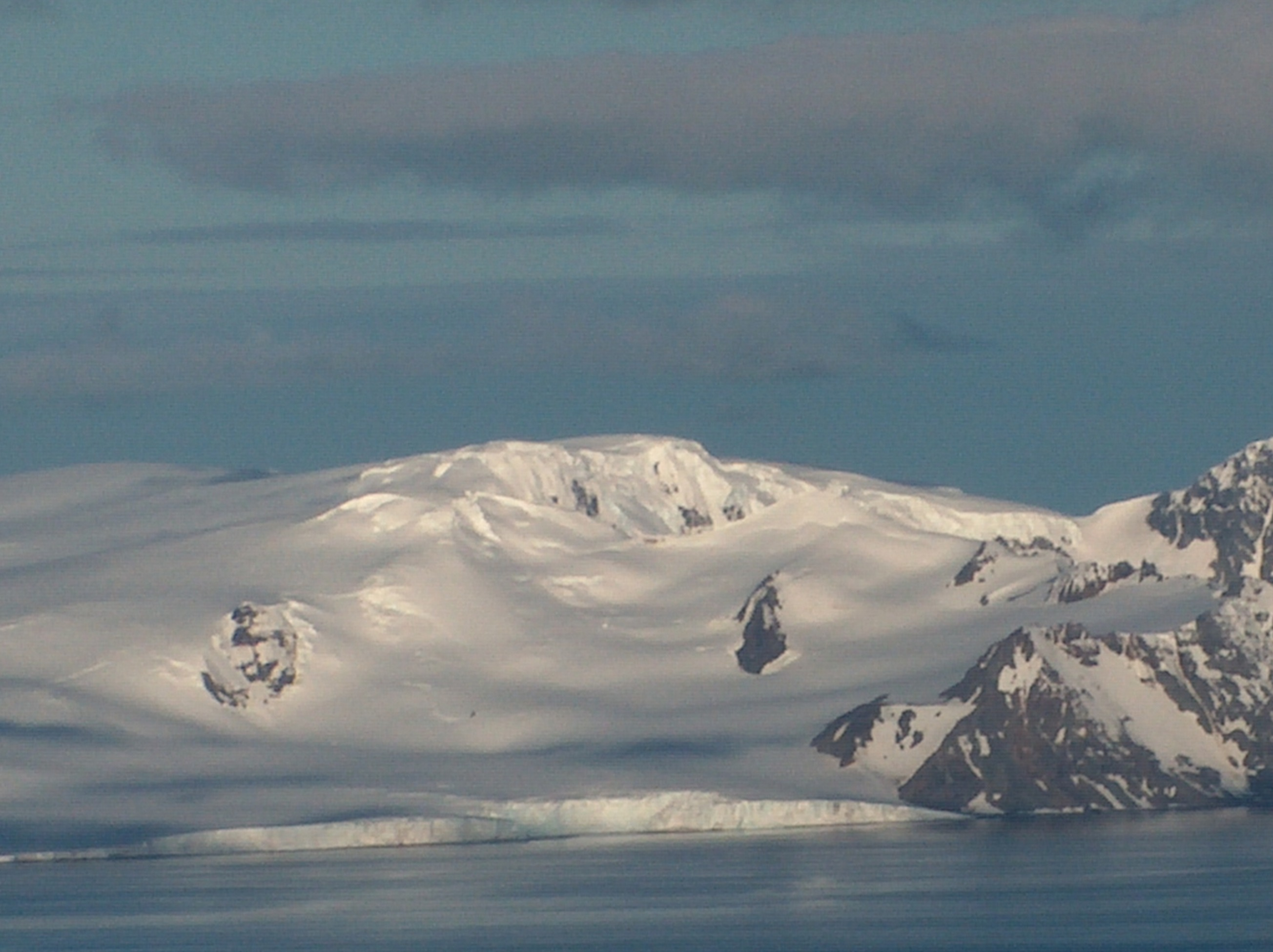
- Momchil Peak from near Lozen Saddle, Livingston Island

Highest point
- Elevation: 620 m (2,030 ft)
- Prominence: 620 m (2,030 ft)
- Coordinates: 62°32′10″S 59°41′02″W

Geography
- Location: Greenwich Island, Antarctica

Location of Greenwich Island in the South Shetland Islands.

Topographic map of Livingston Island, Greenwich, Robert, Snow and Smith Islands.

Momchil Peak (Bulgarian: Момчилов връх) is an ice-covered peak rising to 625 m in Breznik Heights, Greenwich Island in the South Shetland Islands, Antarctica. The peak is located north of Zheravna Glacier, 590 m east of Ilinden Peak, 1.7 km northeast of Razgrad Peak, 1.49 km northwest of the summit of Viskyar Ridge and 3.08 km north-northwest of Sartorius Point (Bulgarian topographic survey Tangra 2004/05 and mapping in 2005 and 2009).

The peak is named after the Bulgarian town of Momchilgrad in association with Momchil, a Bulgarian ruler of Aegean Thrace in the 14th century.

== Maps ==
- L.L. Ivanov et al. Antarctica: Livingston Island and Greenwich Island, South Shetland Islands. Scale 1:100000 topographic map. Sofia: Antarctic Place-names Commission of Bulgaria, 2005.
- L.L. Ivanov. Antarctica: Livingston Island and Greenwich, Robert, Snow and Smith Islands. Scale 1:120000 topographic map. Troyan: Manfred Wörner Foundation, 2009. ISBN 978-954-92032-6-4
