= Pelishat Point =

Point in the South Shetland Islands

Location of Greenwich Island in the South Shetland Islands.

Topographic map of Livingston Island, Greenwich, Robert, Snow and Smith Islands.

Pelishat Point (Bulgarian: нос Пелишат, ‘Nos Pelishat’ \'nos 'pe-li-shat\) is the point forming the south extremity of Archar Peninsula and the north side of the entrance to Berende Cove on the southwest coast of Greenwich Island in the South Shetland Islands, Antarctica. It is situated 2.4 km southeast of Duff Point and 3.9 km northeast of Pomorie Point on Livingston Island.

The point is named after the settlement of Pelishat in northern Bulgaria.

== Location ==
Pelishat Point is located at 62°27′59″S 60°00′02″W. Bulgarian mapping in 2009.

== Maps ==
- L.L. Ivanov. Antarctica: Livingston Island and Greenwich, Robert, Snow and Smith Islands. Scale 1:120000 topographic map. Troyan: Manfred Wörner Foundation, 2009. ISBN 978-954-92032-6-4
