= Razgrad Peak =

Mountain in Greenwich Island, Antarctica

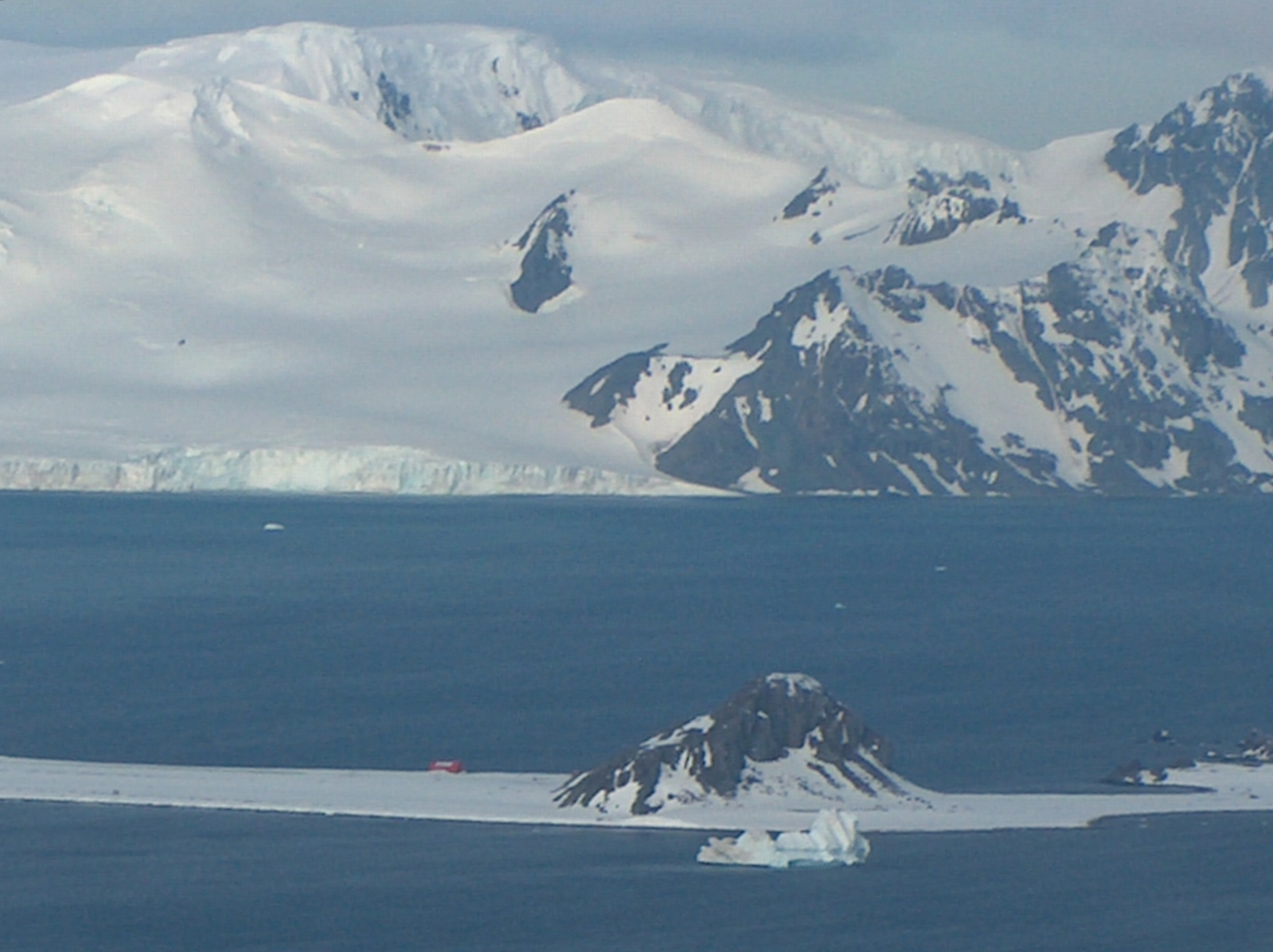
- Razgrad Peak from Kuzman Knoll, with Half Moon Island in the foreground

Highest point
- Elevation: 550 m (1,800 ft)
- Coordinates: 62°32′39″S 59°42′38″W

Geography
- Location: Greenwich Island, Antarctica

Location of Greenwich Island in the South Shetland Islands.

Topographic map of Livingston Island, Greenwich, Robert, Snow and Smith Islands.

Razgrad Peak (Bulgarian: връх Разград, romanized: vrah Razgrad, IPA: [ˈvrɤx ˈrazɡrɐt]) is an ice-covered peak rising to 550 m in Breznik Heights, Greenwich Island, Antarctica. The peak is located 740 m southeast of Terter Peak, 1.7 km southwest of Momchil Peak, 2.7 km west of the summit of Viskyar Ridge, and 1.51 km north-northeast of the coastal point formed by Ephraim Bluff (Bulgarian topographic survey Tangra 2004/05). An eastern offshoot of the peak is forming Maystora Peak. Surmounting Zheravna Glacier to the east and Wulfila Glacier to the west.

The peak is named after the city of Razgrad in Northeastern Bulgaria.

== Maps ==
- L.L. Ivanov et al. Antarctica: Livingston Island and Greenwich Island, South Shetland Islands. Scale 1:100000 topographic map. Sofia: Antarctic Place-names Commission of Bulgaria, 2005.
- L.L. Ivanov. Antarctica: Livingston Island and Greenwich, Robert, Snow and Smith Islands. Scale 1:120000 topographic map. Troyan: Manfred Wörner Foundation, 2009. ISBN 978-954-92032-6-4
