= Doris Cove =

Antarctic cove

Location of Greenwich Island in the South Shetland Islands

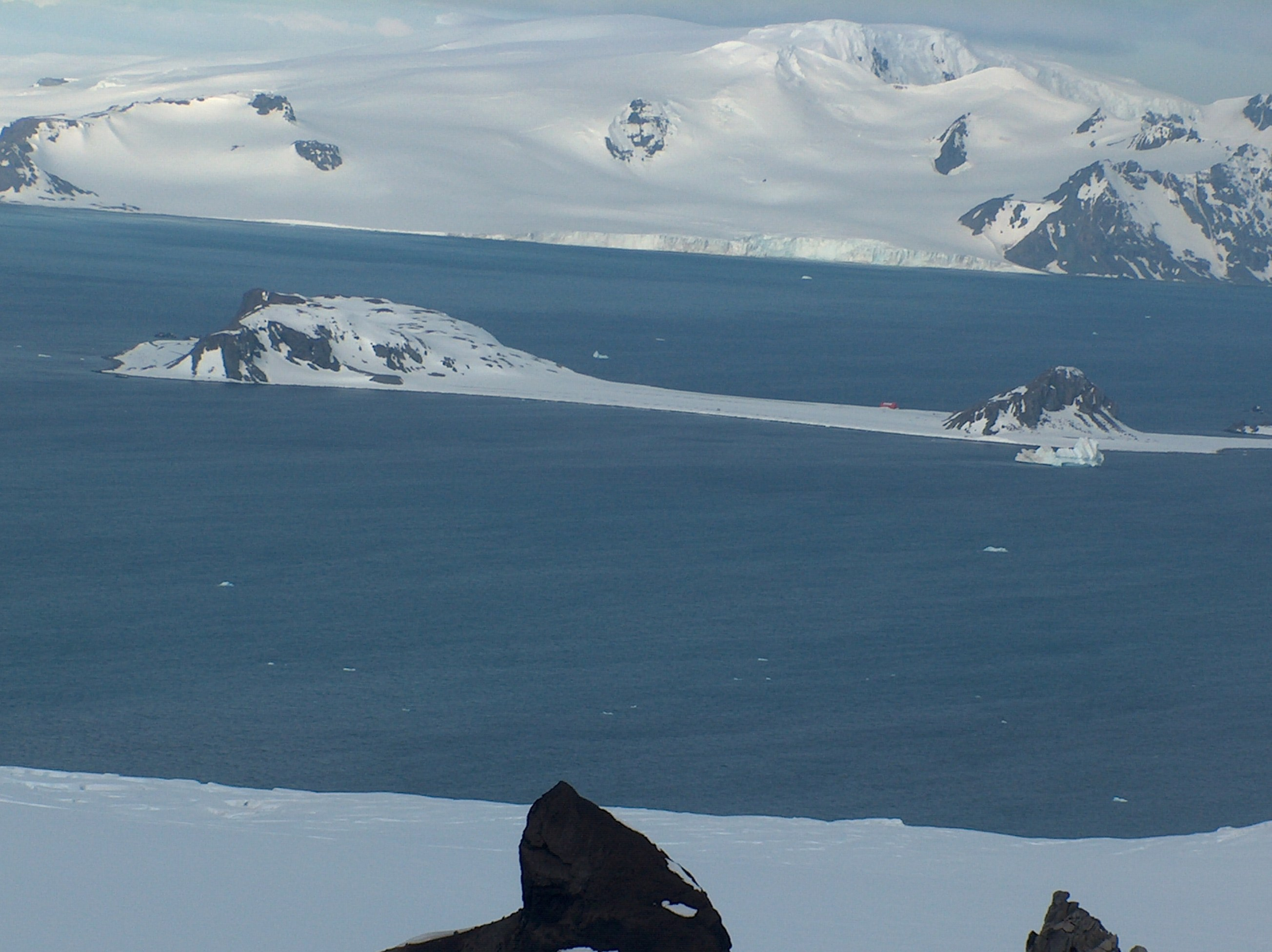
Wulfila Glacier (in the background) from Livingston Island in 2004

Topographic map of Livingston, Greenwich, Robert, Snow and Smith Islands

Doris Cove (Bulgarian: залив Дорис, romanized: zaliv Doris, IPA: [ˈzalif ˈdɔris]) is the 1.3 km wide cove indenting for 600 m the southwest coast of Greenwich Island in the South Shetland Islands, Antarctica south of Oborishte Ridge and northwest of Ephraim Bluff. It is formed as a result of the retreat of Wulfila Glacier in the first two decades of 21st century. Bulgarian topographic survey Tangra 2004/05. The area was visited by early 19th century sealers.

The feature is named after the sea goddess Doris in Greek mythology.

== Location ==
Doris Cove is centred at 62°32′38″S 59°45′10″W. Bulgarian mapping in 2009.

== Maps ==
- L. Ivanov. Antarctica: Livingston Island and Greenwich, Robert, Snow and Smith Islands. Scale 1:120000 topographic map. Troyan: Manfred Wörner Foundation, 2009. ISBN 978-954-92032-6-4
- Antarctic Digital Database (ADD). Scale 1:250000 topographic map of Antarctica. Scientific Committee on Antarctic Research (SCAR). Since 1993, regularly upgraded and updated
