= Landscape from Tsarigrad =

1926 painting by Vladimir Dimitrov

- Пейзаж от Цариград (Bulgarian)
- Artist: Vladimir Dimitrov
- Year: 1926
- Type: water on cardboard
- Dimensions: 69 cm × 99.2 cm (27 in × 39.1 in)
- Location: National Art Gallery (Bulgaria)

Landscape from Tsarigrad (Bulgarian: Пейзаж от Цариград) is a watercolor by Vladimir Dimitrov, from 1926.

== Description ==
The water color on cardboard's dimensions are 69 x 99.2 centimeters. It is in the collection of the National Art Gallery, in Sofia.

== Analysis ==
It depicts the skyline of Istanbul.

In 2010, it was a part of "The Faces of Modernism – Painting in Bulgaria, Greece and Romania, 1910-1940" exhibit.
