= Vladimir Dimitrov =

Bulgarian painter and teacher

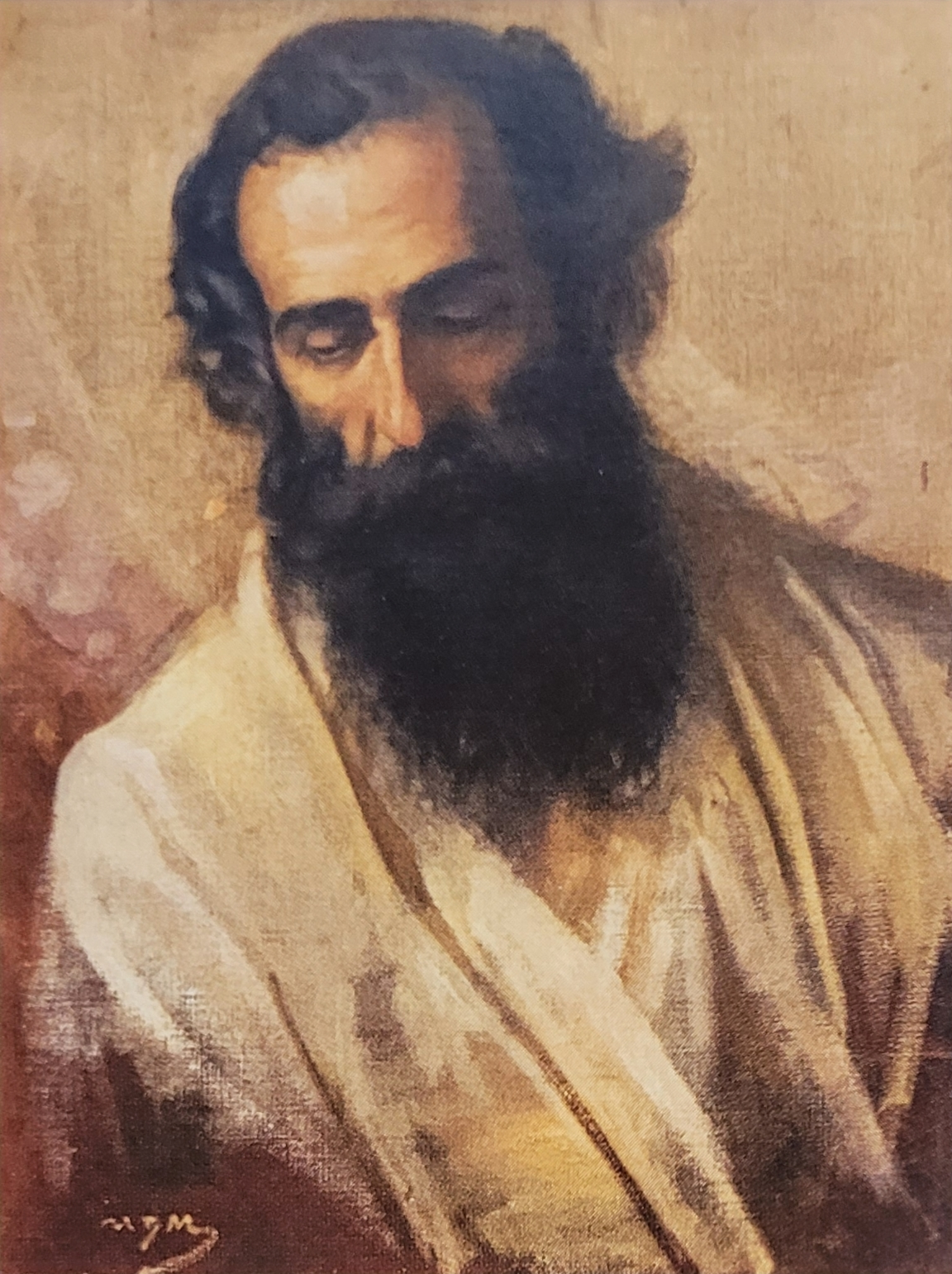
- Portrait by Ivan Mrkvička, c. 1909
- Born: 1 February 1882; Frolosh, Kyustendil, Bulgaria
- Died: 24 September 1960 (aged 78); Sofia, Bulgaria
- Other name: The Master
- Known for: Painter

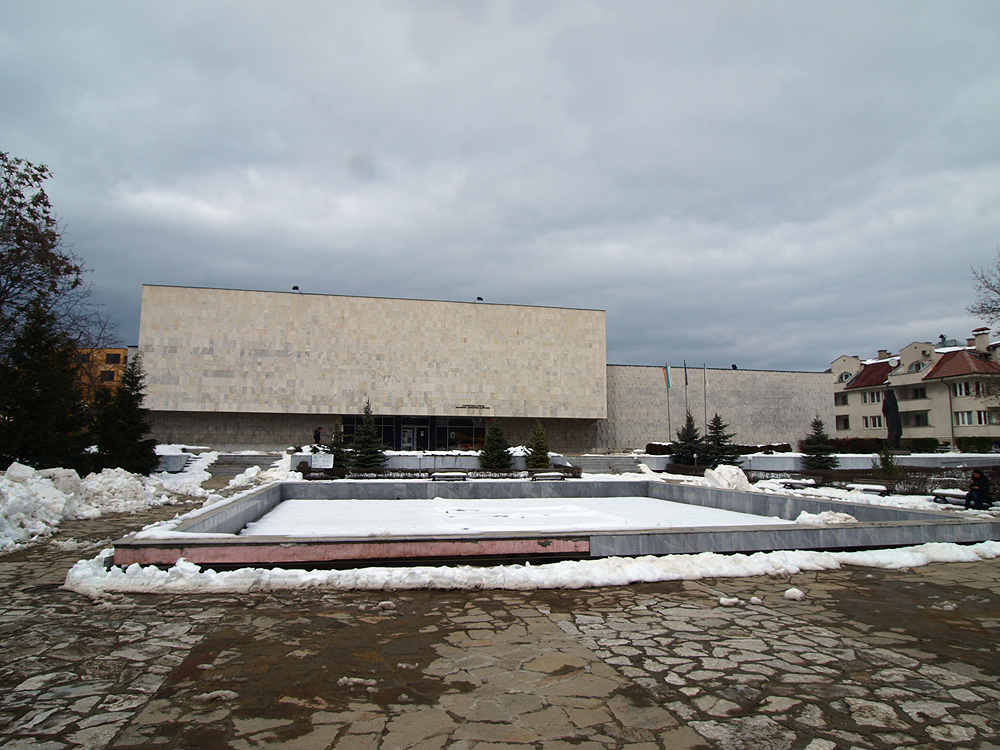
Vladimir Dimitrov Art Gallery in Kyustendil

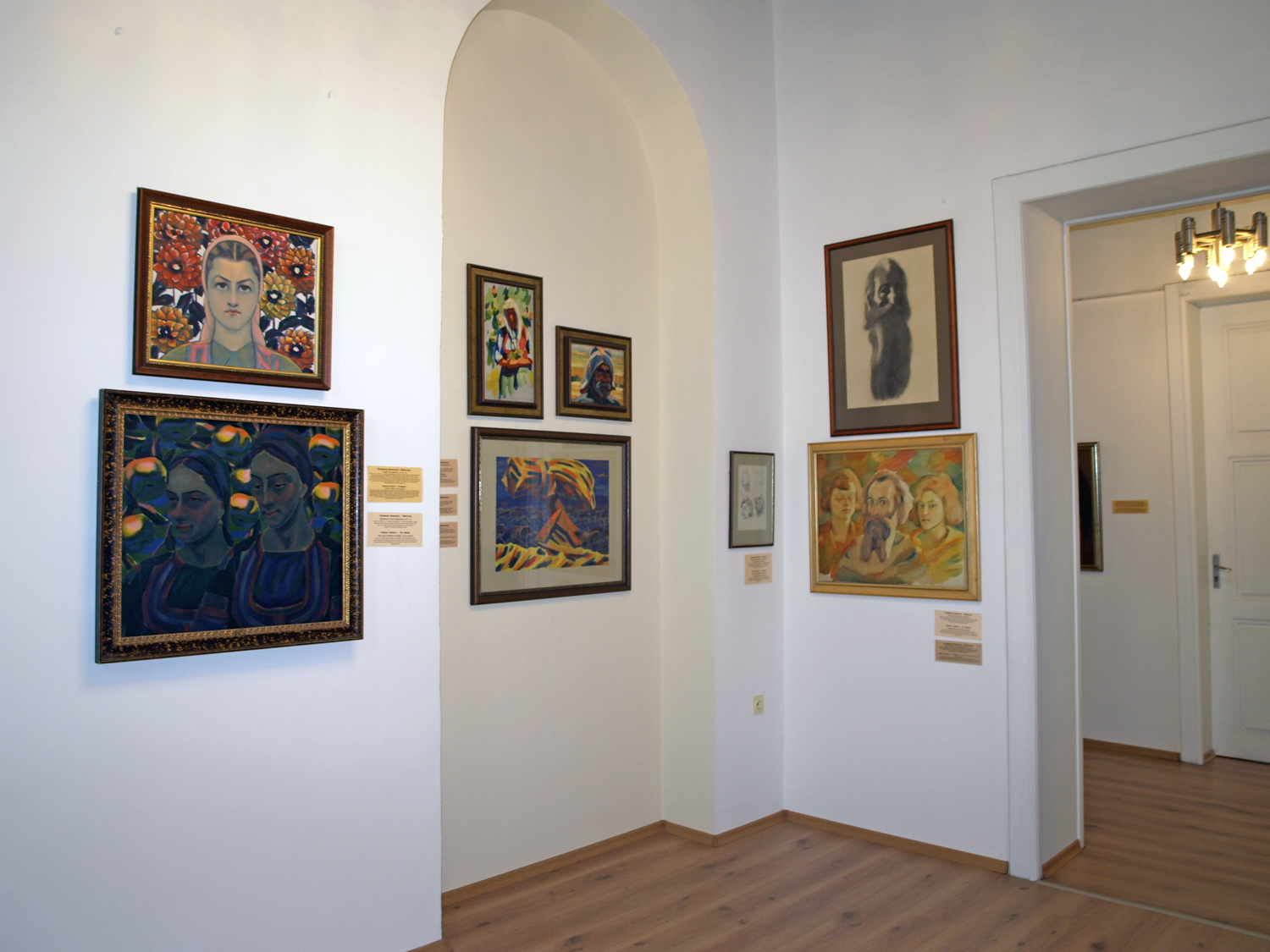
Vladimir Dimitrov Works in Plovdiv Gallery of Fine Arts

Vladimir "the Master/Maystora" Dimitrov Poppetrov (Bulgarian: Владимир "Майстора" Димитров Поппетров; 1 February 1882 – 29 September 1960) was a Bulgarian painter, draughtsman and teacher. He is considered one of the most talented 20th century Bulgarian painters and probably the most remarkable stylist in Bulgarian painting in the post-Russo-Turkish War era.

== Life and work ==
Vladimir Dimitrov was born in Frolosh, near Kyustendil and started his career as a clerk. In 1903 he enrolled in the School of Drawing in Sofia where he had been called the Master (Maystora) for the first time. In 1922 he met the American John Crane in Rome and sold him much of his work for the next few years. In the period before and after the First World War he travelled extensively, visited Russia, Italy, France, Germany and the USA. After that he spent almost all of his life in the village of Shishkovtsi.

Dimitrov is famous not solely because of his paintings but also because of his lifestyle. His family was poor but even after he became famous, he was trying to give away all of his possessions and money, living in poverty and asceticism, wearing old clothes, never shaving and eating only vegetarian food. This is the reason why even while alive, many people believed that he was a saint and showed great affection for him.

Dimitrov was an artist who included bright colors within his art and today his artwork may be considered a fauvist type rather than expressionist. He uses a wide range of Post-Impressionist techniques, but his works always keep a strong bound with reality and try to simplify many of the figures and compositions to make them accessible for a wider public. The main strength does not come from the clarity of the images but from the colors. More than 700 of his oil paintings are exhibited in the "Vladimir Dimitrov Art Gallery" in Kyustendil.

Maystora Peak on Greenwich Island in the South Shetland Islands, Antarctica is named for the painter.

To commemorate his 100th birthday, in 1982 a set of 6 souvenir postage stamps featuring 6 of his paintings was issued.

== Social engagement ==
- 1910-1920: paints in the traditional realistic style prevalent in Europe at the time. During this period (1912–1917), he participated as "war painter" in both the Balkan Wars and First World War. It is probably due to this war experience that he becomes imbued with the spirit of Tolstoyanism.
- 1920-1930: creates the painting now called "The Bulgarian Madonna".
- 1946: joins the Communist Party.
