= Oborishte Ridge =

Ridge in the South Shetland Islands, Antarctica

Location of Greenwich Island in the South Shetland Islands.

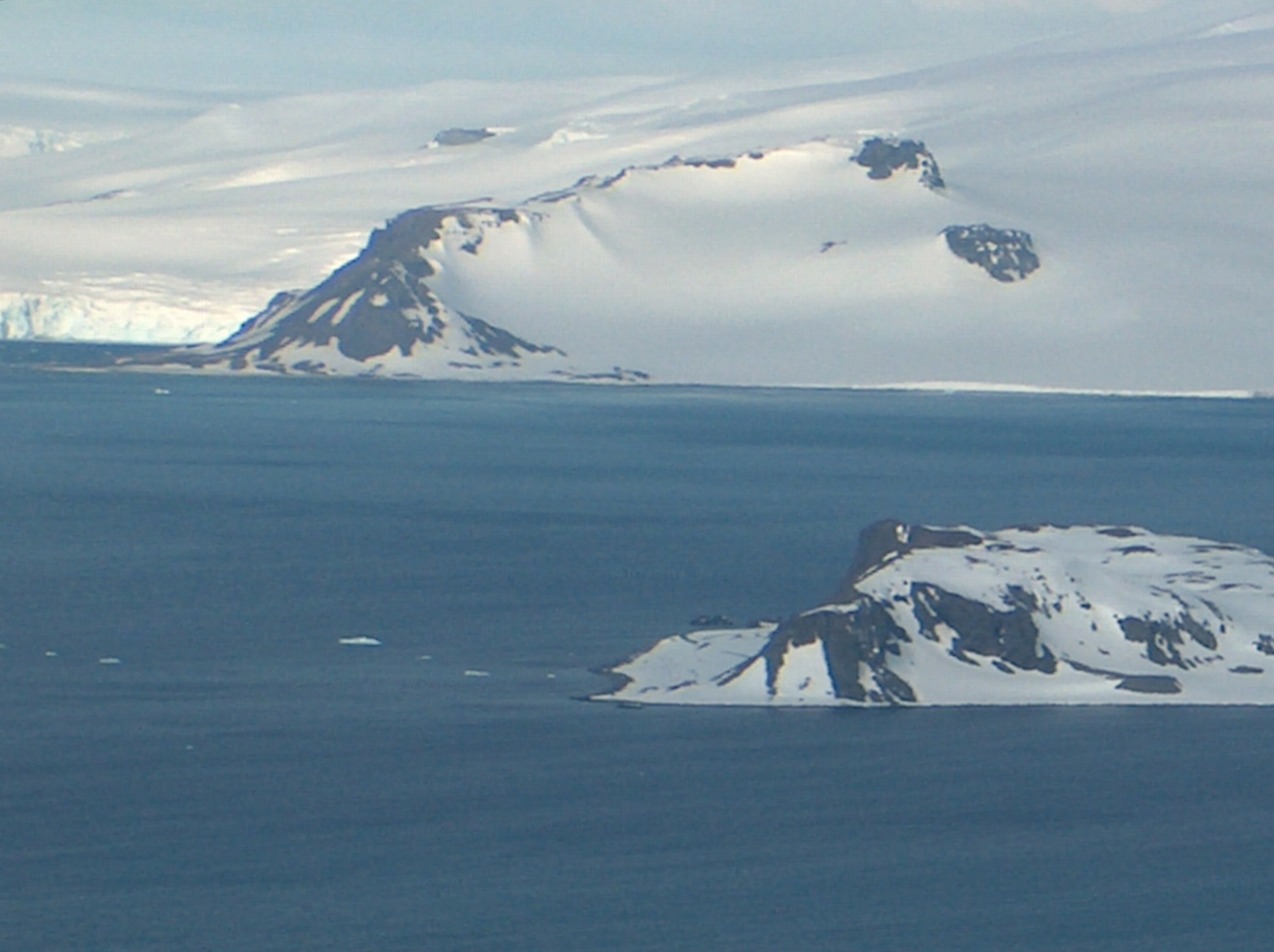
Oborishte Ridge from near Ravda Peak, Livingston Island.

Topographic map of Livingston Island, Greenwich, Robert, Snow and Smith Islands.

Oborishte Ridge (Rid Oborishte \'rid o-'bo-ri-shte\) has an elevation of 340 m in the southwest extremity of Breznik Heights, Greenwich Island in the South Shetland Islands, Antarctica. Extending 1.7 km along the southeast coast of Yankee Harbour and 950 m wide. Ice-free surface area (together with the adjoining Provadiya Hook) 138 hectares (340 acres). It surmounts Solis Glacier on the east and Wulfila Glacier on the southeast, and Yankee Harbour on the north and Doris Cove on the south.

The ridge is named after the historic site of Oborishte in central Bulgaria.

== Location ==
The summit of the ridge is located at 62°32′05″S 59°45′04″W, which is 2.17 km southeast of Spit Point, 2.54 km north-northwest of the summit of Ephraim Bluff and 1.77 km west-northwest of Terter Peak (Bulgarian topographic survey Tangra 2004/05 and mapping in 2009).

== Maps ==
- L.L. Ivanov. Antarctica: Livingston Island and Greenwich, Robert, Snow and Smith Islands. Scale 1:120000 topographic map. Troyan: Manfred Wörner Foundation, 2009. ISBN 978-954-92032-6-4
- Antarctic Digital Database (ADD). Scale 1:250000 topographic map of Antarctica. Scientific Committee on Antarctic Research (SCAR). Since 1993, regularly upgraded and updated.
- L.L. Ivanov. Antarctica: Livingston Island and Smith Island. Scale 1:100000 topographic map. Manfred Wörner Foundation, 2017. ISBN 978-619-90008-3-0
