= Poisson Hill =

Location of Greenwich Island in the South Shetland Islands.

Poisson Hill is a rounded ice-free hill rising to 80 m at the north extremity of Breznik Heights, Greenwich Island in the South Shetland Islands, Antarctica and surmounting the Chilean Antarctic base Arturo Prat to the west-southwest. Angamos Hill (55 m) is lying 370 m north-northeast of it and 850 m south-southeast of Ash Point.

Poisson Hill was charted by the 1947 Chilean Antarctic Expedition and named after Sub-Lieutenant Maurice Poisson who signed the official act of inauguration of Arturo Prat Base in 1947, while Angamos Hill was named after that expedition's transport ship Angamos.

== Location ==
Poisson Hill is located at 62°28′39″S 59°39′03″W which is 1.08 km south by east of Ash Point, 740 m northwest of López Nunatak and 700 m east-northeast of Arturo Prat Base (British mapping of the area in 1968, and Bulgarian in 2005 and 2009).

== Maps ==
- L.L. Ivanov et al. Antarctica: Livingston Island and Greenwich Island, South Shetland Islands. Scale 1:100000 topographic map. Sofia: Antarctic Place-names Commission of Bulgaria, 2005.
- L.L. Ivanov. Antarctica: Livingston Island and Greenwich, Robert, Snow and Smith Islands. Scale 1:120000 topographic map. Troyan: Manfred Wörner Foundation, 2009.
