= Berende, Pernik Province =

Berende Беренде
- Village
- Location of Berende
- Coordinates: 42°36′N 22°49′E
- Country: Bulgaria
- Province (Oblast): Pernik
- Municipality (Obshtina): Zemen
- First mentioned: 1576

Area
  - Land: 10.217 km^{2} (3.945 sq mi)
- Elevation: 800 m (2,600 ft)

Population (2020)
  - Total: 30
- Time zone: UTC+2 (EET)
  - Summer (DST): UTC+3 (EEST)
- EEST: 2435
- License plate: PK

Berende (Bulgarian: Беренде) is a village in western Bulgaria. Its located in Oblast Pernik, Obshtina Zemen.

== Geography ==
The village of Berende is located in a mountainous area. It is located in the mountain of Cherna gora, about 2 km west of Mount Tumba 1129 meters.

== History ==
The village is one of the two settlements in Bulgaria bearing this name. The other village named Berende and another with a similar Berende spring ca in the municipality of Dragoman. In antiquity the region was inhabited by various tribes, whose main livelihoods were cattle breeding and mining. During the early Middle Ages, Bulgarians settled in this area, replacing the old population. The region was included in the Bulgarian state in 809, when Sofia was conquered by Khan Krum. After 1011, the region fell under Byzantine rule, along with the conquest of the Pernik fortress, protected by Krakra of Pernik. It was briefly liberated during the uprisings of Peter Delyan in 1040–41 and Georgi Voiteh in 1071–72. In 1084, about 80,000 Pechenegs, also known as Black Bulgarians, crossed the Danube and entered the Byzantine Empire, trying to torn away the Bulgarian lands under their rule. The Byzantine troops defeated the Pechenegs and their Berendei tribe settled around today's Sofia, they were baptized in Orthodoxy and joined the local Bulgarians. Only 5 years after the restoration of Bulgarian independence in 1185 under Tsar Assen I in 1190. After the Ottoman invasion in the 14th century, the population of the surrounding plains retreated to the mountains, where they enjoyed significantly less pressure from the enslavers. Migrants from Pirot, Razmetanitsa, the valley of South Morava and from the Skopje region and Zhegligovo settled in the region. After the Liberation of Bulgaria began the gradual emigration of people to more flat places, where there is free agricultural land and to the cities, which attract with work in industry and administration and new housing.

== Events ==
- 24 May – Traditional day of the village.
