= Church of St Peter, Berende =

Church of St Peter
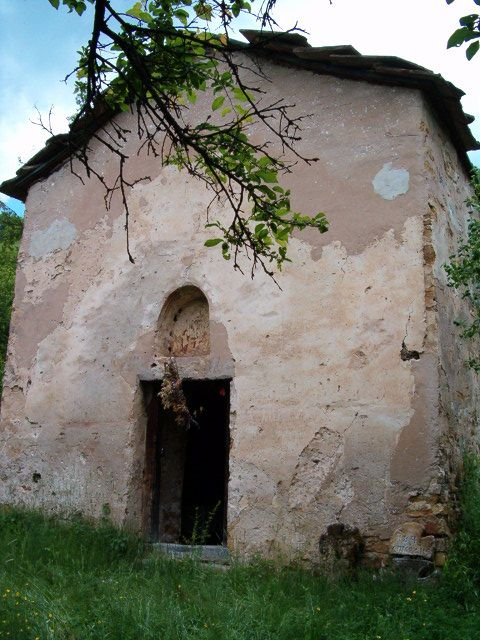
- View from the west with the entrance door

- 42°59′38″N 22°55′35″E
- Location: Berende, Sofia Province
- Country: Bulgaria
- Denomination: Bulgarian Orthodox

History
- Dedication: Saint Peter

Architecture
- Style: Byzantine
- Completed: 14th century

The Church of St Peter (Bulgarian: църква "Свети Петър"; tsarkva "Sveti Petar") or Church of Saints Peter and Paul is a small medieval Bulgarian Orthodox church located in the village of Berende in Dragoman Municipality, Sofia Province, in westernmost Bulgaria. Most likely constructed and decorated in the 14th century, the Church of St Peter features simple stone architecture but contains a number of remarkable interior frescoes.

Though located next to the village's graveyard and often interpreted as a cemetery church, the Church of St. Peter may have been in some way related to the Bulgarian royal court, as a now-lost portrait with a caption most likely referencing Bulgarian tsar Ivan Alexander was once visible on one of its exterior walls.

== History ==
The original researchers of the Church of St Peter, Karel Škorpil and Yordan Ivanov, ascribed it to the 13th century owing to a now-lost exterior mural of a person on the west wall of the church, described by one source as an image of a Bulgarian tsar. The image bears the following caption in Middle Bulgarian: "Ivan Asen, in Christ our God faithful tsar and autocrat [of all] Bulga[rians and Greeks]". Škorpil and Ivanov identified the person mentioned in the inscription as Tsar Ivan Asen II of Bulgaria (r. 1218–1241). Beginning in the 1920s and the publications of André Grabar, however, the church and its art have been usually dated to the 14th century based on stylistic and architectural similarities to other works of that period. The formula of the exterior inscription is also considered to be similar to the inscriptions of Tsar Ivan Alexander (r. 1331–1371), who is known to have used the name Ivan Asen on several other occasions.

Due to its location, the Church of St Peter is often described as a cemetery church. However, scholar Bistra Nikolova considers it improbable that an ordinary village cemetery church would have an inscription by a Bulgarian tsar. In her opinion, it is more likely that the church was constructed by a noble person related to the court of the Second Bulgarian Empire.

The Church of St Peter has been protected as a national antiquity since 1927. In 1966, it was listed as an artistic monument of culture of national importance. However, as of 2011, the frescoes have never during the church's existence undergone restoration or conservation and remain threatened. In the lowest parts, up to 0.5 m (1.6 ft) from the floor, the murals have been entirely erased by moisture. Moisture and the resulting salts have also damaged other decorated sections of the walls.

== Location and architecture ==
The Church of St Peter is 800 metres (2,600 feet) west of the village of Berende, near the banks of the Nishava River. Today, it lies within the old village graveyard. Not far from the church on the way linking it to the village is Mosta (Моста, "The Bridge"), a natural bridge rock formation.

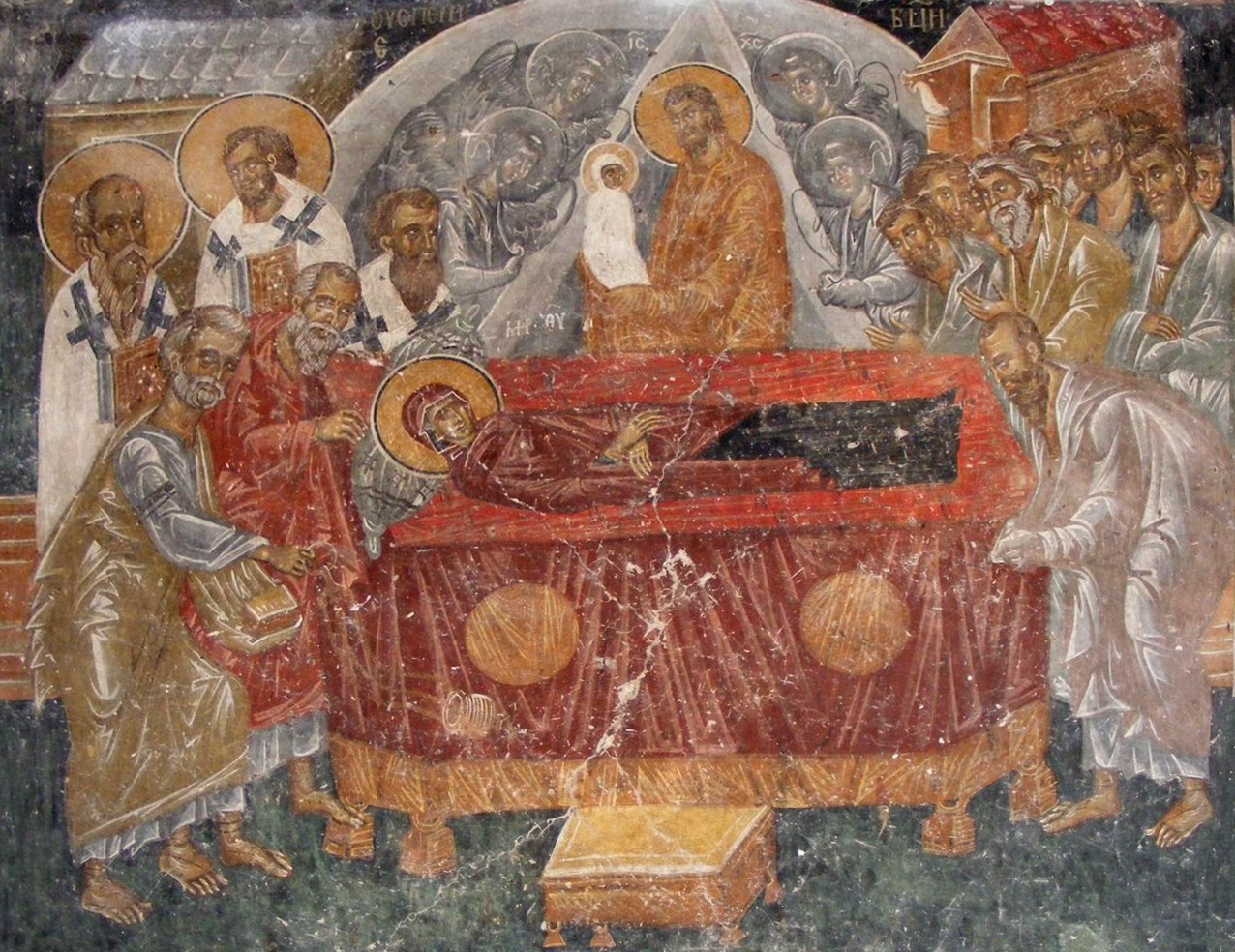
Fresco of the Dormition of the Mother of God painted above the entrance to the church

The church is a small and simple rectangular single-nave building constructed out of crushed stone; the walls range in thickness from 85 to 90 cm (33 to 35 in). It is accessible via an entrance on its west wall. The wooden door is 2 m (6.6 ft) high and is topped by a shallow semicircular niche. Apart from that niche, the only other decorative feature of its architecture are the narrow windows placed on the apse and the south wall. The apse is semicircular and attached to the church's east side. The church features a semicircular vault, and its gabled roof is made of stone slates. In terms of length and width, the church measures 5.50 m × 4.50 m (18.0 ft × 14.8 ft).

== Interior and decoration ==
The interior of the church houses an original wooden iconostasis in front of the altar. Carved in the second half of the 14th century, the iconostasis has a basic shape. It is constructed of thick beams and wooden boards, on which traces of painting are visible, and has three openings.

The entirety of the church's interior is covered with 14th-century frescoes, which are described as "particularly remarkable" in a UNESCO publication. Among the notable mural portraits is that of church patron Saint Peter, whose larger-than-life image adorns the wall next to the iconostasis. Other frescoes include that of Jesus Christ painted to the right of the apse and that of Saint Alexius next to the entrance. The middle reaches of the walls feature images from the Holy Week, with frescoes depicting events from other major holidays above them. The conch of the apse boasts an image of the Mother of God; portraits of various saints and scenes from the Ascension of Jesus and the Annunciation complete the decoration of the apse.

Next to the apse is a mural of Saint Cyril of Alexandria, captioned as "Saint Cyril the Philosopher", the 9th-century missionary to the Slavs. Although the position and iconography of the portrait clearly identify it as an image of Cyril of Alexandria, the caption hints that the local population confused the two saints and Cyril the Philosopher was still well-remembered at the time. Other images painted in the church include these of the Dormition of the Mother of God (above the entrance), the Transfiguration of Jesus (under the vault), John Damascene, Cosmas of Maiuma, Archangel Michael (south of the entrance), Saint Constantine and Saint Helena (right of the entrance).

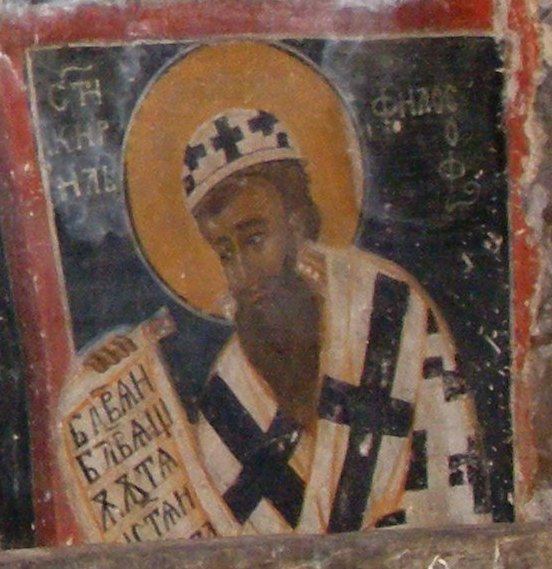
Cyril of Alexandria miscaptioned as "Saint Cyril the Philosopher"

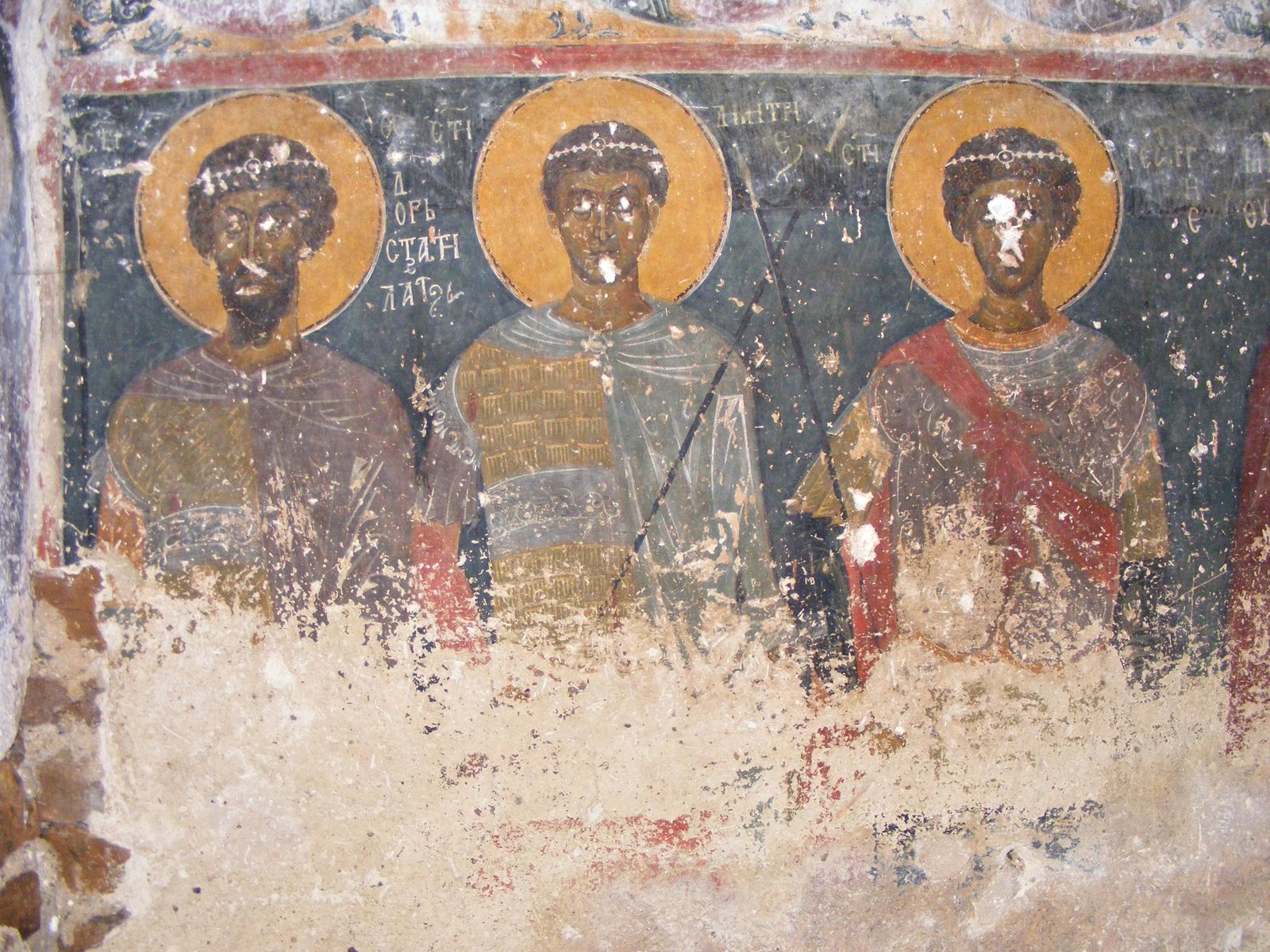
Warrior saints Theodore Stratelates, Demetrius and George

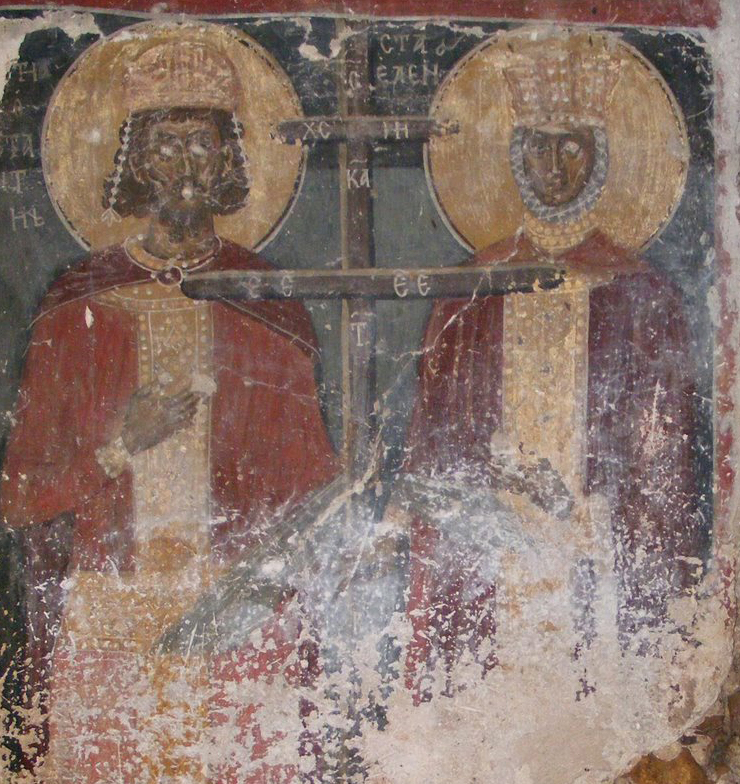
Saints Constantine and Helena
