= Chilean transport ship Angamos =

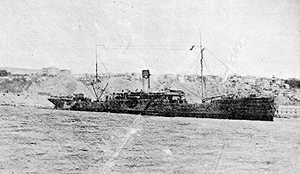
- Chilean transporter Angamos

History

Chile
- Name: Angamos
- Namesake: Naval Battle of Angamos
- Builder: C. S. Swan & Hunter, Wallsend, Newcastle
- Yard number: 158
- Launched: 13 September 1890
- Christened: Citta de Venezia
- Renamed: Spartan
- Fate: Foundered 6 July 1928

General characteristics
- Tonnage: 2,370 GRT
- Length: 120 m (390 ft)
- Beam: 14.30 m (46 ft 11 in)
- Depth: 7.62 m (25 ft 0 in)
- Installed power: 549 hp (409 kW)
- Propulsion: Triple expansion steam engine
- Speed: 15 knots (28 km/h; 17 mph)

Angamos was built in England for the "Fratelli Lavarello Fu G. B.", from Génova, under the name Citta de Venezia. Later she was sold to William Ruys & Zonen, from Rotterdam and renamed Spartan

In 1891, during the Chilean Civil War of 1891, she was sold to the Chilean government, renamed Angamos, but she arrived at Valparaíso in 1892, after the end of the war and was operated by the CSAV.

On 6 July 1928 she sailed bound for Talcahuano under Captain Ismael Suárez Maldonado and sank off Punta Morguillas 37°42′0″S 73°45′0″W, Lebu, Chile. 262 persons died, only 7 persons were rescued. It was the second biggest single-incident maritime losses of life in the history of Chile.

== See also ==
- Chilean ship Cazador, the biggest single-incident maritime losses of life in the history of Chile
