= Viskyar Ridge =

Rocky ridge in the South Shetland Islands, Antarctica

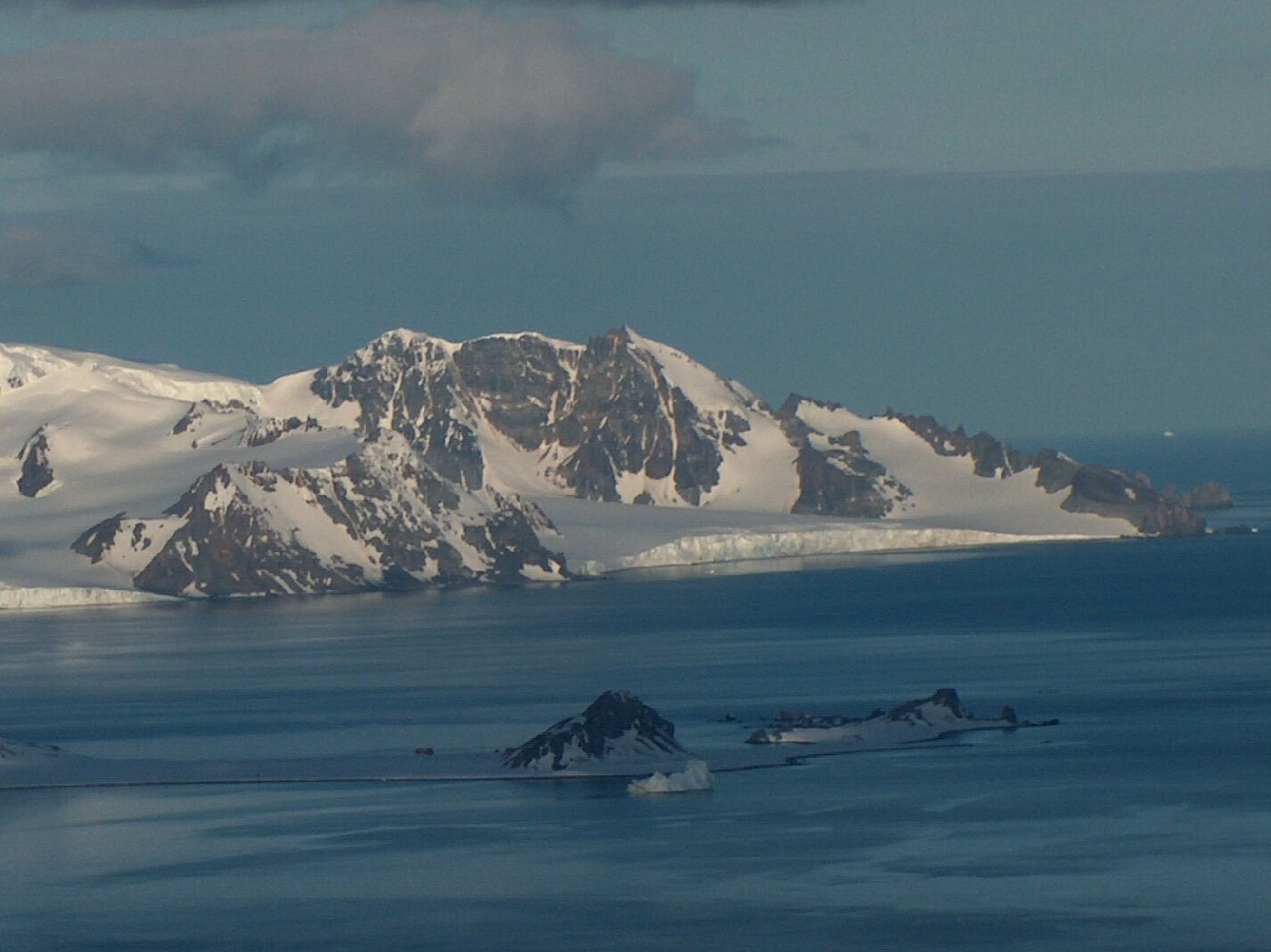
- Viskyar Ridge from near Camp Academia

Highest point
- Elevation: 600 m (2,000 ft)
- Coordinates: 62°32′29″S 59°39′29″W

Geography
- Location: Antarctica
- Parent range: Breznik Heights

Location of Greenwich Island in the South Shetland Islands.

Topographic map of Livingston Island, Greenwich, Robert, Snow and Smith Islands.

Viskyar Ridge (’rid vis-’kyar) is a rocky ridge rising to 600 m and extending 2.5 km in north-south direction in Breznik Heights, Greenwich Island in the South Shetland Islands, Antarctica. The ice-free surface area of the ridge is 135 hectares (330 acres). Surmounting Zheravna Glacier to the west and Targovishte Glacier to the east, with its south extremity forming Sartorius Point.

The feature is named after Viskyar Mountain in western Bulgaria.

== Location ==
The ridge's summit at its north extremity of the ridge is located 1.49 km southeast of Momchil Peak, 1.65 km southwest of Lyutitsa Nunatak, 1.14 km west of Vratsa Peak, 1.79 km west-northwest of Ziezi Peak, 2.05 km north of Sartorius Point, and 2.7 km east of Razgrad Peak (Bulgarian survey Tangra 2004/05 and mapping in 2009).

== Map ==
- L.L. Ivanov et al. Antarctica: Livingston Island and Greenwich Island, South Shetland Islands. Scale 1:100000 topographic map. Sofia: Antarctic Place-names Commission of Bulgaria, 2005.
