= Zheravna Glacier =

Glacier in Antarctica

- Location of Greenwich Island in the South Shetland Islands

- Location within South Shetland Islands Location within Antarctica
- Location: Greenwich Island; South Shetland Islands
- Coordinates: 62°32′50″S 59°40′56″W
- Length: 1 nmi (2 km; 1 mi)
- Width: 1 nmi (2 km; 1 mi)
- Thickness: unknown
- Terminus: McFarlane Strait
- Status: unknown

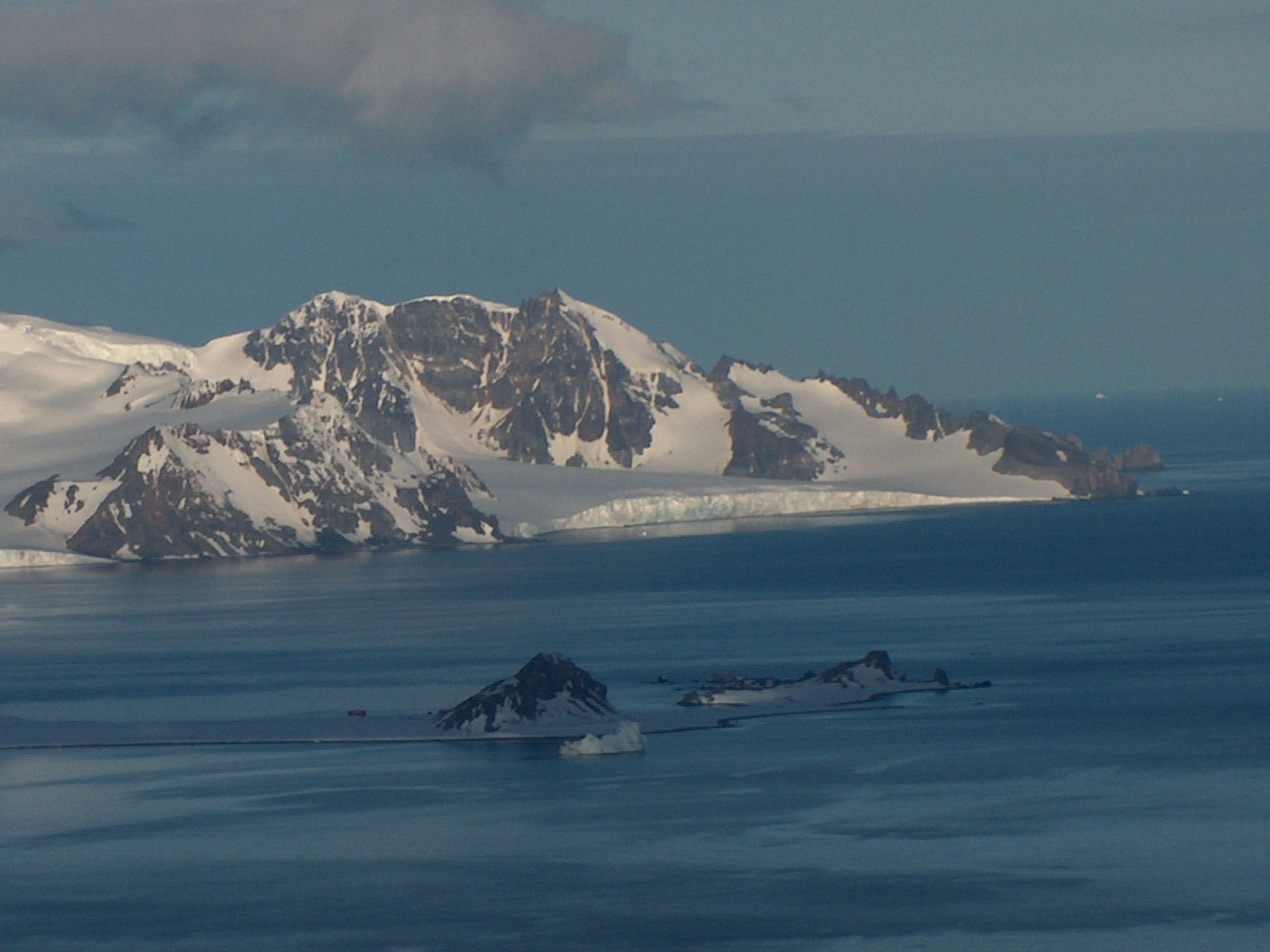
Zheravna Glacier from near Camp Academia, with Half Moon Island and McFarlane Strait in the foreground and Viskyar Ridge in the background.

Topographic map of Livingston Island, Greenwich, Robert, Snow and Smith Islands.

Zheravna Glacier (Bulgarian: ледник Жеравна, romanized: lednik Zheravna, IPA: [ˈlɛdniɡ ˈʒɛrɐvnɐ]) is a glacier on Greenwich Island, Antarctica situated east of Wulfila Glacier and west of Targovishte Glacier. It is bounded by Razgrad Peak to the west, Ilinden Peak and Momchil Peak to the north, and Viskyar Ridge to the east, extending 2 km in the east–west direction and 1.8 km in the north–south direction, and draining southwards into McFarlane Strait between Ephraim Bluff and Sartorius Point.

The feature is named after the settlement of Zheravna in the eastern Balkan Mountains, Bulgaria.

== Location ==
Zheravna Glacier is centred at 62°32′50″S 59°40′56″W (Bulgarian survey Tangra 2004/05 and mapping in 2005 and 2009).

== See also ==
- List of glaciers in the Antarctic
- Glaciology

== Maps ==
- L.L. Ivanov et al. Antarctica: Livingston Island and Greenwich Island, South Shetland Islands. Scale 1:100000 topographic map. Sofia: Antarctic Place-names Commission of Bulgaria, 2005.
- L.L. Ivanov. Antarctica: Livingston Island and Greenwich, Robert, Snow and Smith Islands. Scale 1:120000 topographic map. Troyan: Manfred Wörner Foundation, 2009. ISBN 978-954-92032-6-4
