= Sartorius Point =

Point in the South Shetland Islands, Antarctica

Location of Greenwich Island in the South Shetland Islands.

Topographic map of Livingston Island, Greenwich, Robert, Snow and Smith Islands.

Sartorius Point is a sharp ice-free tipped point formed by an offshoot of Viskyar Ridge and marking the south extremity of Greenwich Island in the South Shetland Islands, Antarctica. The point separates the termini of Zheravna Glacier to the west and Targovishte Glacier to the east. The area was visited by early 19th century sealers.

The feature's name derives from 'Sartorius Island', the name used for Greenwich Island by James Weddell in connection with Admiral Sir George R. Sartorius (1790–1885), Royal Navy.

== Location ==
The point is located at 62°33′34.4″S 59°39′24″W which is 4.56 km west-southwest of Fort Point, 9.47 km northeast of Renier Point, Livingston Island, 3.3 km east by south of Ephraim Bluff and 2.03 km south of the summit of Viskyar Ridge. British mapping in 1822 and 1968, Chilean in 1971, Argentine in 1980, and Bulgarian in 2005 and 2009.

== Maps ==
- L.L. Ivanov et al. Antarctica: Livingston Island and Greenwich Island, South Shetland Islands. Scale 1:100000 topographic map. Sofia: Antarctic Place-names Commission of Bulgaria, 2005.
- L.L. Ivanov. Antarctica: Livingston Island and Greenwich, Robert, Snow and Smith Islands. Scale 1:120000 topographic map. Troyan: Manfred Wörner Foundation, 2009. ISBN 978-954-92032-6-4
