= Berende Izvor =

Berende Izvor Беренде извор
- Village
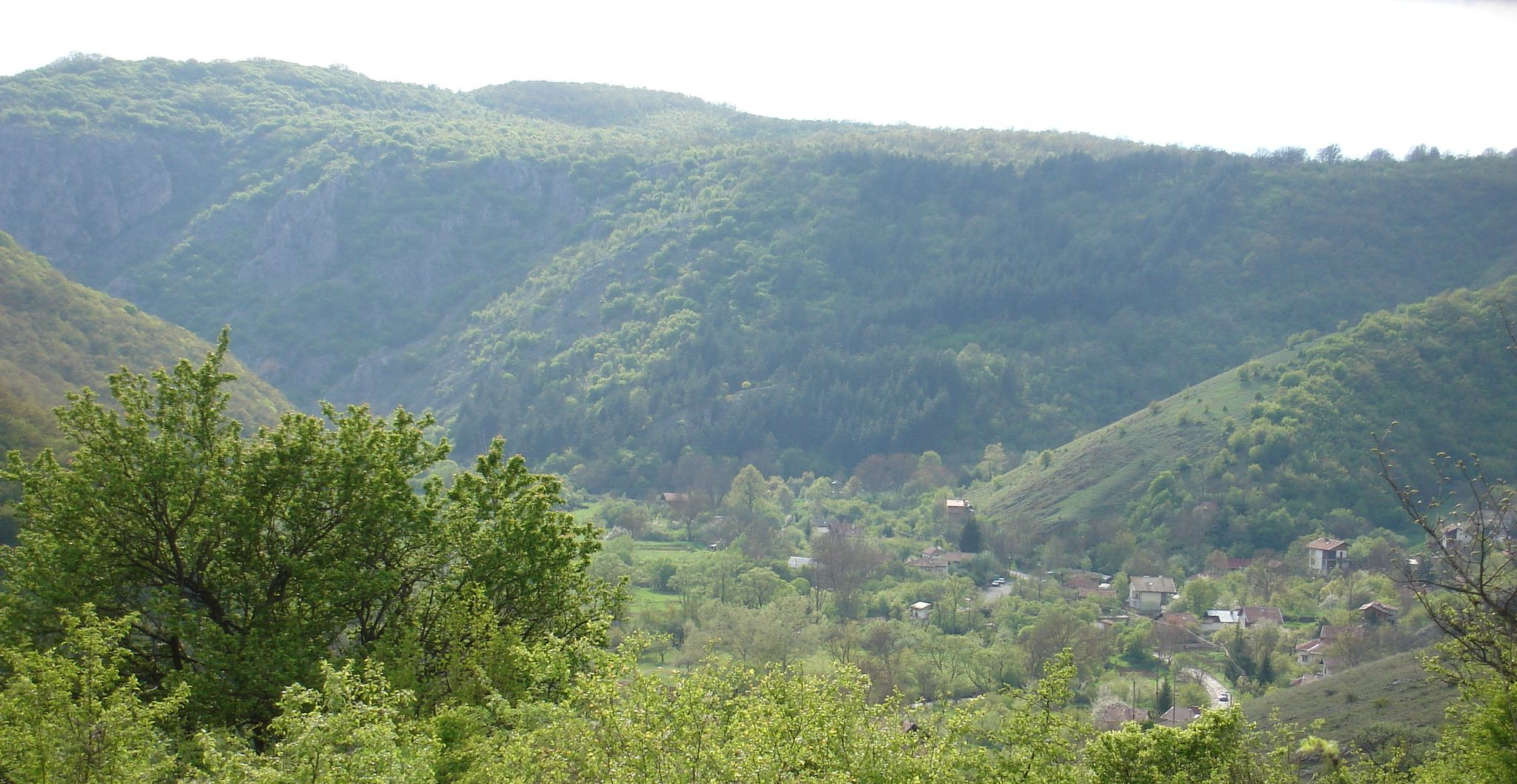
- Overlooking the village

- Location within Bulgaria
- Coordinates: 43.0417°N 22.8892°E
- Country: Bulgaria
- Province: Sofia Province
- Municipality: Dragoman

Area
  - Total: 7.27 km^{2} (2.81 sq mi)
- Elevation: 500–699 m (1,640–2,293 ft)

Population (31 December 2013)
  - Total: 27
- Time zone: UTC+2 (EET)
  - Summer (DST): UTC+3 (EEST)

Berende Izvor is a village in Dragoman Municipality, Sofia Province, in Western Bulgaria.
