= Berende, Sofia Province =

Berende Беренде
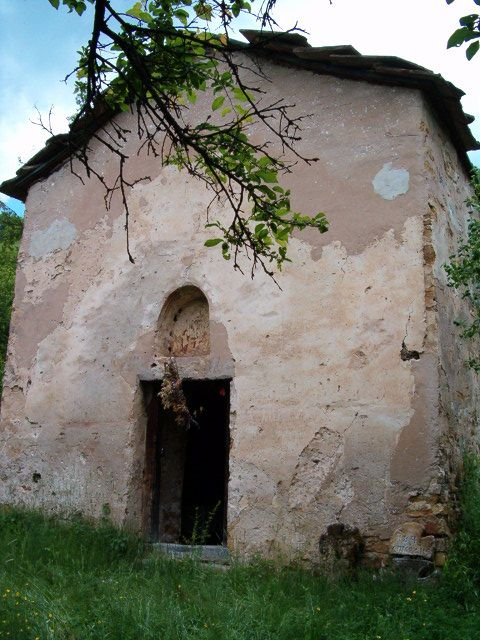
- The 14th-century Church of St Peter in Berende

- Berende
- Coordinates: 42°58′59″N 22°55′1″E
- Country: Bulgaria
- Province (Oblast): Sofia

Government
  - Mayor: Lidia Bozhilova (Kalotina)

Population (2011)
  - Total: 33
- Time zone: UTC+2 (EET)
  - Summer (DST): UTC+3 (EEST)
- Postal Code: 2212
- Area code: 07172

Berende (Bulgarian: Беренде, pronounced [bɛrɛnˈdɛ]) is a village in Dragoman Municipality, Sofia Province, in the westernmost part of Bulgaria near the border with Serbia.

Berende is located in the western reaches of the Balkan Mountains, not far from the banks of the Nishava River. The distance to the national capital Sofia is 52 km (32 mi). Nearby towns are Godech and the municipal centre Dragoman, both 10 km (6.2 mi) away. In 1985, Berende had 79 residents; in 2011, its population had dwindled to 33.

According to linguist Anna Choleva–Dimitrova, the toponym Berende stems from the Pecheneg tribe of the Berendei. The Berendei are known to have settled in various parts of the Balkans around the 10th–12th century.

The village has a medieval Bulgarian Orthodox church, the Church of St Peter, which features rich 14th-century interior frescoes. It is located 800 metres (2,600 feet) west of the village, near the Nishava. Today, the churches lies in the village's old graveyard. Not far from the church on the way linking it to the village is Mosta (Моста, “The Bridge”), a natural bridge rock formation.
