= Solis Glacier =

Glacier in Antarctica

- Location of Greenwich Island in the South Shetland Islands

- Location within South Shetland Islands Location within Antarctica
- Location: Greenwich Island; South Shetland Islands
- Coordinates: 62°31′30″S 59°43′24″W
- Length: 1.5 nmi (3 km; 2 mi)
- Width: 1 nmi (2 km; 1 mi)
- Thickness: unknown
- Terminus: Yankee Harbour
- Status: unknown

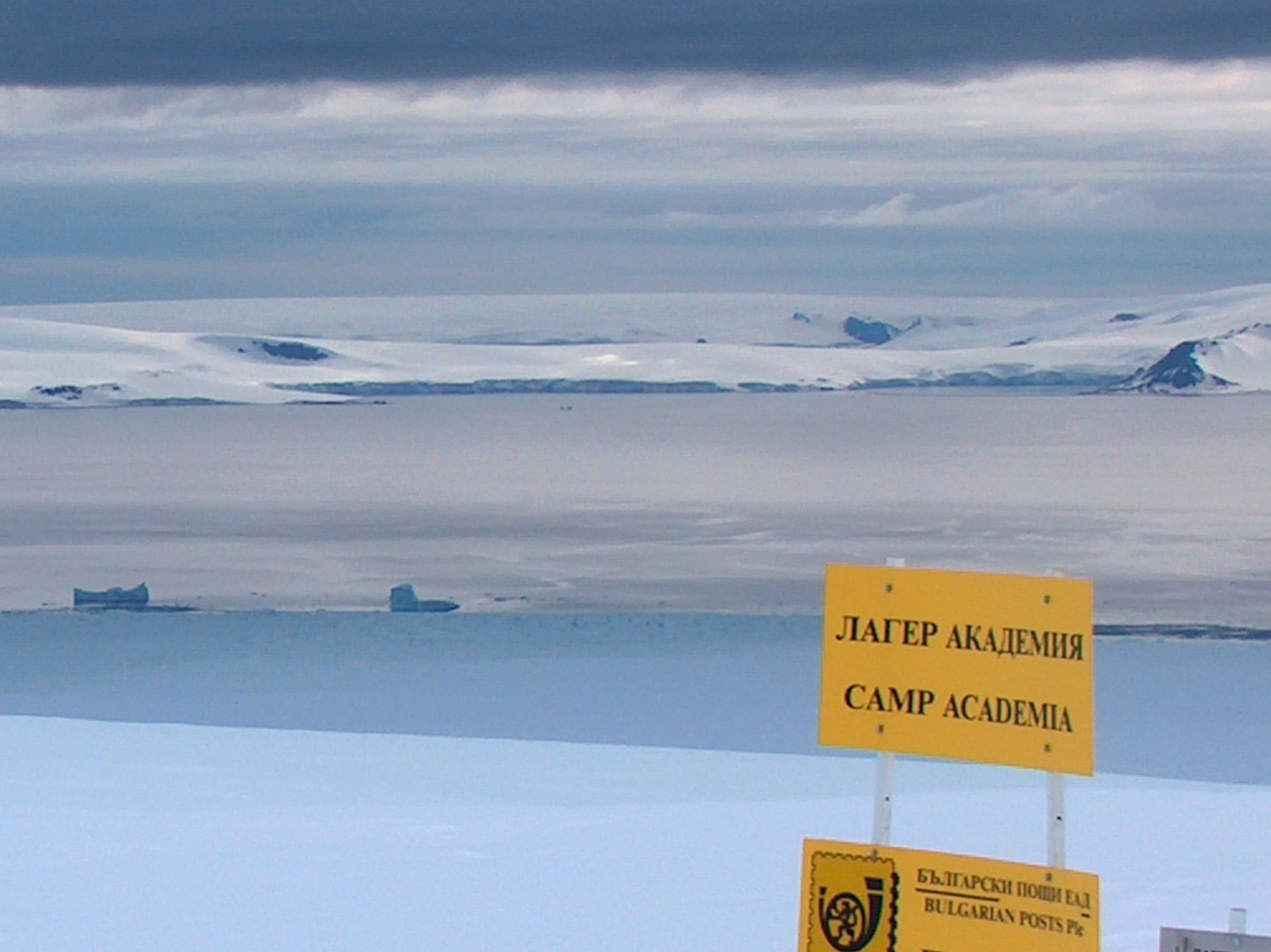
Solis Glacier (on the right) from Camp Academia, with Huron Glacier and McFarlane Strait in the foreground.

Solis Glacier is a glacier on Greenwich Island in the South Shetland Islands, Antarctica extending 2.8 km in southeast-northwest direction and 1.8 km in southwest-northeast direction and draining the north slopes of Breznik Heights to flow northwestwards into Yankee Harbour.

The feature was named by the 1952-53 Chilean Antarctic Expedition after a member of the party that made a hydrographic survey of Yankee Harbour.

== Location ==
The glacier is centred at 62°31′30″S 59°43′24″W (Bulgarian mapping in 2005 and 2009).

== See also ==
- List of glaciers in the Antarctic
- Glaciology

== Maps ==
- L.L. Ivanov et al. Antarctica: Livingston Island and Greenwich Island, South Shetland Islands. Scale 1:100000 topographic map. Sofia: Antarctic Place-names Commission of Bulgaria, 2005.
- L.L. Ivanov. Antarctica: Livingston Island and Greenwich, Robert, Snow and Smith Islands. Scale 1:120000 topographic map. Troyan: Manfred Wörner Foundation, 2009. ISBN 978-954-92032-6-4
