= Ephraim Bluff =

Ice-free bluff in the South Shetland Islands, Antarctica

Location of Greenwich Island in the South Shetland Islands.

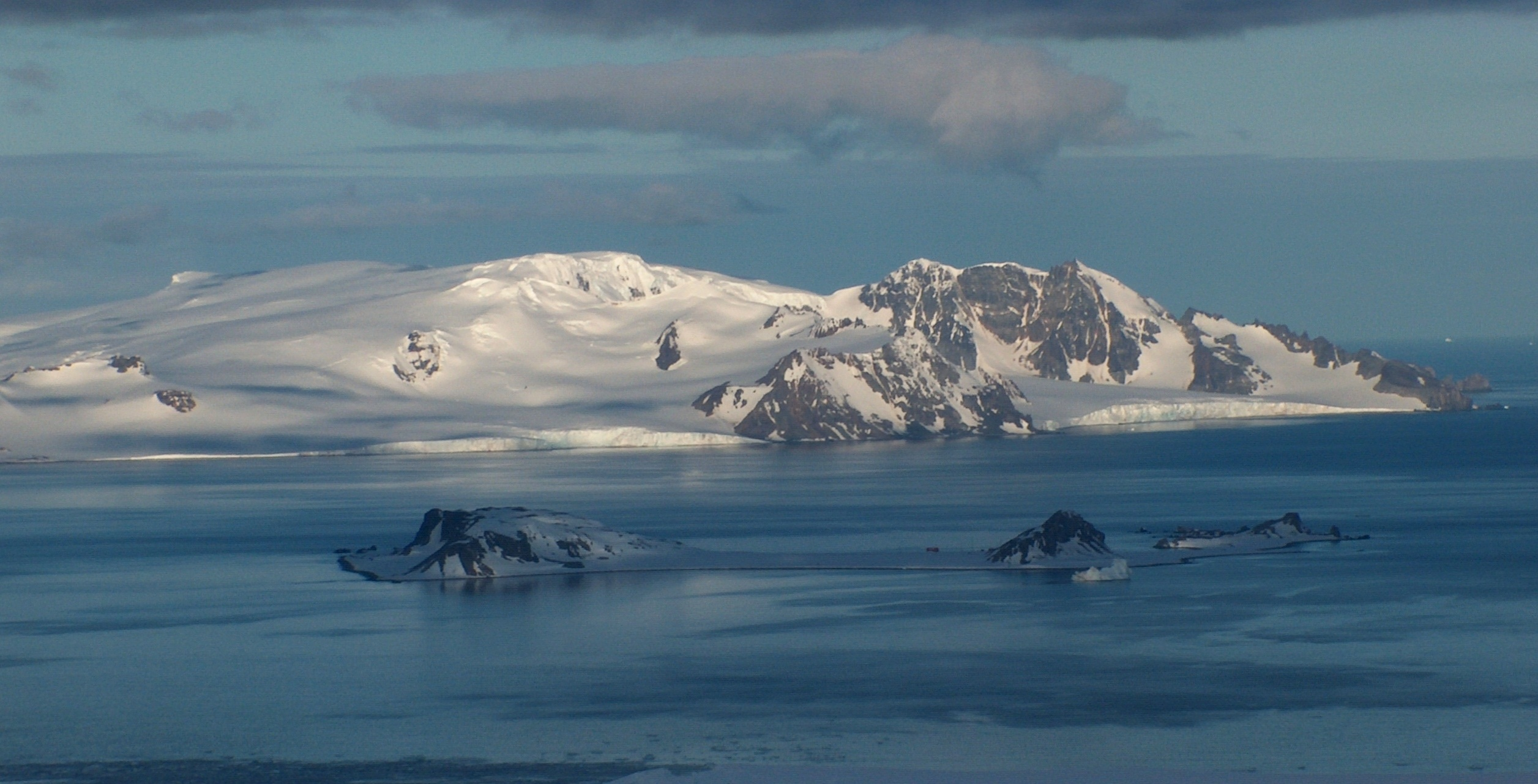
Ephraim Bluff (in the centre) from near Camp Academia, with Half Moon Island and McFarlane Strait in the foreground.

Topographic map of Livingston Island, Greenwich, Robert, Snow and Smith Islands.

Ephraim Bluff is a 425 m ice-free bluff in the south of Breznik Heights, Greenwich Island in the South Shetland Islands, Antarctica. The bluff is linked to Razgrad Peak to the north-northeast and separates the termini of Wulfila Glacier to the northwest and Zheravna Glacier to the east. It surmounts Doris Cove on the northwest.

The feature was charted and named 'Mount Ephraim' as early as 1820-22 by American sealers who used it as a lead mark for the nearby Yankee Harbour.

== Location ==
The coastal point formed by the bluff is located at 62°33′24.2″S 59°43′14.5″W which is 3.3 km west by north of Sartorius Point, 7.31 km northeast of Renier Point, Livingston Island and 7.44 km southeast of Triangle Point. British mapping in 1821, 1935 and 1968, Argentine in 1948, Chilean in 1974, and Bulgarian in 2005 and 2009.

== Maps ==
- L.L. Ivanov et al. Antarctica: Livingston Island and Greenwich Island, South Shetland Islands. Scale 1:100000 topographic map. Sofia: Antarctic Place-names Commission of Bulgaria, 2005.
- L.L. Ivanov. Antarctica: Livingston Island and Greenwich, Robert, Snow and Smith Islands. Scale 1:120000 topographic map. Troyan: Manfred Wörner Foundation, 2009. ISBN 978-954-92032-6-4
