= Breznik Heights =

Location of Greenwich Island in the South Shetland Islands from Camp Academia, Livingston Island.

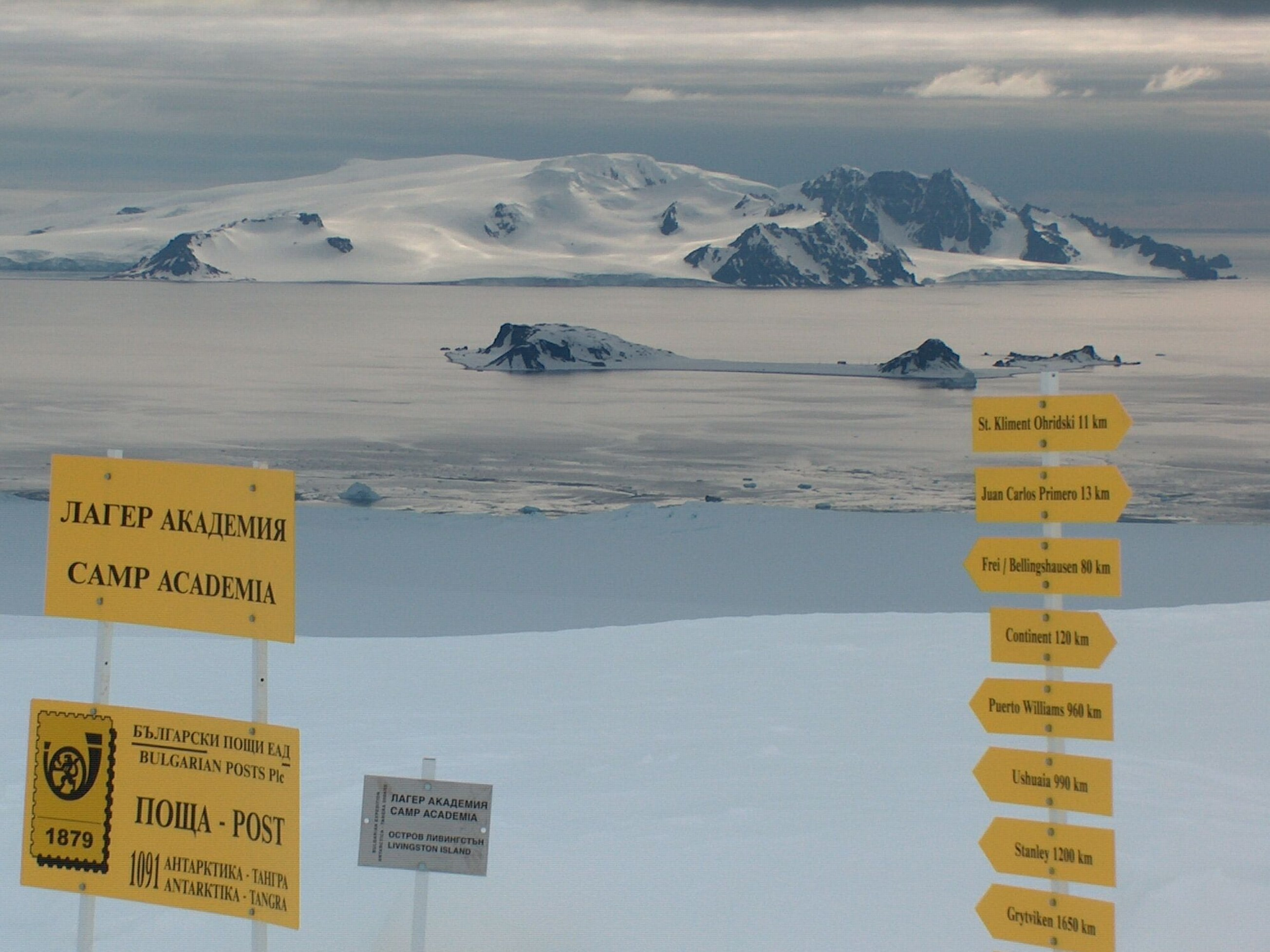
Breznik Heights

Topographic map of Livingston Island, Greenwich, Robert, Snow and Smith Islands.

Breznik Heights (Breznishki Vazvisheniya \'brez-nish-ki v&-zvi-'she-ni-ya\) rises to over 600 m in the southeast part of Greenwich Island in Antarctica. They extend 12 km between Santa Cruz Point in the northeast and the base of the moraine spit of Provadiya Hook at the mouth of Yankee Harbour in the southwest. The heights are ice-covered except for limited precipitous areas such as those at Oborishte Ridge, Ephraim Bluff, Viskyar Ridge and Bogdan Ridge.

The heights are named after the town of Breznik in Western Bulgaria.

== Location ==
Breznik Heights are centred at 62°31′30″S 59°39′50″W.

== See also ==
- Poisson Hill

== Maps ==
- L.L. Ivanov et al. Antarctica: Livingston Island and Greenwich Island, South Shetland Islands. Scale 1:100000 topographic map. Sofia: Antarctic Place-names Commission of Bulgaria, 2005.
- L.L. Ivanov. Antarctica: Livingston Island and Greenwich, Robert, Snow and Smith Islands. Scale 1:120000 topographic map. Troyan: Manfred Wörner Foundation, 2009. ISBN 978-954-92032-6-4
