= Greenwich Island =

Island of the South Shetland Islands, Antarctica

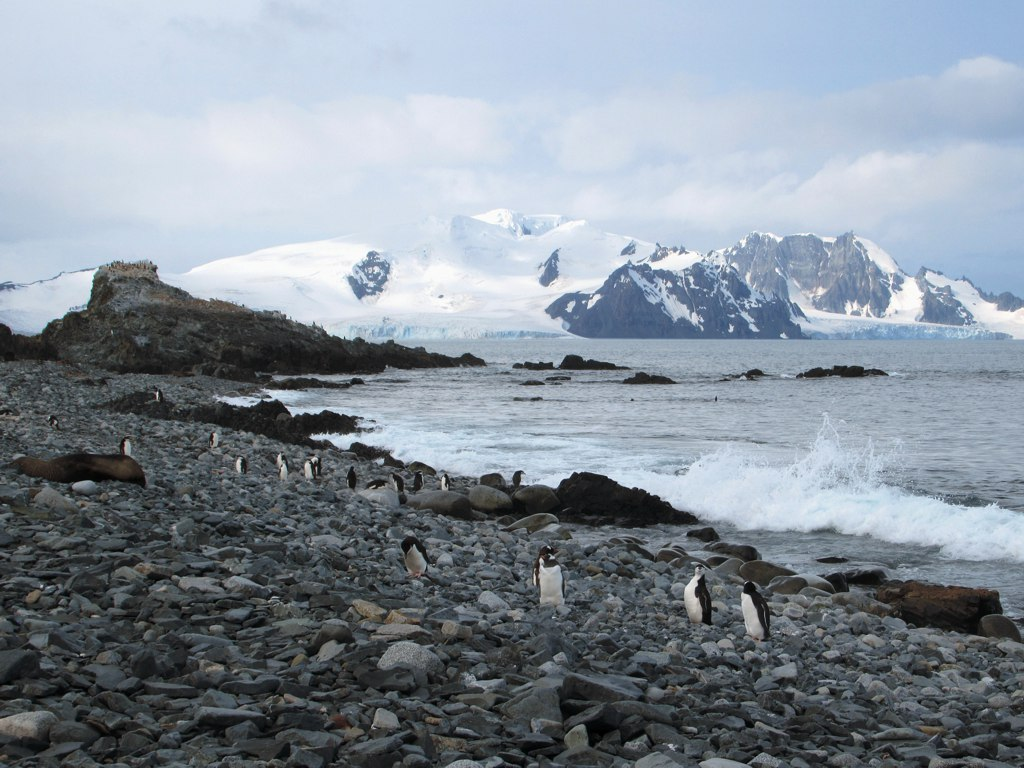
- Greenwich Island from Half Moon Island

- Location within South Shetland Islands Location within Antarctica

Geography
- Location: Antarctica
- Coordinates: 62°31′S 59°47′W
- Archipelago: South Shetland Islands
- Area: 142.7 km^{2} (55.1 sq mi)
- Length: 24 km (14.9 mi)
- Width: 5.23 km (3.25 mi)
- Highest elevation: 625 m (2051 ft)
- Highest point: Momchil Peak

Administration
- Administered under the Antarctic Treaty System

Demographics
- Population: 0

Greenwich Island (variant historical names Sartorius Island, Berezina Island) is an island 24 km (15 mi) long and from 0.80 to 9.66 km (0.5 to 6 mi) (average 5.23 km or 3.25 mi) wide, lying between Robert Island and Livingston Island in the South Shetland Islands, Antarctica. The island's surface area is 142.7 square kilometres (55.1 sq mi). The name Greenwich Island dates back to at least 1821 and is now established in international usage.

The Chilean base Arturo Prat and the Ecuadorian base Pedro Vicente Maldonado are situated on the northeast and north coast of the island, respectively.

Chilean scientists have claimed that Amerinds visited the area, due to stone artifacts recovered from bottom-sampling operations off the island. However, the artefacts — two arrowheads — were later found to have been planted.

== See also ==
- Breznik Heights
- Composite Antarctic Gazetteer
- Dryanovo Heights
- List of Antarctic islands south of 60° S
- SCAR
- Tangra 2004/05 Expedition
- Territorial claims in Antarctica

== Maps ==
- Chart of South Shetland including Coronation Island, &c. from the exploration of the sloop Dove in the years 1821 and 1822 by George Powell Commander of the same. Scale ca. 1:200000. London: Laurie, 1822.
- L.L. Ivanov et al. Antarctica: Livingston Island and Greenwich Island, South Shetland Islands (from English Strait to Morton Strait, with illustrations and ice-cover distribution). Scale 1:100000 topographic map. Sofia: Antarctic Place-names Commission of Bulgaria, 2005.
- L.L. Ivanov. Antarctica: Livingston Island and Smith Island. Scale 1:100000 topographic map. Manfred Wörner Foundation, 2017. ISBN 978-619-90008-3-0

== Gallery ==
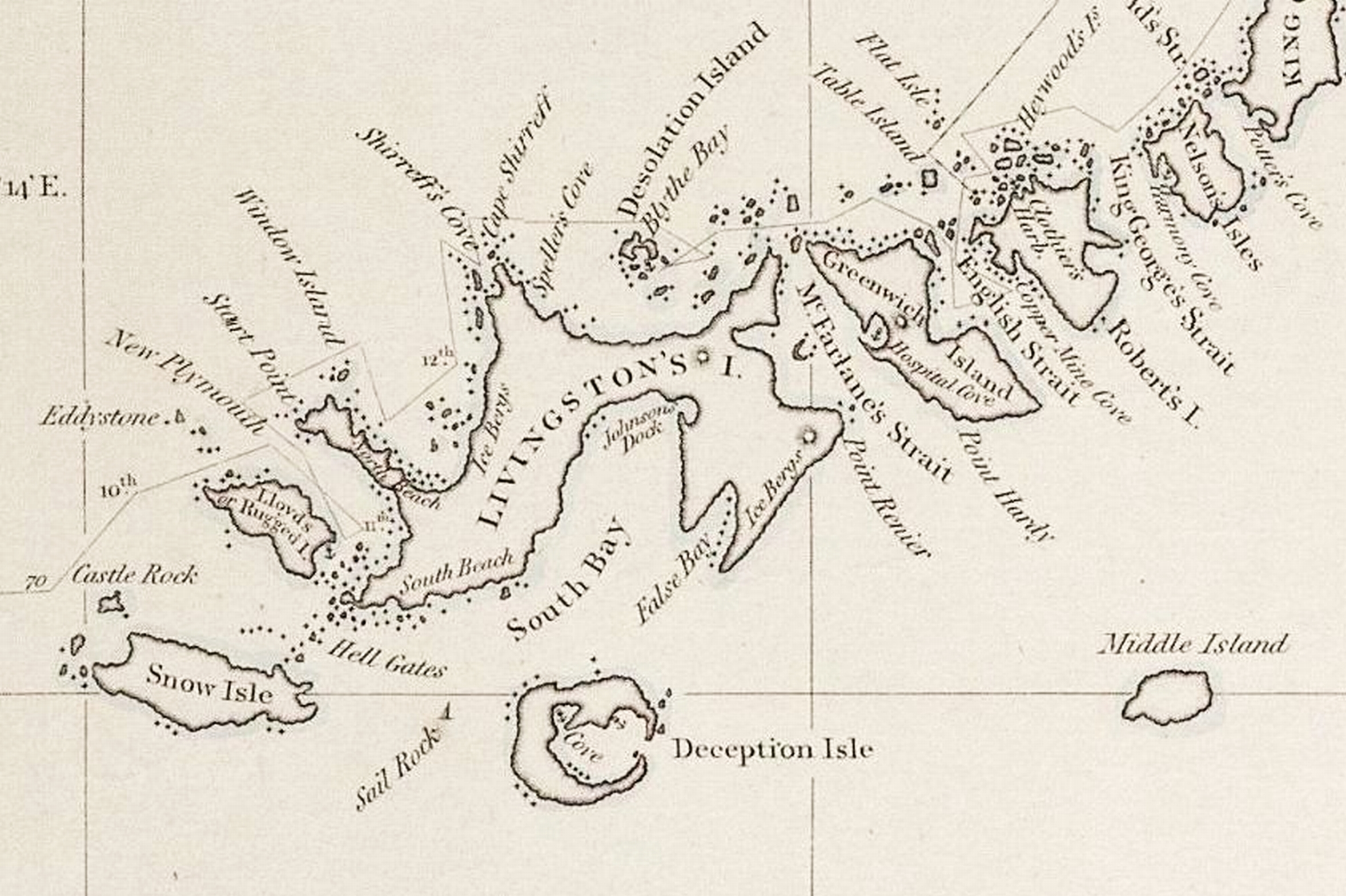
Fragment of George Powell's 1822 chart of the South Shetland Islands and South Orkney Islands featuring Greenwich Island

Topographic map of Livingston Island, Greenwich, Robert, Snow and Smith Islands

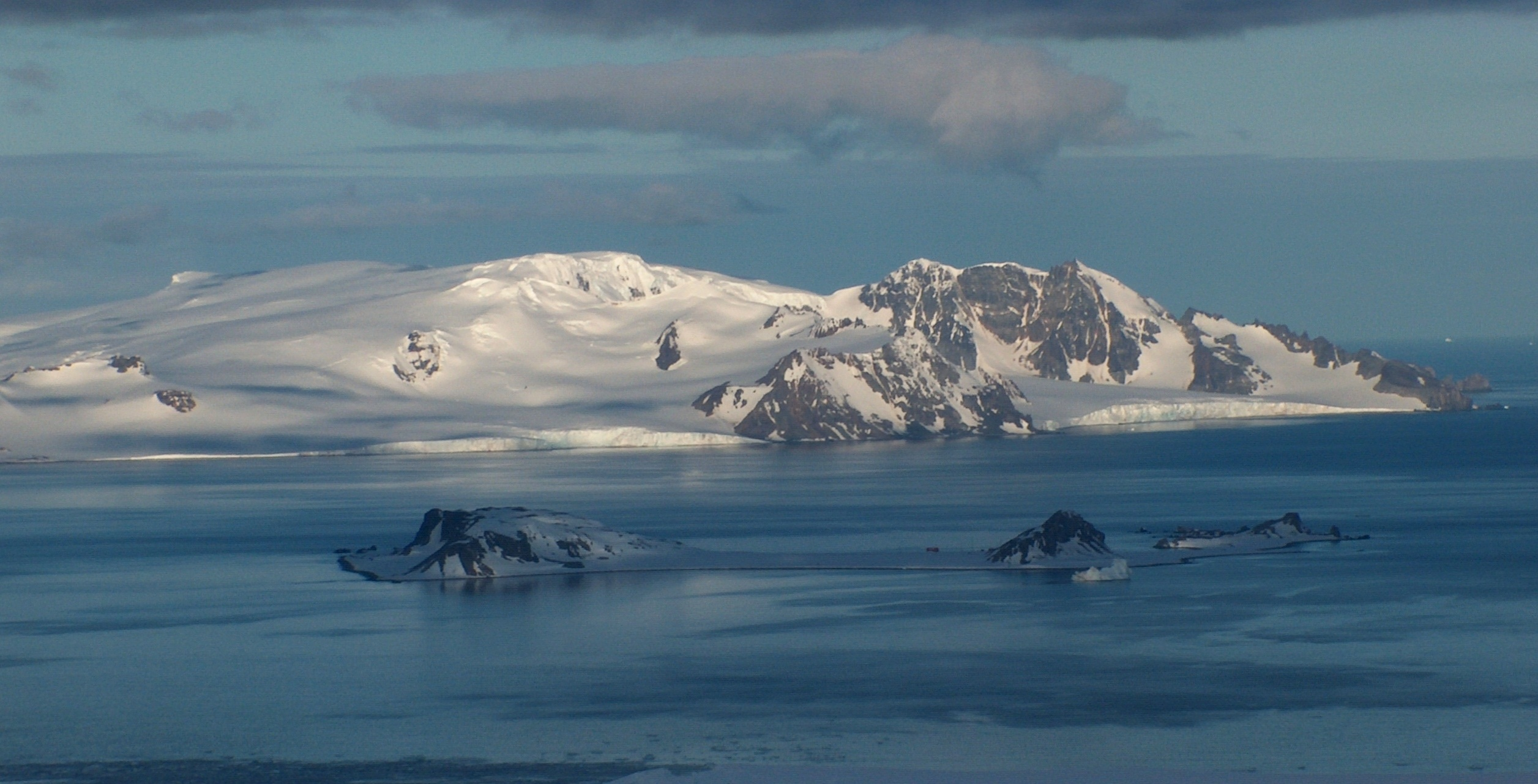
Breznik Heights, Greenwich Island from near Camp Academia, with Half Moon Island and McFarlane Strait in the foreground

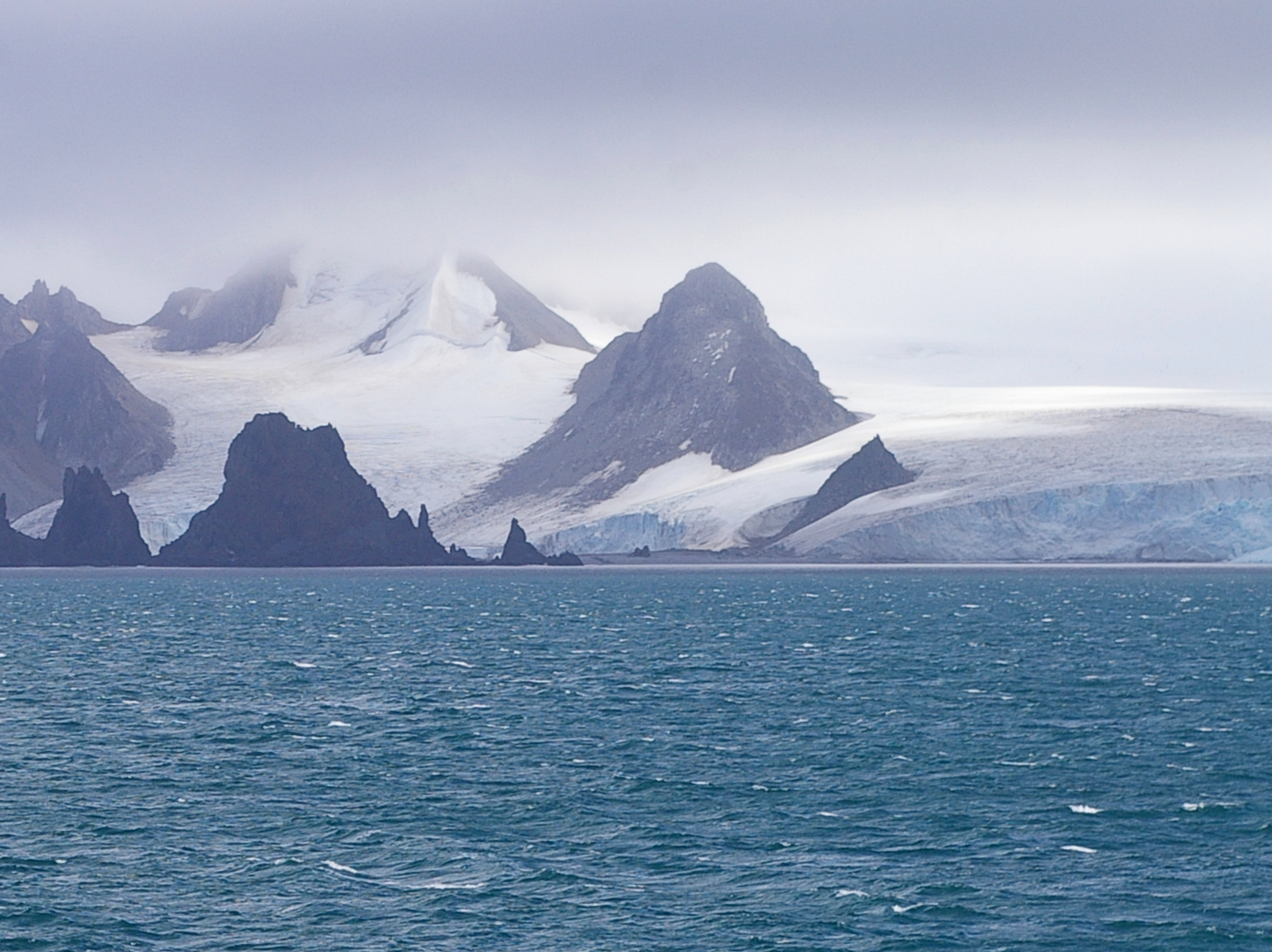
Fort Point and St. Kiprian Peak, Greenwich Island from Bransfield Strait
