= Guesalaga Peninsula =

Peninsula in the South Shetland Islands, Antarctica

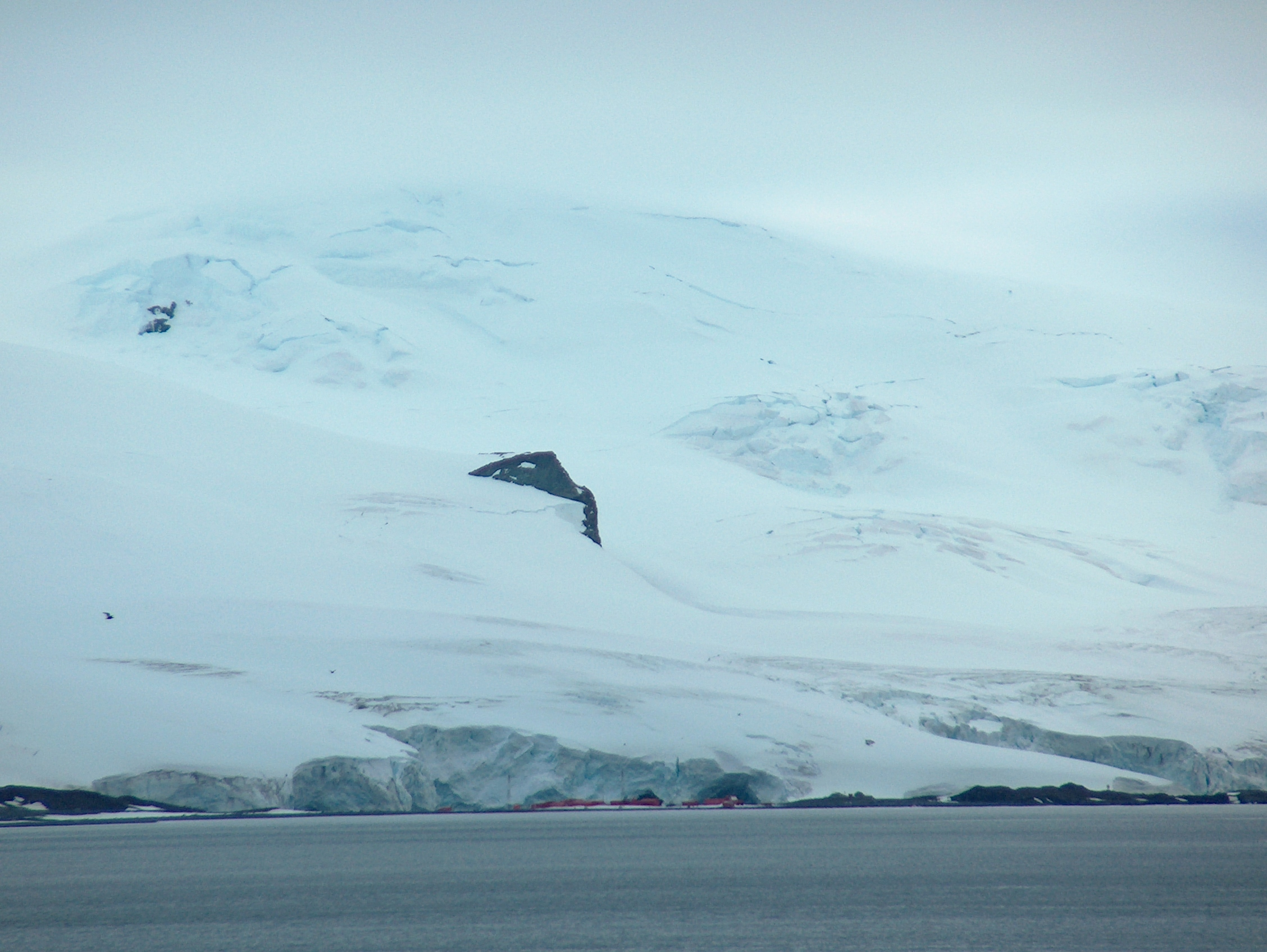
- Guesalaga Peninsula and Arturo Prat Base (in the foreground) from English Strait, with Fuerza Aérea Glacier and Breznik Heights in the background.

- Greenwich Island in the South Shetland Islands

- Location on Antarctic Peninsula Location in Antarctica

Geography
- Location: Antarctica
- Coordinates: 62°28′45.3″S 59°40′00″W
- Archipelago: South Shetland Islands

Administration
- Antarctica
- Administered under the Antarctic Treaty System

Demographics
- Population: uninhabited

Guesalaga Peninsula is a small, L-shaped, low-lying shingle covered peninsula on the east side of Discovery Bay, Greenwich Island in the South Shetland Islands, Antarctica forming the northwest coast of Iquique Cove and the north side of its entrance. The feature is projecting 700 m (766 yd) southwestwards and 300 m (328 yd) wide, with the narrow shingle Reyes Spit (62°28′46.3″S 59°40′29″W) extending 400 m (437 yd) southwestwards from its west extremity Reyes Point (62°28′44″S 59°40′13.3″W) into Discovery Bay. The Chilean Antarctic base Arturo Prat is situated on the peninsula.

Guesalaga Peninsula is named after Captain Federico Guesalaga, leader of the 1947 Chilean Antarctic Expedition in the frigate Iquique and the transport ship Angamos that established Arturo Prat Base, while Reyes Point and Reyes Spit are named after Navigation Second Sergeant Camilo who was in charge of navigation instruments in the Iquique.

== Location ==
The peninsula is centred at 62°28′45.3″S 59°40′00″W which is 1.38 km (0.86 mi) south-southwest of Ash Point, 2.67 km (1.66 mi) north-northeast of Ferrer Point and 5.03 km (3.13 mi) southeast of Spark Point (Chilean mapping in 1951 and 1971, British in 1964 and 1968, and Bulgarian in 2005 and 2009).

Topographic map of Livingston Island, Greenwich, Robert, Snow and Smith Islands.

== See also ==
- Composite Antarctic Gazetteer
- List of Antarctic islands south of 60° S
- SCAR
- Territorial claims in Antarctica

== Maps ==
- L.L. Ivanov et al. Antarctica: Livingston Island and Greenwich Island, South Shetland Islands. Scale 1:100000 topographic map. Sofia: Antarctic Place-names Commission of Bulgaria, 2005.
- L.L. Ivanov. Antarctica: Livingston Island and Greenwich, Robert, Snow and Smith Islands. Scale 1:120000 topographic map. Troyan: Manfred Wörner Foundation, 2009. ISBN 978-954-92032-6-4
