= Correa Point =

Point in the South Shetland Islands, Antarctica

Location of Greenwich Island in the South Shetland Islands.

Correa Point is a point projecting 350 m into the south part of Discovery Bay from Parvomay Neck, Greenwich Island in the South Shetland Islands, Antarctica with an adjacent ice-free area of 17 hectares (42 acres). The point forms the southwest side of the entrance to Rodríguez Cove and the southeast side of the entrance to Ramos Cove.

The feature was named by the 1947 Chilean Antarctic Expedition after Hernán Correa, cameraman for the state Directorate of Culture Information (Dirección de Información de Cultura) with the expedition; a 65 m rocky hill rising 350 m south of the point was named Picacho D.I.C. after the Directorate.

== Location ==
The point is located at 62°30′21.5″S 59°43′10.3″W which is 5.37 km southwest of Ash Point, 1.42 km southwest of Ferrer Point and 1.16 km south-southeast of Labbé Point (Chilean mapping in 1951, British in 1968, and Bulgarian in 2005 and 2009).

== Maps ==
- L.L. Ivanov et al. Antarctica: Livingston Island and Greenwich Island, South Shetland Islands. Scale 1:100000 topographic map. Sofia: Antarctic Place-names Commission of Bulgaria, 2005.
