= Rousseau Peak =

Peak in the South Shetland Islands, Antarctica

Location of Greenwich Island in the South Shetland Islands.

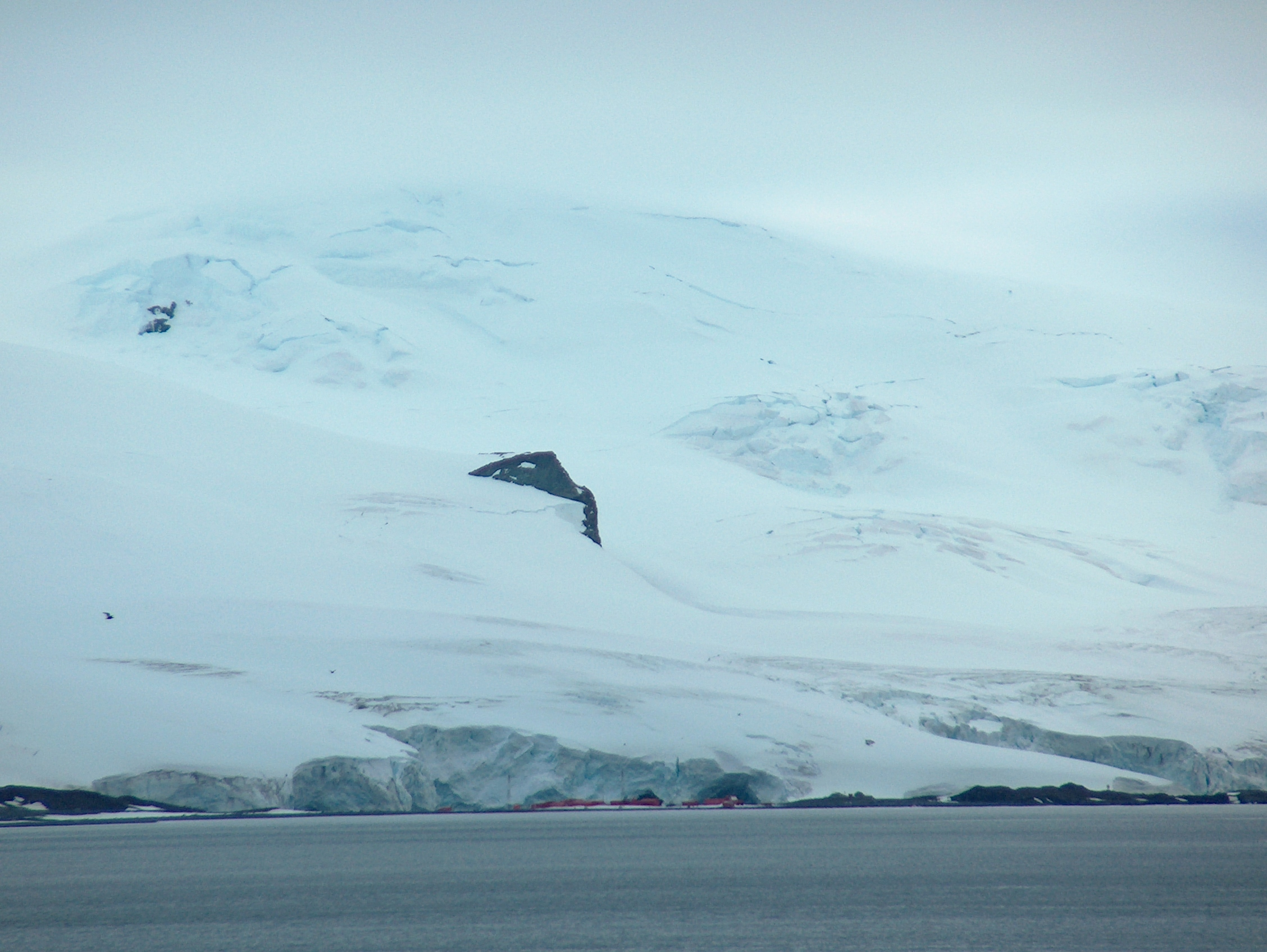
Rousseau Peak (rising from Fuerza Aérea Glacier) from English Strait, with Arturo Prat Base in the foreground.

Topographic map of Livingston Island, Greenwich, Robert, Snow and Smith Islands.

Rousseau Peak is a peak rising to 272 m in the north of Breznik Heights, Greenwich Island in the South Shetland Islands, Antarctica and surmounting Sotos Point to the west-northwest and Fuerza Aérea Glacier to the north, west and south. Precipitous, rocky west slopes.

The feature is named after Lieutenant Commander Óscar Rousseau, an Argentine Navy officer who joined the 1947 Chilean Antarctic Expedition as a guest of the Government of Chile.

== Location ==
The peak is located at 62°29′54″S 59°39′19.5″W which is 1.87 km south-southwest of López Nunatak, 4.61 km west of Bogdan Ridge, 3.81 km north-northwest of Lyutitsa Nunatak and 2.12 km east of Ferrer Point (British mapping in 1968, and Bulgarian in 2005 and 2009).

== Maps ==
- L.L. Ivanov et al. Antarctica: Livingston Island and Greenwich Island, South Shetland Islands. Scale 1:100000 topographic map. Sofia: Antarctic Place-names Commission of Bulgaria, 2005.
- L.L. Ivanov. Antarctica: Livingston Island and Greenwich, Robert, Snow and Smith Islands. Scale 1:120000 topographic map. Troyan: Manfred Wörner Foundation, 2009.
