= Iquique Cove =

Cove in the South Shetland Islands, Antarctica

González Island
- Location of Greenwich Island in the South Shetland Islands

Geography
- Location: Antarctica
- Coordinates: 62°29′04.5″S 59°40′05″W
- Archipelago: South Shetland Islands

Administration
- Antarctica
- Administered under the Antarctic Treaty System

Demographics
- Population: 0

Topographic map of Livingston Island, Greenwich, Robert, Snow and Smith Islands.

Iquique Cove is a small, 400 m (440 yd) wide cove indenting for 700 m (770 yd) the east coast of Discovery Bay, Greenwich Island in the South Shetland Islands, Antarctica. Iquique Cove is sheltered on the northwest by Guesalaga Peninsula, and the small González Island (62°29′04.5″S 59°40′05″W) is situated on the south side of the cove's entrance. The cove is used by ships servicing the Chilean Antarctic base Arturo Prat.

Iquique Cove was charted and named by the 1947 Chilean Antarctic Expedition after the naval frigate Iquique, with González Island named after Ernesto González, captain of the Iquique on that expedition.

== Location ==
The cove is centred at 62°28′57″S 59°39′40″W which is 1.64 km (1.02 mi) south by west of Ash Point and 2.58 km (1.60 mi) northeast of Ferrer Point (Chilean mapping in 1951 and 1971, British in 1964 and 1968, and Bulgarian in 2005 and 2009).

== See also ==
- Composite Antarctic Gazetteer
- List of Antarctic islands south of 60° S
- SCAR
- Territorial claims in Antarctica

== Maps ==
- L.L. Ivanov et al. Antarctica: Livingston Island and Greenwich Island, South Shetland Islands. Scale 1:100000 topographic map. Sofia: Antarctic Place-names Commission of Bulgaria, 2005.
- L.L. Ivanov. Antarctica: Livingston Island and Greenwich, Robert, Snow and Smith Islands. Scale 1:120000 topographic map. Troyan: Manfred Wörner Foundation, 2009. ISBN 978-954-92032-6-4
