= Figueroa Point =

Point on Greenwich Island, South Shetland Islands, Antarctica

- Location of Greenwich Island in the South Shetland Islands

- Location within Antarctic Peninsula Location within Antarctica

Geography
- Location: Antarctica
- Coordinates: 62°26′42.1″S 59°43′26.4″W
- Archipelago: South Shetland Islands

Administration
- Antarctica
- Administered under the Antarctic Treaty System

Demographics
- Population: uninhabited

Figueroa Point is an ice-free point at the northeast extremity of Greenwich Island in the South Shetland Islands, Antarctica forming the southeast side of the entrance to Galápagos Cove. Dovizio Rock (62°26′37.2″S 59°43′17.7″W) is lying 190 m (210 yd) to the northeast, Ibar Rocks (62°26′54.9″S 59°42′33″W) are centred 860 m (940 yd) to the southeast, Bonert Rock 62°27′01.8″S 59°42′58.3″W is 730 m (800 yd) to the south-southeast and Rosales Rocks 62°26′57.5″S 59°43′16.4″W are 500 m (550 yd) south by east of Figueroa Point. The area was visited by early 19th century sealers.

The point is named after First Lieutenant Emiliano Figueroa González, navigation officer aboard the transport ship Angamos during the 1950-51 Chilean Antarctic Expedition, and the rocks are named respectively after Sargeant Dovizio, member of the 1948-49 Chilean Antarctic Expedition; Second Lieutenant Mario Ibar, in charge of the marines onboard the frigate Iquique during the 1946-47 Chilean Antarctic Expedition; Captain Federico Bonert, second in command of the transport ship Angamos during the 1950-51 Chilean Antarctic Expedition; and Sergeant Rosales, coppersmith in the frigate Iquique during the 1947 Chilean Antarctic Expedition.

== Location ==
Figueroa Point is located at 62°26′42.1″S 59°43′26.4″W which is 210 m (230 yd) southeast of Spark Point, 6.44 km (4.00 mi)southwest of Negra Point, Robert Island, 4.37 km (2.72 mi) southwest of Ash Point and 1.52 km (0.94 mi) north by east of Serrano Point, Greenwich Island (British mapping in 1935 and 1968, Argentine in 1949 and 1980, Chilean in 1951, 1965 and 1971, and Bulgarian in 2005 and 2009).

== See also ==
- Composite Antarctic Gazetteer
- List of Antarctic islands south of 60° S
- SCAR
- Territorial claims in Antarctica

== Maps ==
- L.L. Ivanov et al. Antarctica: Livingston Island and Greenwich Island, South Shetland Islands. Scale 1:100000 topographic map. Sofia: Antarctic Place-names Commission of Bulgaria, 2005.
- L.L. Ivanov. Antarctica: Livingston Island and Greenwich, Robert, Snow and Smith Islands. Scale 1:120000 topographic map. Troyan: Manfred Wörner Foundation, 2009. ISBN 978-954-92032-6-4
