= Ortiz Point =

Ice-covered point in the South Shetland Islands, Antarctica

Location of Greenwich Island in the South Shetland Islands.

Ortiz Point is an ice-covered point on the northwest coast of Discovery Bay, Greenwich Island in the South Shetland Islands, Antarctica named after Engineman Ortiz, member of the expedition.

== Location ==
The point is located at 62°28′23.7″S 59°45′30.2″W which is 3.7 km south-southwest of Spark Point, 2.17 km southwest of Serrano Point, 5.35 km west-southwest of Ash Point, 3 km north-northwest of Labbé Point and 2.15 km north by west of Riquelme Point (Chilean mapping in 1951, British in 1968, and Bulgarian in 2005 and 2009).

== Maps ==
- L.L. Ivanov et al. Antarctica: Livingston Island and Greenwich Island, South Shetland Islands. Scale 1:100000 topographic map. Sofia: Antarctic Place-names Commission of Bulgaria, 2005.
- L.L. Ivanov. Antarctica: Livingston Island and Greenwich, Robert, Snow and Smith Islands. Scale 1:120000 topographic map. Troyan: Manfred Wörner Foundation, 2009. ISBN 978-954-92032-6-4
