= López Nunatak =

Summit in Antarctica

Location of Greenwich Island in the South Shetland Islands.

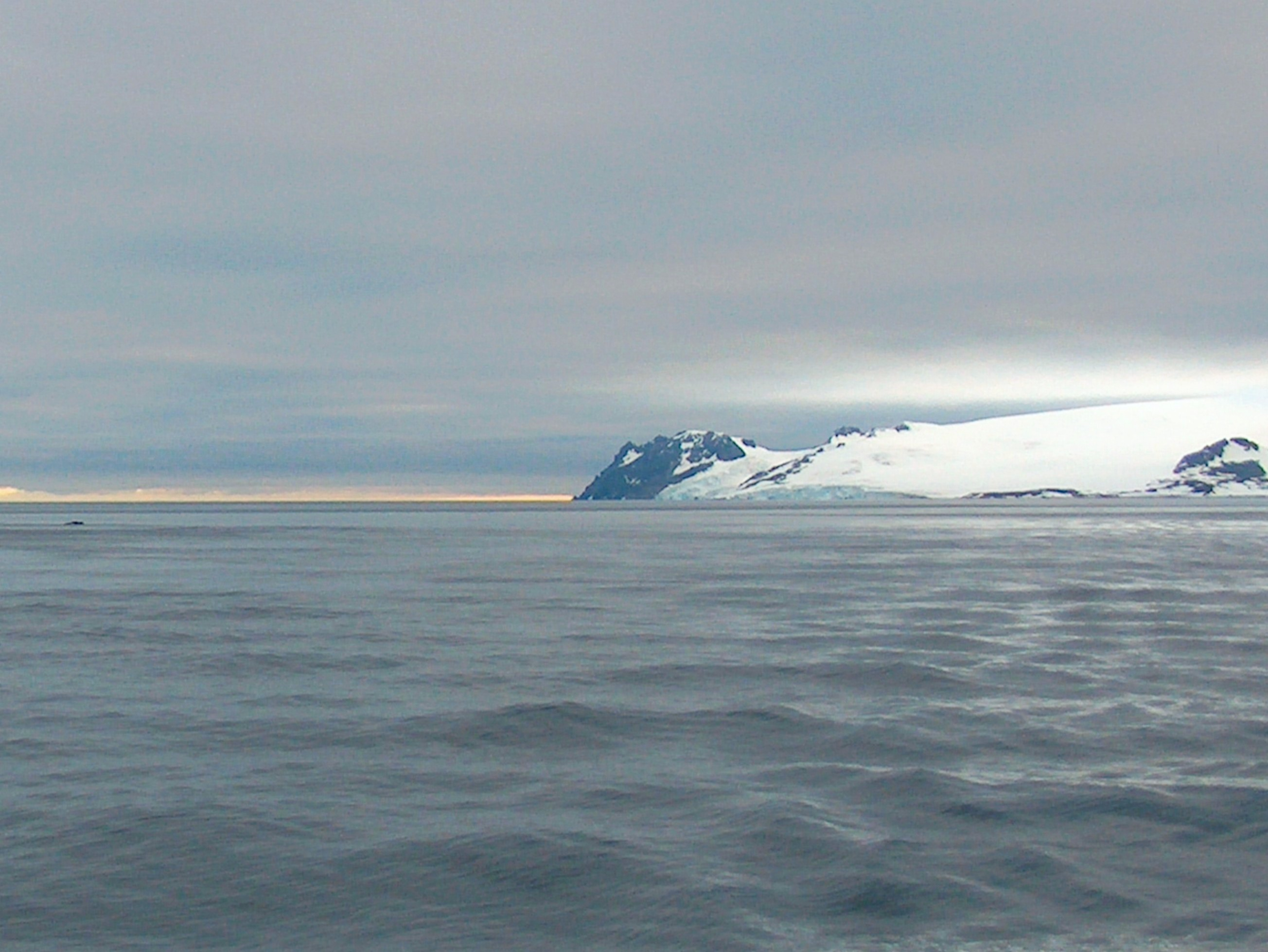
Greenwich Island from English Strait, with López Nunatak on the right and Bogdan Ridge on the left.

Topographic map of Livingston Island, Greenwich, Robert, Snow and Smith Islands.

López Nunatak is a steep-sided granitic nunatak, 275 metres (900 ft) high, forming the northern extremity of the Breznik Heights, Greenwich Island in the South Shetland Islands, Antarctica and overlooking Fuerza Aérea Glacier to the south-southwest, and Ash Point and the Chilean Captain Arturo Prat Base to the northwest.

The feature was charted by the 1947 Chilean Antarctic Expedition and subsequently named after First Lieutenant Sergio López Angulo, Communications Officer in the expedition frigate Iquique.

== Location ==
The peak is located at 62°28′57.8″S 59°38′31″W which is 4.38 km northwest of Bogdan Ridge and 1.87 km north-northeast of Rousseau Peak (British mapping in 1968, and Bulgarian in 2005 and 2009).

== Maps ==
- L.L. Ivanov et al. Antarctica: Livingston Island and Greenwich Island, South Shetland Islands. Scale 1:100000 topographic map. Sofia: Antarctic Place-names Commission of Bulgaria, 2005.
- L.L. Ivanov. Antarctica: Livingston Island and Greenwich, Robert, Snow and Smith Islands. Scale 1:120000 topographic map. Troyan: Manfred Wörner Foundation, 2009.
