= Ilarion Ridge =

Coordinates: 62°31′27″S 59°36′11″W

Location of Greenwich Island in the South Shetland Islands.

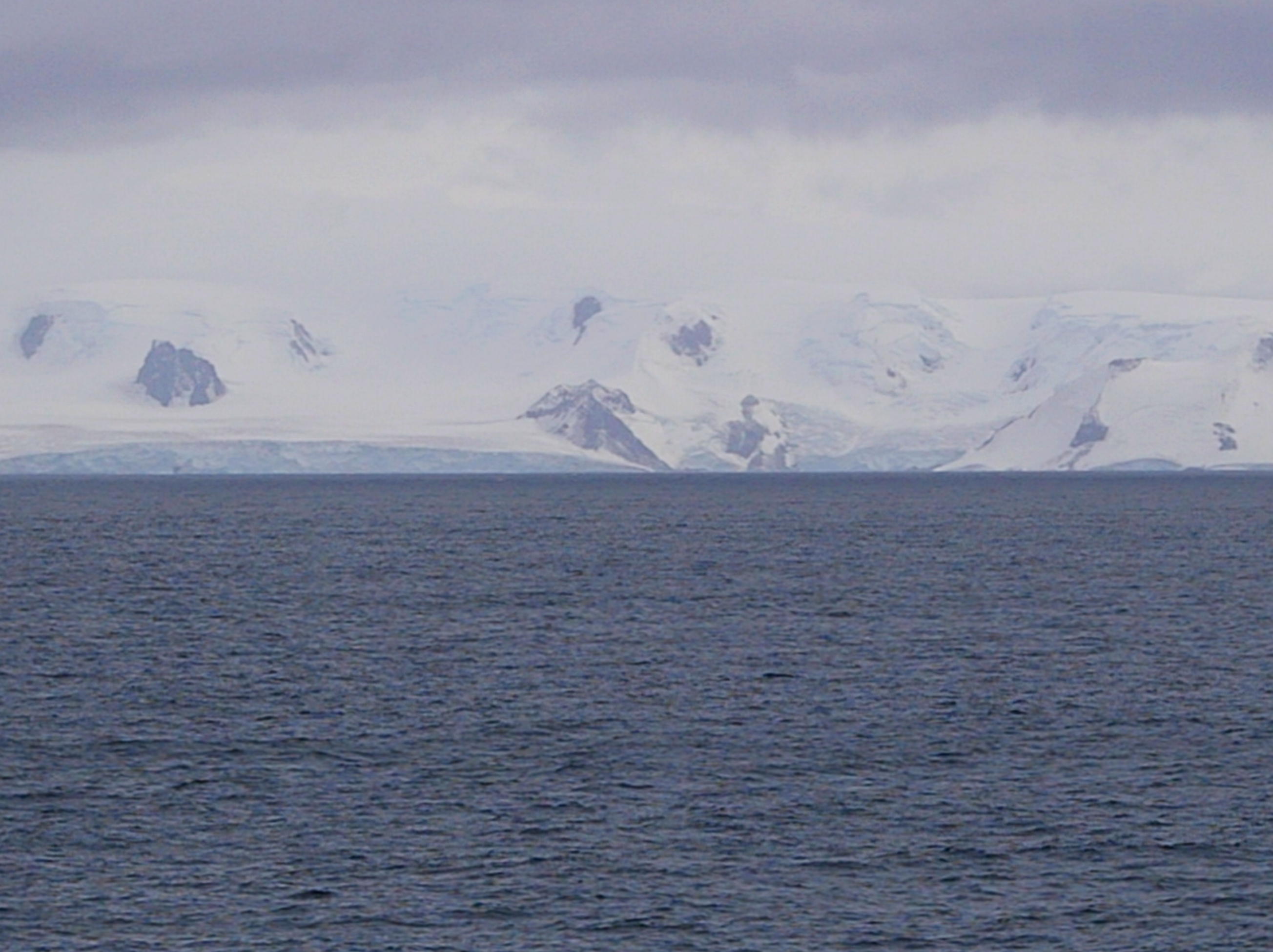
Ilarion Ridge from Bransfield Strait.

Topographic map of Livingston Island, Greenwich, Robert, Snow and Smith Islands.

Ilarion Ridge is a partly ice-free ridge of elevation 240 m situated in Breznik Heights on Greenwich Island, Antarctica. Extending along the south coast of Hardy Cove, 2 km southwest of Parchevich Ridge, 1.9 km east-northeast of Lyutitsa Nunatak, 2.5 km northeast of Vratsa Peak, 1.3 km north of St. Kiprian Peak, and 2.6 km north-northwest of Fort Point. Overlooking Musala Glacier to the south. Bulgarian topographic survey Tangra 2004/05. Named after Metropolitan Ilarion Makariopolski (1812–75), a leading figure in the restoration of the autocephalous Bulgarian Church in 1870.

== Maps ==
- L.L. Ivanov et al. Antarctica: Livingston Island and Greenwich Island, South Shetland Islands. Scale 1:100000 topographic map. Sofia: Antarctic Place-names Commission of Bulgaria, 2005.
- L.L. Ivanov. Antarctica: Livingston Island and Greenwich, Robert, Snow and Smith Islands. Scale 1:120000 topographic map. Troyan: Manfred Wörner Foundation, 2009. ISBN 978-954-92032-6-4
