= Maldonado Base =

Ecuadorian Antarctic station on Greenwich Island

Maldonado Station
- Antarctic station
- Pedro Vincente Maldonado
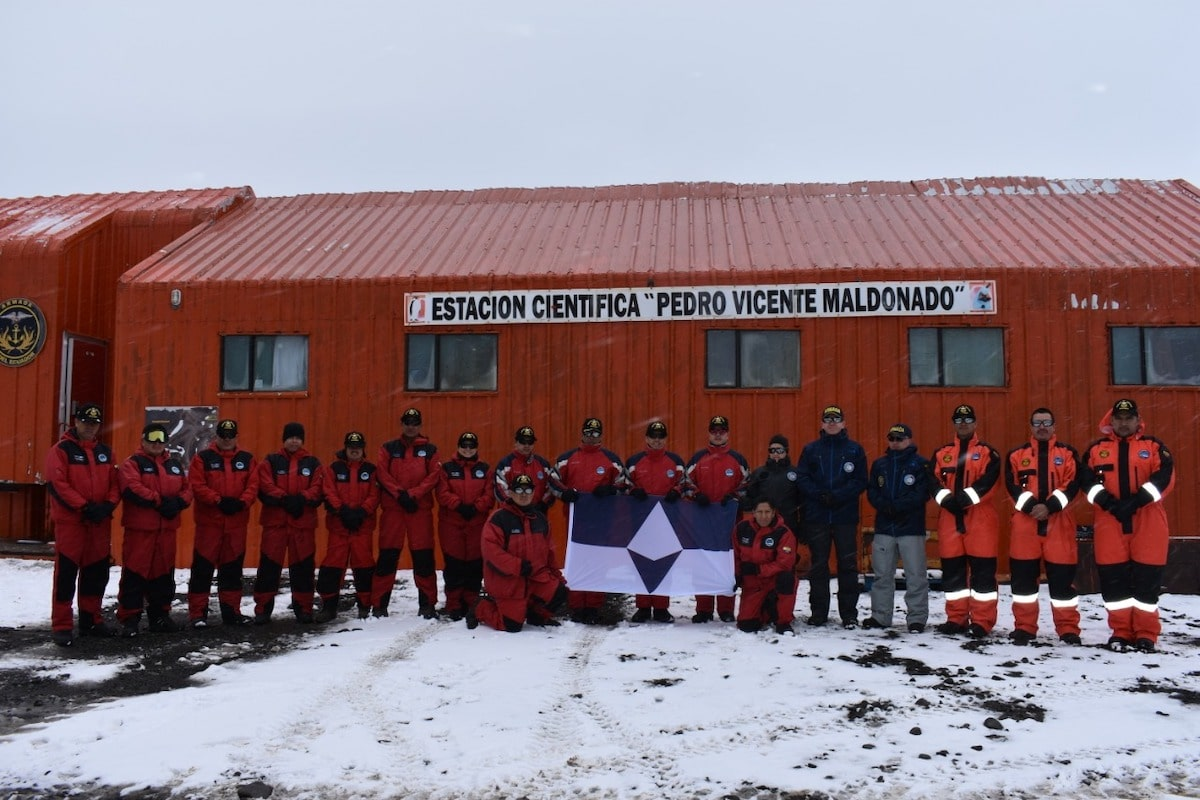

- Location of Maldonado Station in Antarctica
- Coordinates: 62°26′57″S 59°44′29″W
- Country: Ecuador
- Location in Antarctica: Greenwich Island; South Shetland Islands; Antarctica
- Administered by: Instituto Antártico Ecuatoriano INAE
- Established: 2 March 1990
- Elevation: 10 m (33 ft)

Population (2017)
  - Summer: 32
  - Winter: 0
- Type: Seasonal
- Period: Summer
- Status: Operational
- Activities: List: Geodesy; Geophysics; Geomorphology; Microbiology; Oceanography; Sedimentology
- Website: Instituto Antartico Ecuatoriano
- Maldonado Range Front
- Markings: White (tower), black (stripe), yellow (daymark)
- Power source: solar power
- Focal height: 9 m (30 ft)
- Range: 6 nmi (11 km; 6.9 mi)
- Characteristic: Fl W 4s

Maldonado Base, also Pedro Vicente Maldonado Base, is the Ecuadorian Antarctic research base situated at Guayaquil Bay, Greenwich Island. It is located in the South Shetland Islands, Antarctica. It opened in 1990. The area was visited by early 19th century sealers operating from nearby Clothier Harbour.

The base is named after the Spanish-American astronomer, topographer, and geographer Pedro Vicente Maldonado (1704–1748) born in Riobamba, present Ecuador.

There is a lighthouse near the base.

== Location ==
The base is located at 62°26′57″S 59°44′29″W which is 560 m south-southwest of Orión Point, 990 m southwest of Spark Point, 1.16 km north-northwest of Serrano Point and 2.56 km east-southeast of Agüedo Point (detailed Ecuadorian mapping in 2007, Bulgarian mapping in 2005 and 2009).

== Maps ==
- L.L. Ivanov et al. Antarctica: Livingston Island and Greenwich Island, South Shetland Islands. Scale 1:100000 topographic map. Sofia: Antarctic Place-names Commission of Bulgaria, 2005.
- L.L. Ivanov. Antarctica: Livingston Island and Greenwich, Robert, Snow and Smith Islands. Scale 1:120000 topographic map. Troyan: Manfred Wörner Foundation, 2010. ISBN 978-954-92032-9-5 (First edition 2009. ISBN 978-954-92032-6-4)

== See also ==
- List of lighthouses in Antarctica
- List of Antarctic research stations
- List of Antarctic field camps
