= Jorquera Glacier =

Glacier in Antarctica

Jorquera Glacier (62°28′00″S 59°39′00″W) is a glacier on Greenwich Island which flows west into Discovery Bay south of Ash Point. Charted by the Complex Antarctic Expedition of the USSR Academy of Science in 1965 and probably named for Captain (F) P. Jorquera G.
