= Riquelme Point =

Point in the South Shetland Islands, Antarctica

Location of Greenwich Island in the South Shetland Islands.

Riquelme Point is a point projecting 450 m into the southwest part of Discovery Bay from Parvomay Neck, Greenwich Island in the South Shetland Islands, Antarctica and forming the west side of the entrance to Vinett Cove.

The feature was named by the 1947 Chilean Antarctic Expedition after Signalman Riquelme, a crewman of the frigate Iquique.

== Location ==
The point is located at 62°29′32.8″S 59°45′16.2″W which is 1.3 km west-northwest of Labbé Point, 2.15 km south by east of Ortiz Point and 5.64 km south by west of Spark Point (Chilean mapping in 1951, British in 1968, and Bulgarian in 2005 and 2009).

== Maps ==
- L.L. Ivanov et al. Antarctica: Livingston Island and Greenwich Island, South Shetland Islands. Scale 1:100000 topographic map. Sofia: Antarctic Place-names Commission of Bulgaria, 2005.
- L.L. Ivanov. Antarctica: Livingston Island and Greenwich, Robert, Snow and Smith Islands. Scale 1:120000 topographic map. Troyan: Manfred Wörner Foundation, 2009. ISBN 978-954-92032-6-4
