= Musala Glacier =

Glacier located in Antarctica

- Location of Greenwich Island in the South Shetland Islands

- Location within South Shetland Islands Location within Antarctica
- Location: Greenwich Island; South Shetland Islands
- Coordinates: 62°31′57″S 59°36′49″W
- Length: 2 nautical miles (3.7 km; 2.3 mi)
- Width: 1.2 nautical miles (2.2 km; 1.4 mi)
- Thickness: unknown
- Terminus: Bransfield Strait
- Status: unknown

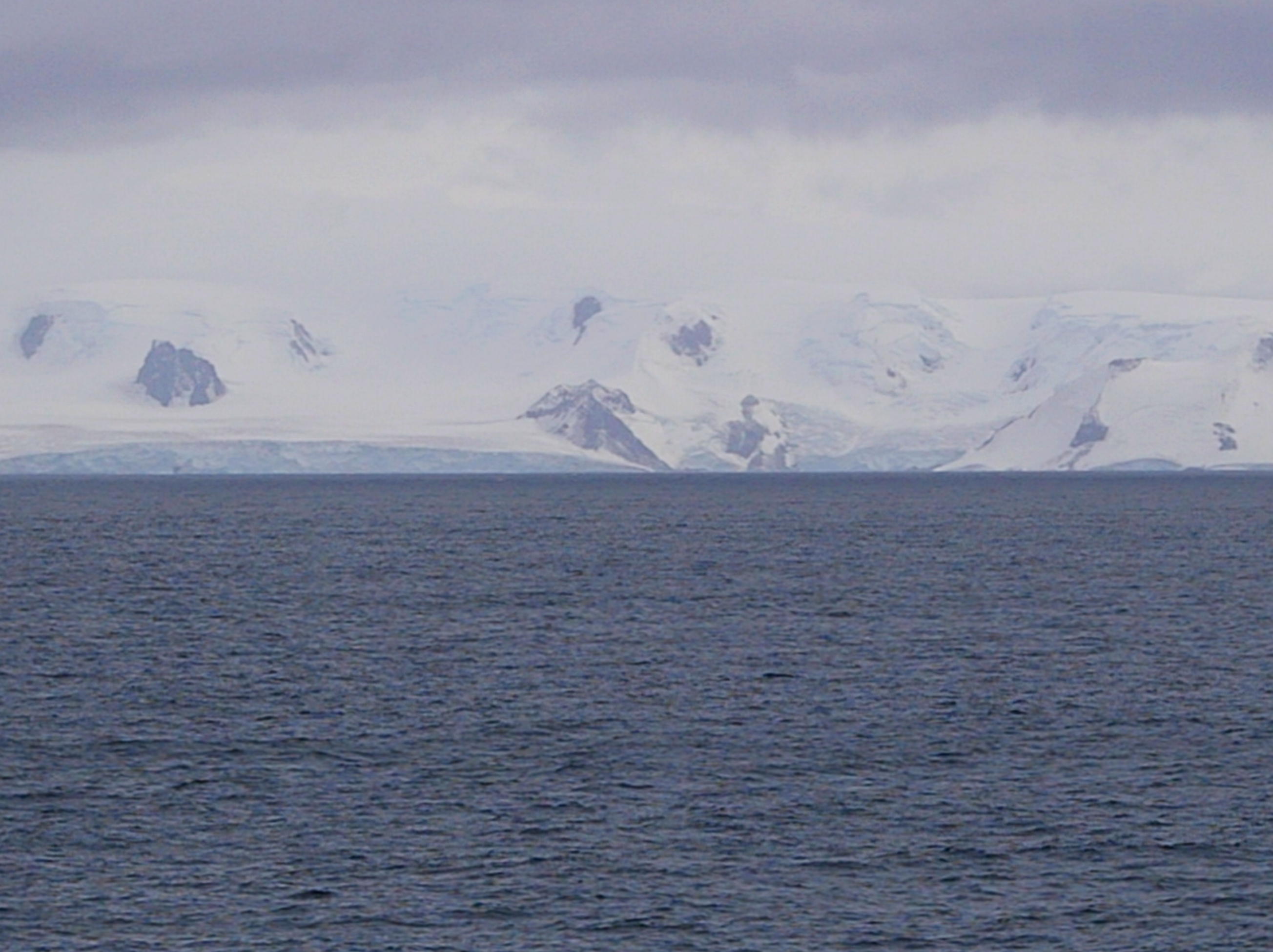
Musala Glacier (on the left) from Bransfield Strait.

Topographic map of Livingston Island and Smith Island

Musala Glacier (Bulgarian: ледник Мусала, romanized: lednik Musala, IPA: [ˈlɛdnik mosɐˈɫa]) on Greenwich Island in the South Shetland Islands, Antarctica is situated northeast of Targovishte Glacier, east-northeast of Zheravna Glacier and southeast of Fuerza Aérea Glacier. It is bounded by St. Kiprian Peak to the south, Vratsa Peak to the southwest, central Breznik Heights to the west, and Ilarion Ridge bordering Hardy Cove to the northeast, extends 2 nautical miles (3.7 km; 2.3 mi) in east-west direction and 1.2 nautical miles (2.2 km; 1.4 mi) in north-south direction, and drains eastwards into Bransfield Strait north of Fort Point.

The glacier is named after Musala Peak in the Rila Mountain, the summit of Bulgaria and the Balkan Peninsula.

== Location ==
Musala Glacier is centred at 62°31′57″S 59°36′49″W. Bulgarian mapping in 2005 and 2009.

== See also ==
- List of glaciers in the Antarctic
- Glaciology

== Maps ==
- L.L. Ivanov et al. Antarctica: Livingston Island and Greenwich Island, South Shetland Islands. Scale 1:100000 topographic map. Sofia: Antarctic Place-names Commission of Bulgaria, 2005.
- L.L. Ivanov. Antarctica: Livingston Island and Greenwich, Robert, Snow and Smith Islands. Scale 1:120000 topographic map. Troyan: Manfred Wörner Foundation, 2009. ISBN 978-954-92032-6-4
- Antarctic Digital Database (ADD). Scale 1:250000 topographic map of Antarctica. Scientific Committee on Antarctic Research (SCAR). Since 1993, regularly upgraded and updated.
- L.L. Ivanov. Antarctica: Livingston Island and Smith Island. Scale 1:100000 topographic map. Manfred Wörner Foundation, 2017. ISBN 978-619-90008-3-0
