= Ibar Rocks =

Uninhabited islands in the South Shetland Islands

- Location of Greenwich Island in the South Shetland Islands

- Location within Antarctic Peninsula Location within Antarctica

Geography
- Location: Antarctica
- Coordinates: 62°26′55″S 59°42′33″W
- Archipelago: South Shetland Islands

Administration
- Administered under the Antarctic Treaty System

Demographics
- Population: Uninhabited

The Ibar Rocks are two rocks located 0.4 kilometres (0.2 nmi) east of Bonert Rock and 1 kilometre (0.6 nmi) southeast of Canto Point, Greenwich Island, in the South Shetland Islands. The names "Islote Ibar" and "Islote Teniente Ibar" appearing on Chilean hydrographic charts in the 1950s refer to the larger and western rock. The recommended name "Ibar Rocks" includes a submerged outlier to the northeast of the larger rock. Teniente (lieutenant) Mario Ibar P. signed the official act of inauguration of the Chilean Captain Arturo Prat Base on Greenwich Island in 1947.

== See also ==
- Composite Antarctic Gazetteer
- List of Antarctic islands south of 60° S
- SCAR
- Territorial claims in Antarctica

== Maps ==
- L.L. Ivanov. Antarctica: Livingston Island and Greenwich, Robert, Snow and Smith Islands. Scale 1:120000 topographic map. Troyan: Manfred Wörner Foundation, 2009. ISBN 978-954-92032-6-4
