= Serrano Point =

Ice-free point in the South Shetland Islands, Antarctica

Location of Greenwich Island in the South Shetland Islands.

Serrano Point is an ice-free point on the northwest coast of Discovery Bay, Greenwich Island in the South Shetland Islands, Antarctica named by the 1947 Chilean Antarctic Expedition after First Lieutenant Fernando Serrano, doctor on the expedition frigate Iquique.

== Location ==
The point is located at 62°27′30″S 59°43′53″W which is 1.66 km south by west of Spark Point, 4.07 km west-northwest of Ash Point, 4.31 km north of Labbé Point and 2.17 km northeast of Ortiz Point (Chilean mapping in 1951, British in 1968, and Bulgarian in 2005 and 2009).

== Maps ==
- L.L. Ivanov et al. Antarctica: Livingston Island and Greenwich Island, South Shetland Islands. Scale 1:100000 topographic map. Sofia: Antarctic Place-names Commission of Bulgaria, 2005.
- L.L. Ivanov. Antarctica: Livingston Island and Greenwich, Robert, Snow and Smith Islands. Scale 1:120000 topographic map. Troyan: Manfred Wörner Foundation, 2009. ISBN 978-954-92032-6-4
