= Guayaquil Bay =

Bay on Greenwich Island, South Shetland Islands

Location of Greenwich Island in the South Shetland Islands.

Topographic map of Livingston Island, Greenwich, Robert, Snow and Smith Islands.

Guayaquil Bay is the 2.59 km wide bay indenting for 1.25 km the north coast of Greenwich Island in the South Shetland Islands, Antarctica and entered between Agüedo Point and Orión Point. The bay is used by ships servicing the Ecuadorian Antarctic base Pedro Vicente Maldonado situated 560 m south-southwest of Orión Point. The area was visited by 19th century sealers operating from nearby Clothier Harbour.

The feature is named after the city of Guayaquil, Ecuador from where the Second Ecuadorian Antarctic Expedition departed.

== Location ==
The bay is centred at 62°26′54.8″S 59°46′01.4″W which is 2.17 km west-southwest of Spark Point (British mapping in 1968, Chilean in 1971, Argentine in 1980, and Bulgarian in 2005 and 2009).

== Maps ==
- L.L. Ivanov et al. Antarctica: Livingston Island and Greenwich Island, South Shetland Islands. Scale 1:100000 topographic map. Sofia: Antarctic Place-names Commission of Bulgaria, 2005.
- L.L. Ivanov. Antarctica: Livingston Island and Greenwich, Robert, Snow and Smith Islands. Scale 1:120000 topographic map. Troyan: Manfred Wörner Foundation, 2009. ISBN 978-954-92032-6-4
