= Jambelí Cove =

Location of Greenwich Island in the South Shetland Islands.

Jambelí Cove is the 620 metres (2,030 ft) wide cove indenting for 140 metres (460 ft) the north coast of Greenwich Island in the South Shetland Islands, Antarctica, and entered between Spark Point and Orión Point. The area was visited by 19th century seal hunters operating from nearby Clothier Harbour.

The feature is named after the Jambelí Archipelago in Ecuador.

== Location ==
The cove is centred at 62°26′40″S 59°43′57″W (British mapping in 1968, Chilean in 1971, Argentine in 1980 and Bulgarian in 2005 and 2009).

== Maps ==
- L.L. Ivanov et al. Antarctica: Livingston Island and Greenwich Island, South Shetland Islands. Scale 1:100000 topographic map. Sofia: Antarctic Place-names Commission of Bulgaria, 2005.
- L.L. Ivanov. Antarctica: Livingston Island and Greenwich, Robert, Snow and Smith Islands. Scale 1:120000 topographic map. Troyan: Manfred Wörner Foundation, 2009. ISBN 978-954-92032-6-4
