= Sotos Point =

Glaciated point in the South Shetland Islands, Antarctica

Location of Greenwich Island in the South Shetland Islands.

Sotos Point is a glaciated point projecting 180 m into the southeast part of Discovery Bay, Greenwich Island in the South Shetland Islands, Antarctica and forming the east side of the entrance to Montecinos Cove (62°29′57″S 59°40′59″W).

Sotos Point was named by the 1949-50 Chilean Antarctic Expedition after several members of the expedition with the surname Soto, while Montecinos Cove was named by the 1947 Chilean Antarctic Expedition after a member of the expedition.

== Location ==
The point is located at 62°29′46.6″S 59°40′28″W which is 3.3 km south by west of Ash Point and 1.18 km east-northeast of Ferrer Point (Chilean mapping in 1951, British in 1968, and Bulgarian in 2005 and 2009).

== Maps ==
- L.L. Ivanov et al. Antarctica: Livingston Island and Greenwich Island, South Shetland Islands. Scale 1:100000 topographic map. Sofia: Antarctic Place-names Commission of Bulgaria, 2005.
- L.L. Ivanov. Antarctica: Livingston Island and Greenwich, Robert, Snow and Smith Islands. Scale 1:120000 topographic map. Troyan: Manfred Wörner Foundation, 2009. ISBN 978-954-92032-6-4
