= Honores =

Honores is Latin for honors. It may refer to:

- Honour (fief)
- Honores Friderici, an obsolete constellation
- 7 Andromedae, a star named Honores after the constellation
- Honores Rock, a rock in Antarctica
