= Lyutitsa Nunatak =

Mountain in Antarctica

Location of Greenwich Island in the South Shetland Islands.

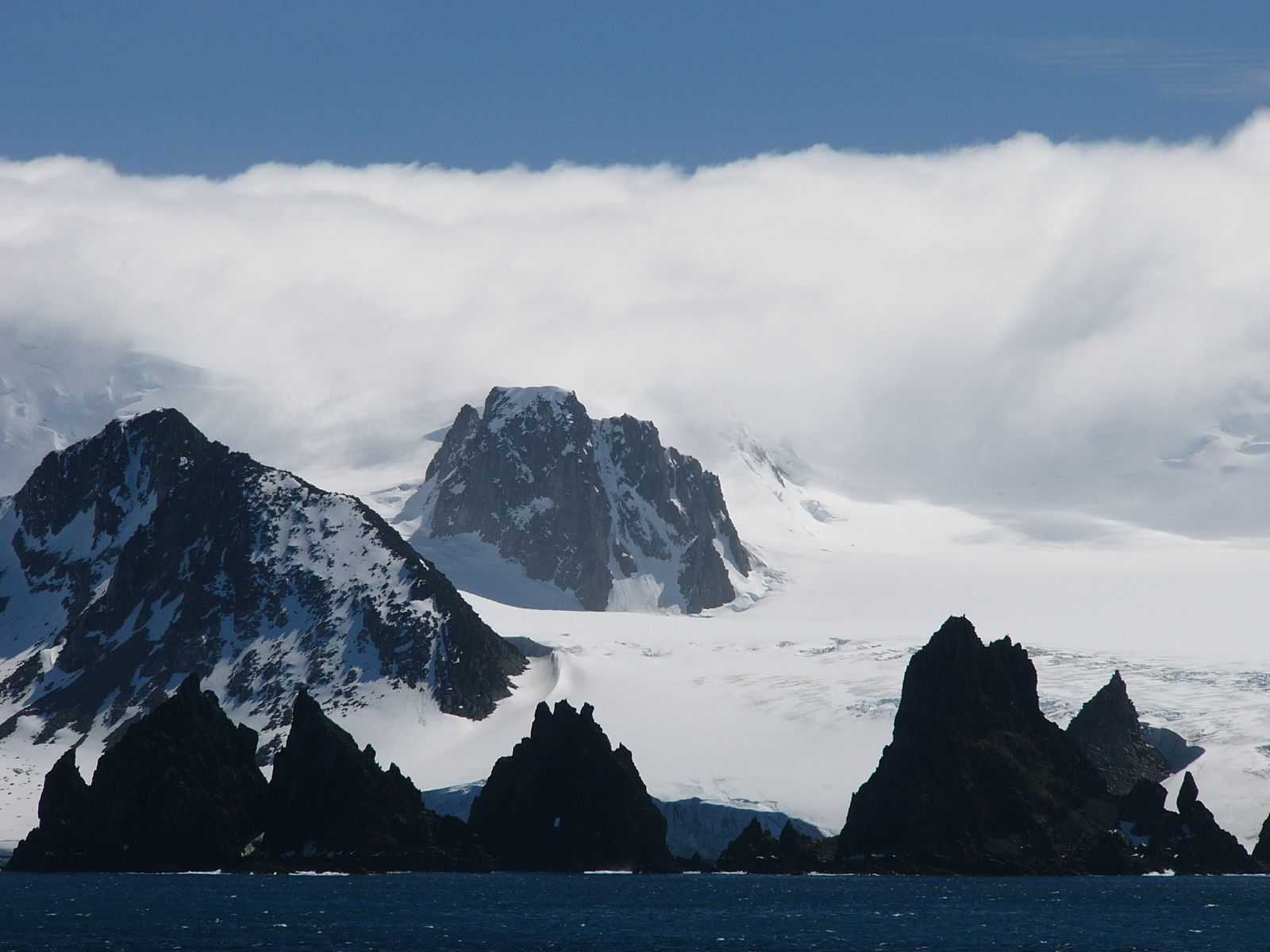
Lyutitsa Nunatak (in the background) from Bransfield Strait, with St. Kiprian Peak on the left and Fort Point in the foreground.

Topographic map of Livingston Island, Greenwich, Robert, Snow and Smith Islands.

Lyutitsa Nunatak (Nunatak Lyutitsa \'nu-na-tak lyu-'ti-tsa\) is a rocky peak of elevation 430 m projecting from the ice cap in Breznik Heights on Greenwich Island, Antarctica. Overlooking Musala Glacier to the north, east, and south. Bulgarian topographic survey Tangra 2004/05.

The feature is named after the medieval fortress of Lyutitsa in the Eastern Rhodope Mountains, Bulgaria.

== Location ==
The peak is located at 62°31′51″S 59°38′06″W which is 1.81 km west-southwest of Ilarion Ridge, 2.56 km east by north of Momchil Peak, and 1.08 km north of Vratsa Peak (Bulgarian mapping in 2009).

== Maps ==
- L.L. Ivanov et al. Antarctica: Livingston Island and Greenwich Island, South Shetland Islands. Scale 1:100000 topographic map. Sofia: Antarctic Place-names Commission of Bulgaria, 2005.
- L.L. Ivanov. Antarctica: Livingston Island and Greenwich, Robert, Snow and Smith Islands. Scale 1:120000 topographic map. Troyan: Manfred Wörner Foundation, 2009. ISBN 978-954-92032-6-4
