= Fierro Point =

Point in the South Shetland Islands, Antarctica

Location of Greenwich Island in the South Shetland Islands.

Fierro Point is a point projecting 400 m into the south part of Discovery Bay from Parvomay Neck, Greenwich Island in the South Shetland Islands, Antarctica. The point forms the south side of the entrance to Basullo Cove (62°29′58.4″S 59°43′57″W) and the northwest side of the entrance to Ramos Cove (62°30′18.3″S 59°43′45″W).

The features were named by the 1947-48 Chilean Antarctic Expedition after crewmen of the expedition frigate Iquique: Torpedoman Fierro, Mechanics NCO Abraham Basullo and Signalman Ramos.

== Location ==
The point is located at 62°30′04.1″S 59°43′41.5″W which is 480 m south-southeast of Labbé Point and 700 m northwest of Correa Point (Chilean mapping in 1951, British in 1968, and Bulgarian in 2005 and 2009).

== Maps ==
- L.L. Ivanov et al. Antarctica: Livingston Island and Greenwich Island, South Shetland Islands. Scale 1:100000 topographic map. Sofia: Antarctic Place-names Commission of Bulgaria, 2005.
- L.L. Ivanov. Antarctica: Livingston Island and Greenwich, Robert, Snow and Smith Islands. Scale 1:120000 topographic map. Troyan: Manfred Wörner Foundation, 2009. ISBN 978-954-92032-6-4
