= Hardy Cove =

Location of Greenwich Island in the South Shetland Islands.

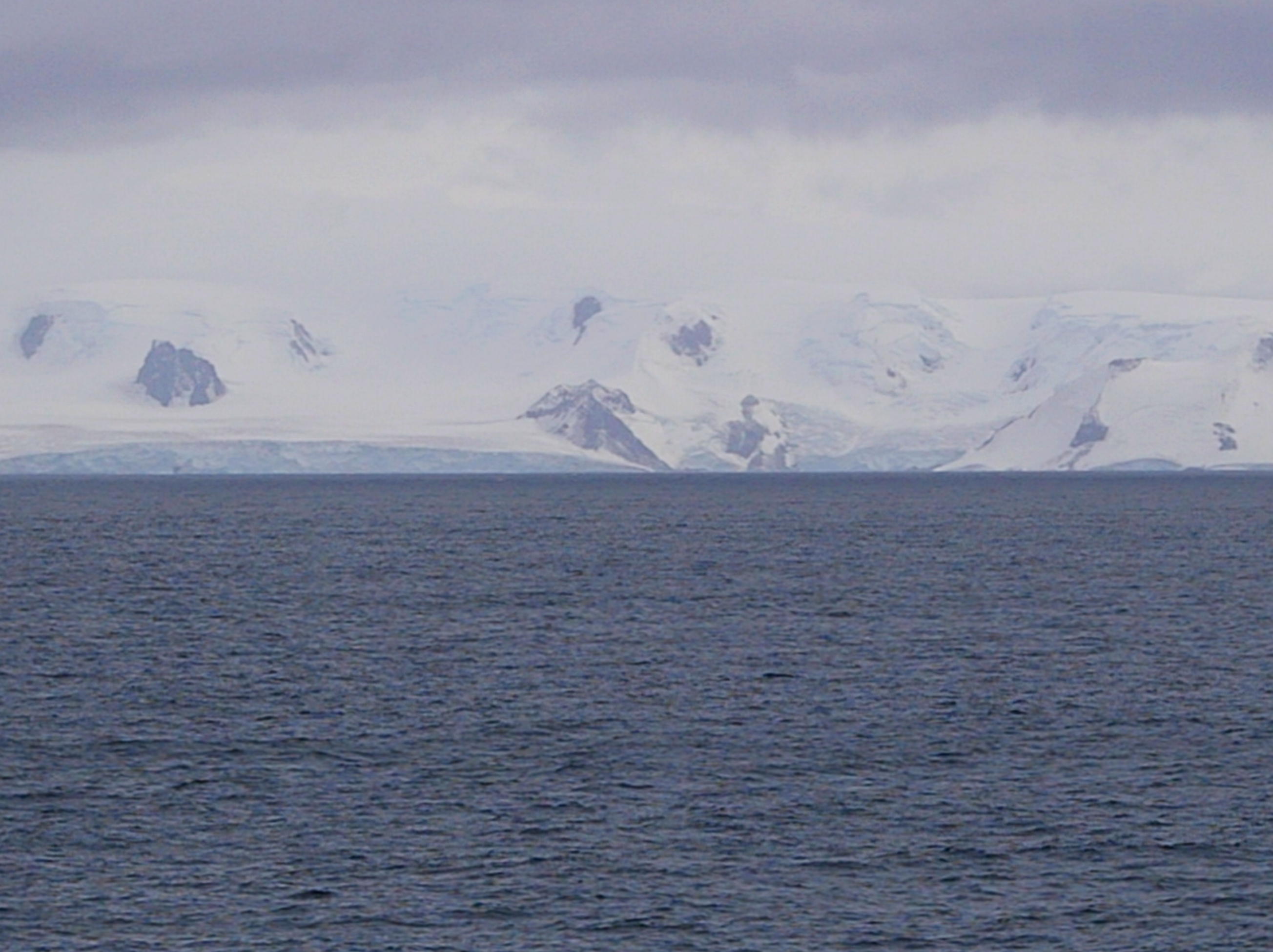
Hardy Cove (on the right) from Bransfield Strait.

Topographic map of Livingston Island, Greenwich, Robert, Snow and Smith Islands.

Hardy Cove is the 950 m wide cove indenting for 1.37 km the east coast of Greenwich Island in the South Shetland Islands, Antarctica and surmounted by Parchevich Ridge to the north and Ilarion Ridge to the south. The cove was known to the early 19th century sealers.

The cove is named after Admiral Sir Thomas Hardy, (1769–1839), Flag Captain in HMS Victory at the Battle of Trafalgar and First Sea Lord in 1830-34; the name was originally applied by Captain Robert Fildes to nearby Sartorius Point.

== Location ==
Hardy Cove is centred at 62°31′08″S 59°35′34″W which is 2.89 km southwest of Santa Cruz Point and 2.84 km north-northwest of Fort Point (British mapping in 1821, 1935, 1962 and 1968, Chilean in 1971, Argentine in 1980, and Bulgarian in 2005 and 2009).

== Maps ==
- L.L. Ivanov et al. Antarctica: Livingston Island and Greenwich Island, South Shetland Islands. Scale 1:100000 topographic map. Sofia: Antarctic Place-names Commission of Bulgaria, 2005.
- L.L. Ivanov. Antarctica: Livingston Island and Greenwich, Robert, Snow and Smith Islands. Scale 1:120000 topographic map. Troyan: Manfred Wörner Foundation, 2009. ISBN 978-954-92032-6-4
