= Honores Rock =

- Location within Antarctica

Geography
- Location: Antarctica
- Coordinates: 62°30′S 59°43′W

Administration
- Administered under the Antarctic Treaty System

Demographics
- Population: Uninhabited

Honores Rock is a rock lying 1 kilometre (0.5 nmi) southwest of Ferrer Point in Discovery Bay, Greenwich Island, in the South Shetland Islands. The name derives from the forms "Islote Honores" and "Islote Cocinero Honores" given by the Chilean Antarctic Expedition (1947) after the cook of the expedition ship Iquique.
