= Gruev Cove =

Location of Greenwich Island in the South Shetland Islands.

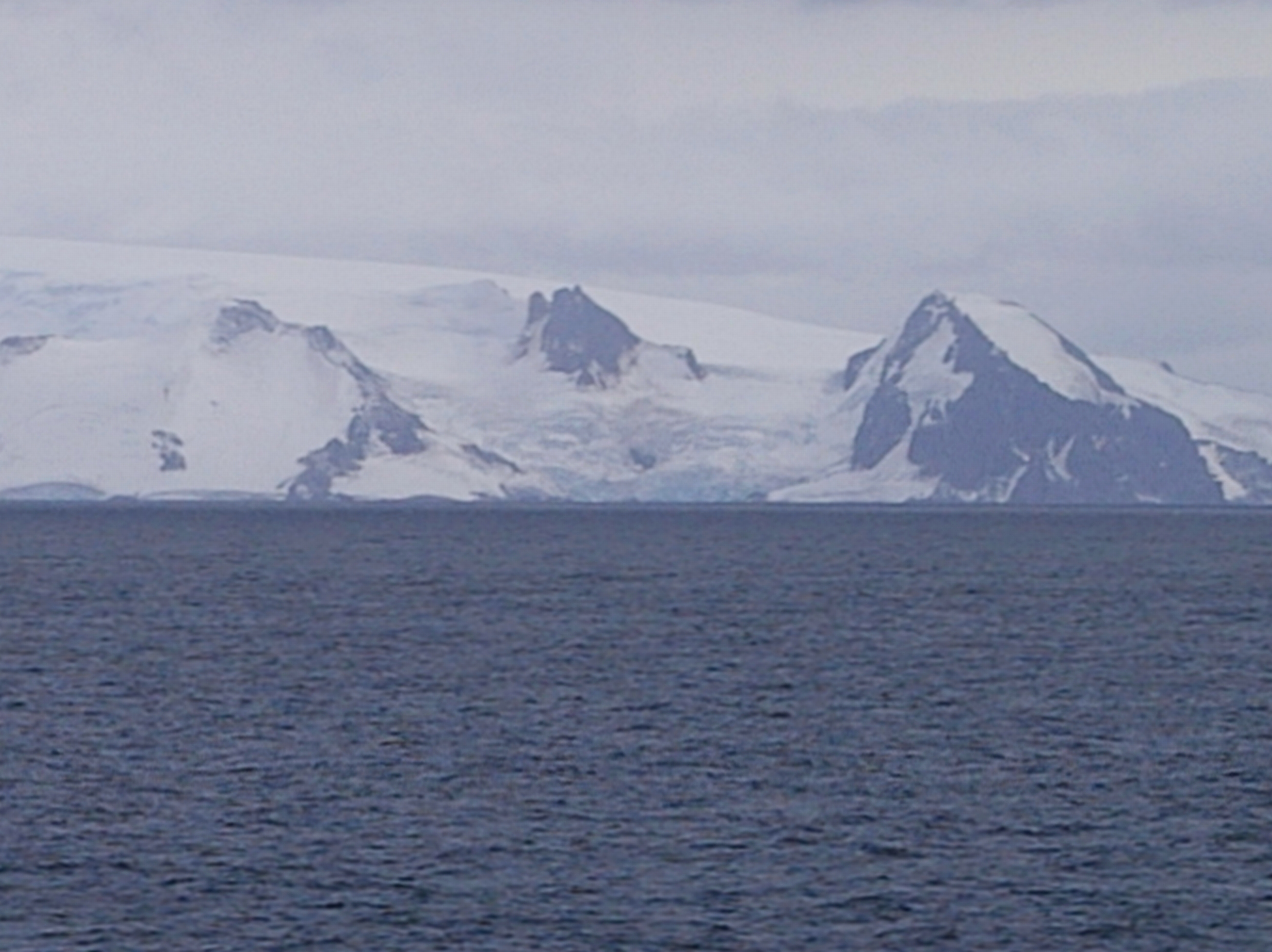
Gruev Cove from Bransfield Strait, with Parchevich Ridge on the left and Bogdan Ridge on the right.

Topographic map of Livingston Island, Greenwich, Robert, Snow and Smith Islands.

Gruev Cove (Bulgarian: Груев залив, romanized: Gruev zaliv, IPA: [ˈɡruɛv ˈzalif]) is the 300 m wide cove indenting for 650 m the east coast of Greenwich Island, in the South Shetland Islands south of Santa Cruz Point and north of Parchevich Ridge. It is surmounted by Bogdan Ridge to the north and Benkovski Nunatak to the west. The cove was formed as a result of glacier retreat in the second half of 20th century.

The cove is named "after Dame Gruev (1871–1906), a leader of the Bulgarian liberation movement in Macedonia".

== Location ==
Gruev Cove is centred at 62°30′22″S 59°33′46″W. British mapping in 1968.

== Maps ==
- L.L. Ivanov et al. Antarctica: Livingston Island and Greenwich Island, South Shetland Islands. Scale 1:100000 topographic map. Sofia: Antarctic Place-names.
- L.L. Ivanov. Antarctica: Livingston Island and Greenwich, Robert, Snow and Smith Islands. Scale 1:120000 topographic map. Troyan: Manfred Wörner Foundation, 2009. ISBN 978-954-92032-6-4
