= Fort Point =

Fort Point may refer to:

- Fort Point, Boston, Massachusetts
- Fort Point, Newfoundland and Labrador, Canada
- Fort Point National Historic Site, San Francisco, California
- Fort Point (Greenwich Island), Antarctica
