= Labbé Point =

Point in the South Shetland Islands, Antarctica

- Location of Greenwich Island in the South Shetland Islands

- Location within Antarctic Peninsula Location within Antarctica

Geography
- Location: Antarctica
- Coordinates: 62°29′49.5″S 59°43′52.3″W
- Archipelago: South Shetland Islands
- Length: 0.6 km (0.37 mi)

Administration
- Administered under the Antarctic Treaty System

Demographics
- Population: Uninhabited

Topographic map of Livingston Island, Greenwich, Robert, Snow and Smith Islands.

Labbé Point is a point projecting 600 m (660 yd) into the southwest part of Discovery Bay from Parvomay Neck, Greenwich Island in the South Shetland Islands, Antarctica with an adjacent ice-free area of 11 hectares (27 acres). The point forms the northwest side of the entrance to Basullo Cove and the east side of the entrance to Vinett Cove (62°29′42″S 59°44′55″W). The small Basso Island (62°29′38.9″S 59°44′02″W) is linked by a mainly submerged spit to the north side of Labbé Point.

The features were charted and named by the 1947 Chilean Antarctic Expedition after members of the expedition: Lieutenant Custodio Labbé, navigation officer of the transport ship Angamos; Vinett, the boatswain of the expedition; and Juan Basso, chief storekeeper on the frigate Iquique.

== Location ==
The point is located at 62°29′49.5″S 59°43′52.3″W which is 5.08 km (3.16 mi) southwest of Ash Point, 1.79 km (1.11 mi) west by north of Ferrer Point, 1.3 km (0.81 mi) east-southeast of Riquelme Point, 3 km (1.9 mi) south-southeast of Ortiz Point and 5.97 km (3.71 mi) south of Spark Point (Chilean mapping in 1951, British in 1968, and Bulgarian in 2005 and 2009).

== Maps ==
- L.L. Ivanov et al. Antarctica: Livingston Island and Greenwich Island, South Shetland Islands. Scale 1:100000 topographic map. Sofia: Antarctic Place-names Commission of Bulgaria, 2005.

== See also ==
- Composite Antarctic Gazetteer
- List of Antarctic islands south of 60° S
- SCAR
- Territorial claims in Antarctica
