= Benkovski Nunatak =

Peak on Greenwich Island, Antarctica

Coordinates: 62°30′13″S 59°34′56″W

Location of Greenwich Island in the South Shetland Islands.

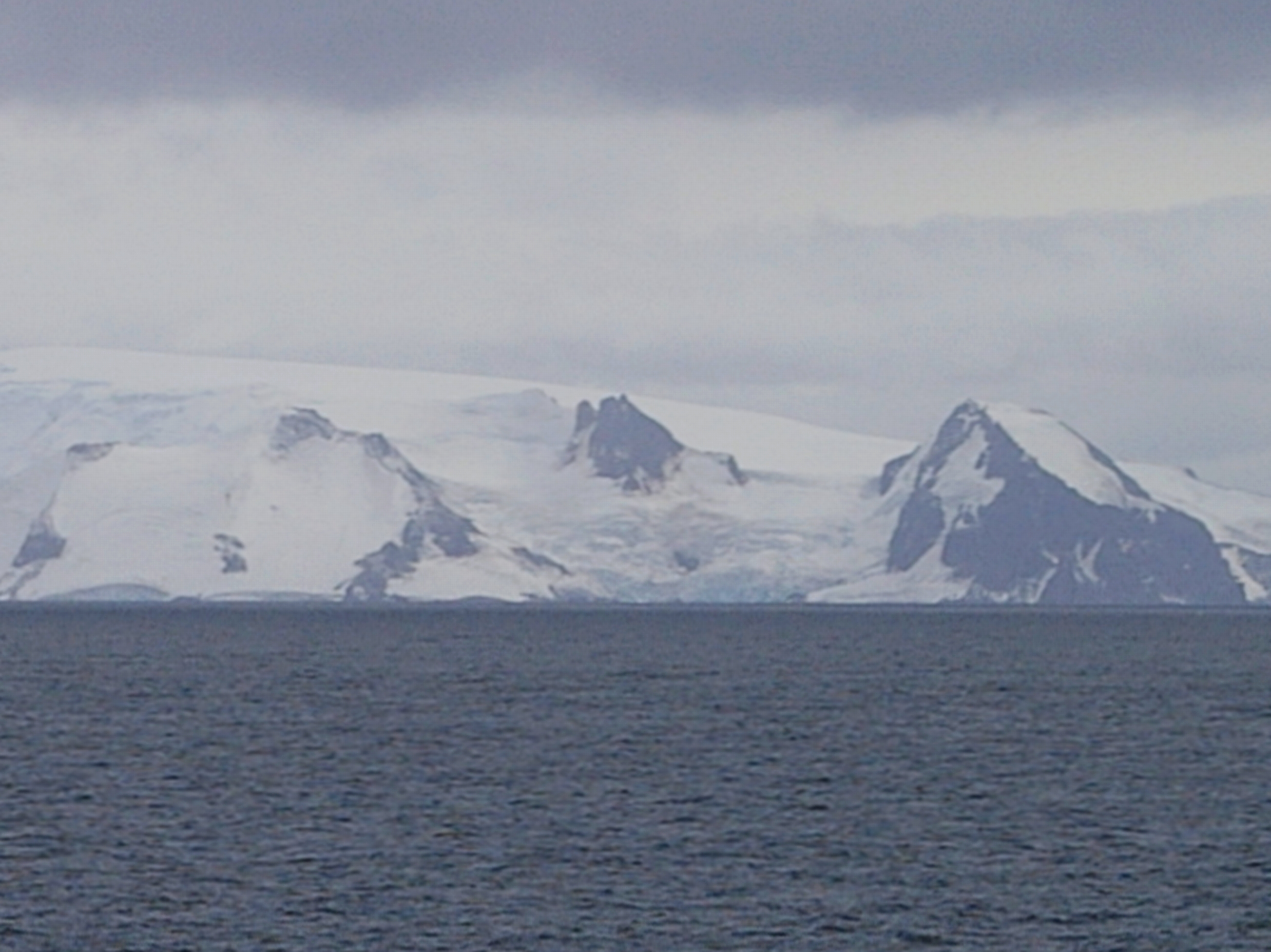
Benkovski Nunatak from Bransfield Strait, with Parchevich Ridge on the left and Bogdan Ridge on the right.

Topographic map of Livingston Island, Greenwich, Robert, Snow and Smith Islands.

Benkovski Nunatak (\ben-'kov-ski 'nu-na-tak\) is a rocky peak of elevation 450 m projecting from the ice cap of Greenwich Island in the northeast extremity of Breznik Heights.

The peak was named after Georgi Benkovski (1843–76), a leader of the 1876 April Uprising for Bulgarian independence.

== Location ==
Benkovski Nunatak is located at, which is 920 m west-southwest of Bogdan Ridge, and 690 m north of Parchevich Ridge. Overlooking Gruev Cove to the east. Bulgarian topographic survey Tangra 2004/05.

== Maps ==
- L.L. Ivanov. Antarctica: Livingston Island and Greenwich, Robert, Snow and Smith Islands. Scale 1:120000 topographic map. Troyan: Manfred Wörner Foundation, 2009. ISBN 978-954-92032-6-4
