= Vratsa Peak =

Sharp rocky peak in the South Shetland Islands, Antarctica

Location of Greenwich Island in the South Shetland Islands.

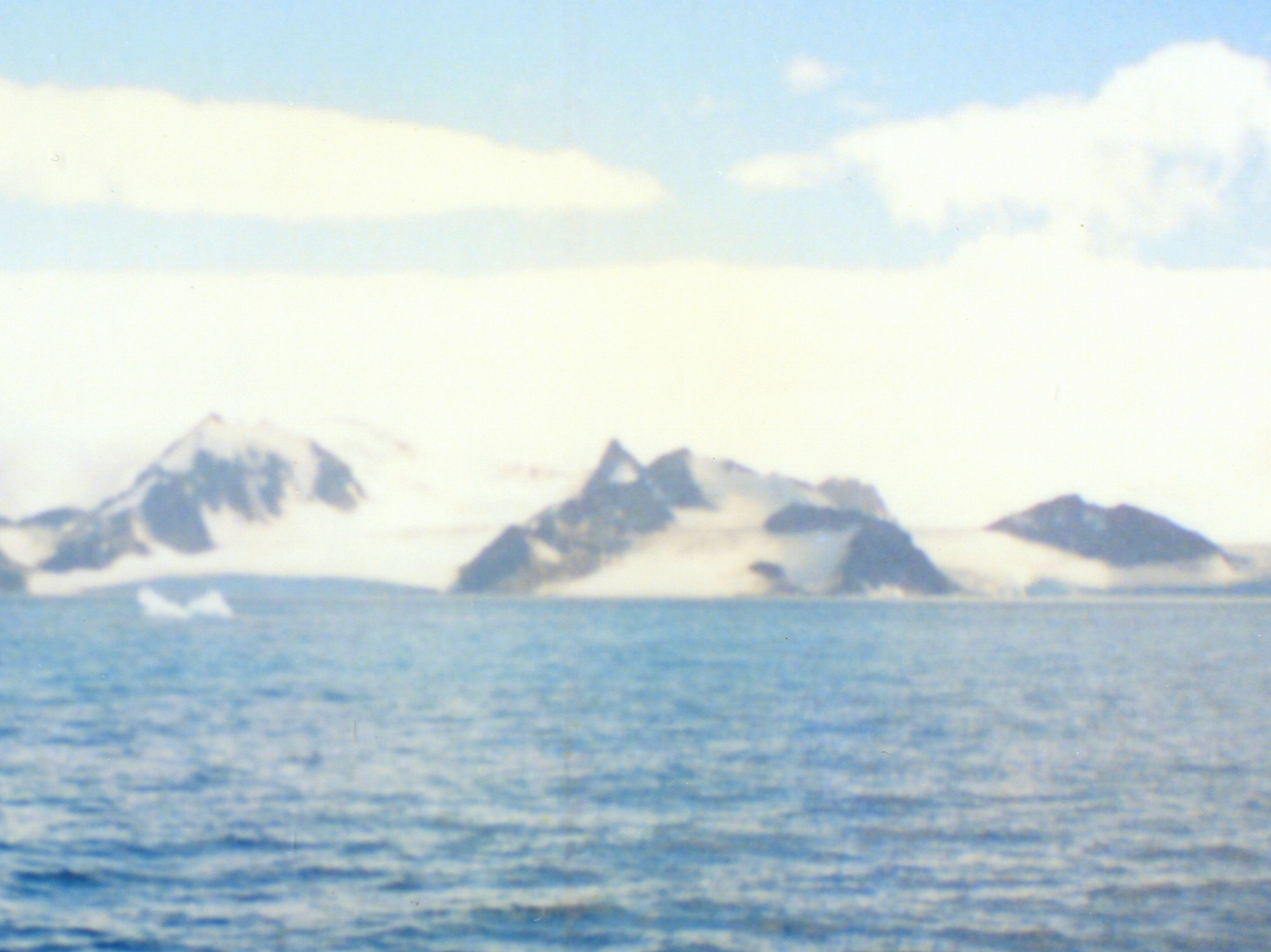
Vratsa Peak (the sharp one in the centre) from Bransfield Strait, with Viskyar Ridge on the left and St. Kiprian Peak on the right.

Topographic map of Livingston Island, Greenwich, Robert, Snow and Smith Islands.

Vratsa Peak (Bulgarian: връх Враца, romanized: vrah Vratsa, IPA: [ˈvrɤɣ ˈvrat͡sɐ]) is a sharp rocky peak rising to 470 m in Breznik Heights, Greenwich Island in the South Shetland Islands, Antarctica surmounting Musala Glacier to the northeast and Targovishte Glacier to the southwest and south.

The feature is named after the city of Vratsa in northwestern Bulgaria.

== Location ==
The peak is located at 62°32′26″S 59°38′09″W, which is 1.14 km east of the summit of Viskyar Ridge, 1.1 km south of Lyutitsa Nunatak, 1.54 km west of St. Kiprian Peak, 3.13 km west of Fort Point and 2.38 km northeast of Sartorius Point (Bulgarian topographic survey Tangra 2004/05 and mapping in 2009).

== Maps ==
- L.L. Ivanov et al. Antarctica: Livingston Island and Greenwich Island, South Shetland Islands. Scale 1:100000 topographic map. Sofia: Antarctic Place-names Commission of Bulgaria, 2005.
- L.L. Ivanov. Antarctica: Livingston Island and Greenwich, Robert, Snow and Smith Islands. Scale 1:120000 topographic map. Troyan: Manfred Wörner Foundation, 2009. ISBN 978-954-92032-6-4
