= Galápagos Cove =

Location of Greenwich Island in the South Shetland Islands.

Galápagos Cove is the small, 210 m wide cove indenting for 70 m the northeast coast of Greenwich Island in the South Shetland Islands, Antarctica and entered between Spark Point and Figueroa Point.

The feature is named after the Galápagos Islands, Ecuador.

== Location ==
The bay is centred at 62°26′39.8″S 59°43′33″W (British mapping in 1968, Chilean in 1971, Argentine in 1980, and Bulgarian in 2005 and 2009).

== Maps ==
- L.L. Ivanov et al. Antarctica: Livingston Island and Greenwich Island, South Shetland Islands. Scale 1:100000 topographic map. Sofia: Antarctic Place-names Commission of Bulgaria, 2005.
- L.L. Ivanov. Antarctica: Livingston Island and Greenwich, Robert, Snow and Smith Islands. Scale 1:120000 topographic map. Troyan: Manfred Wörner Foundation, 2009. ISBN 978-954-92032-6-4
