= Parchevich Ridge =

Ridge on Greenwich Island, Antarctica

Coordinates: 62°30′35″S 59°34′47″W

Location of Greenwich Island in the South Shetland Islands.

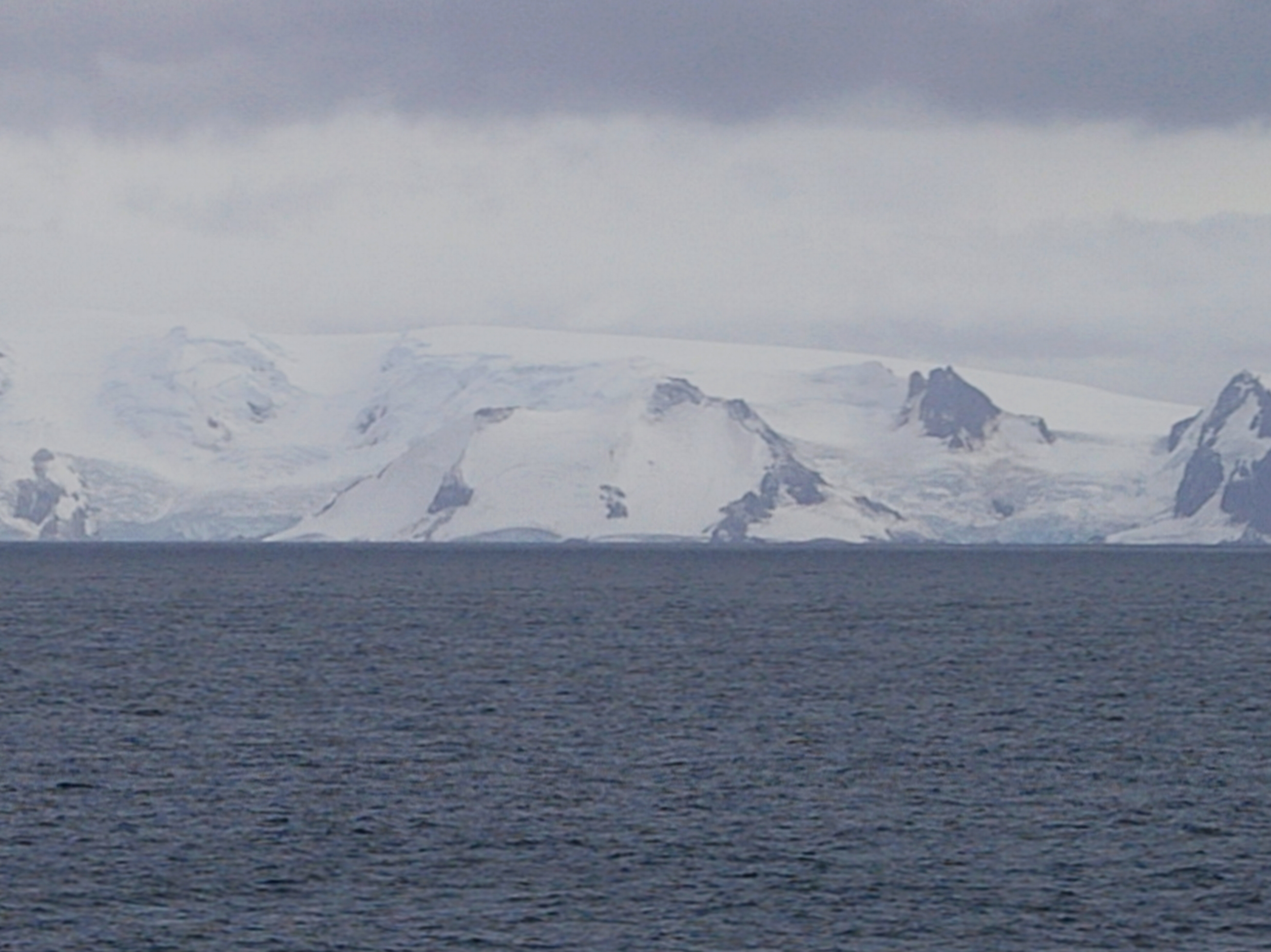
Parchevich Ridge from Bransfield Strait.

Topographic map of Livingston Island, Greenwich, Robert, Snow and Smith Islands.

Parchevich Ridge (Parchevich Rid \'par-che-vich 'rid\) is a partly ice-free ridge of elevation 370 m situated in Breznik Heights north of Hardy Cove, 690 m south of Benkovski Nunatak, and 1.7 km southwest of Santa Cruz Point on Greenwich Island, Antarctica. Surmounting Hardy Cove to the southwest and Gruev Cove to the east-northeast. Bulgarian topographic survey Tangra 2004/05. Named after Petar Parchevich (1612–74), a Bulgarian Catholic bishop and diplomat who campaigned for Bulgarian independence in 1630–45.

== Maps ==
- L.L. Ivanov et al. Antarctica: Livingston Island and Greenwich Island, South Shetland Islands. Scale 1:100000 topographic map. Sofia: Antarctic Place-names Commission of Bulgaria, 2005.
- L.L. Ivanov. Antarctica: Livingston Island and Greenwich, Robert, Snow and Smith Islands. Scale 1:120000 topographic map. Troyan: Manfred Wörner Foundation, 2009. ISBN 978-954-92032-6-4
