= Bogdan Ridge =

Location of Greenwich Island in the South Shetland Islands.

Topographic map of Livingston Island, Greenwich, Robert, Snow and Smith Islands.

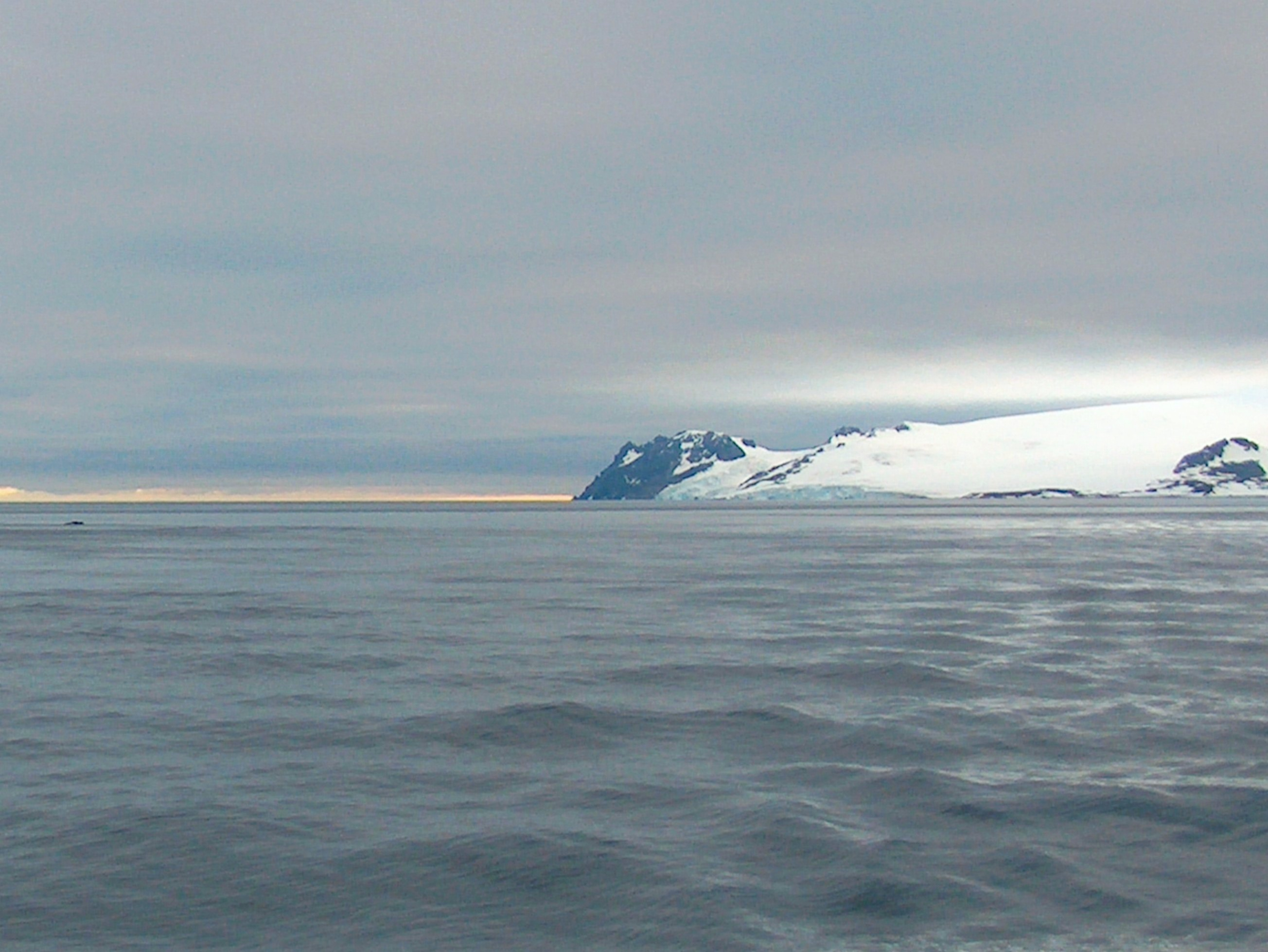
Bogdan Ridge from English Strait.

Bogdan Ridge (Rid Bogdan \'rid 'bog-dan\) is a conspicuous rocky ridge of elevation 440 m forming the northeast extremity of Breznik Heights, Greenwich Island in the South Shetland Islands, Antarctica. The ridge extends 1.3 km westwards from Santa Cruz Point and surmounts Gruev Cove to the south.

The feature is named after Bogdan Peak, the summit of Sredna Gora Mountain in Central Bulgaria.

== Location ==
The summit of the ridge is located at 62°30′01″S 59°33′57″W which is 630 m west of Santa Cruz Point, 920 m east-northeast of Benkovski Nunatak and 4.38 km southeast of López Nunatak (British mapping in 1968, and Bulgarian in 2005 and 2009).

== Maps ==
- L.L. Ivanov et al. Antarctica: Livingston Island and Greenwich Island, South Shetland Islands. Scale 1:100000 topographic map. Sofia: Antarctic Place-names Commission of Bulgaria, 2005.
- L.L. Ivanov. Antarctica: Livingston Island and Greenwich, Robert, Snow and Smith Islands. Scale 1:120000 topographic map. Troyan: Manfred Wörner Foundation, 2009.
