= Orión Point =

Location of Greenwich Island in the South Shetland Islands.

Topographic map of Livingston Island, Greenwich, Robert, Snow and Smith Islands.

Orión Point is an ice-free point on the north coast of Greenwich Island in the South Shetland Islands, Antarctica forming the east side of the entrance to Guayaquil Bay. The feature is named after the Ecuadorian Antarctic Expedition's ship Orión.

== Location ==
The point is located at 62°26′39″S 59°44′18″W which is 620 m west by south of Spark Point, 2.59 km east by south of Agüedo Point and 2.56 km southeast of Dee Island (British mapping in 1968, and Bulgarian in 2005 and 2009).

== Maps ==
- L.L. Ivanov et al. Antarctica: Livingston Island and Greenwich Island, South Shetland Islands. Scale 1:100000 topographic map. Sofia: Antarctic Place-names Commission of Bulgaria, 2005.
- L.L. Ivanov. Antarctica: Livingston Island and Greenwich, Robert, Snow and Smith Islands. Scale 1:120000 topographic map. Troyan: Manfred Wörner Foundation, 2009. ISBN 978-954-92032-6-4
