= St. Kiprian Peak =

Rocky peak on Greenwich Island, Antarctica

Coordinates: 62°32′23.4″S 59°36′22″W

Location of Greenwich Island in the South Shetland Islands.

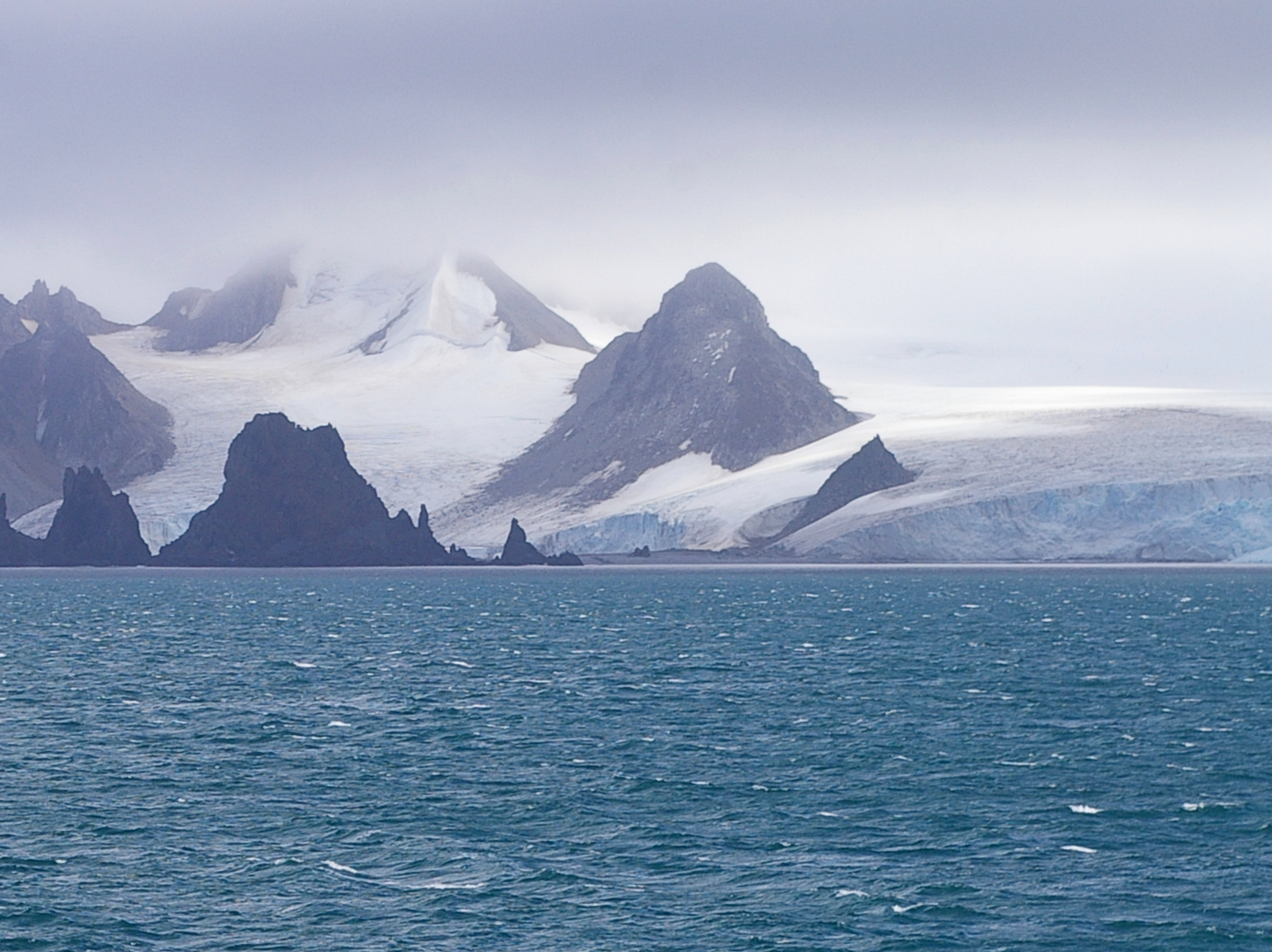
St. Kiprian Peak from Bransfield Strait, with Fort Point in the foreground.

Topographic map of Livingston Island, Greenwich, Robert, Snow and Smith Islands.

St. Kiprian Peak (Bulgarian: връх Св. Киприан, romanized: vrah Sv. Kiprian, IPA: [ˈvrɤx svɛˈti kipriˈan]) is a rocky peak of elevation 270 m in the southeast extremity of Breznik Heights on Greenwich Island, Antarctica. Situated 1.54 km east of Vratsa Peak, 1.7 km south of Ilarion Ridge, 1.63 km west of Fort Point, and 800 m northeast of Kormesiy Peak. Overlooking Musala Glacier to the north. Bulgarian topographic survey Tangra 2004/05.

The feature is named after the Bulgarian clergyman Kiprian Tsamblak (1330-1406), Metropolitan of Kiev, Moscow and all Russia.

== Maps ==
- L.L. Ivanov et al. Antarctica: Livingston Island and Greenwich Island, South Shetland Islands. Scale 1:100000 topographic map. Sofia: Antarctic Place-names Commission of Bulgaria, 2005.
- L.L. Ivanov. Antarctica: Livingston Island and Greenwich, Robert, Snow and Smith Islands. Scale 1:120000 topographic map. Troyan: Manfred Wörner Foundation, 2009. ISBN 978-954-92032-6-4
