= Fuerza Aérea Glacier =

Glacier in Antarctica

- Location of Greenwich Island in the South Shetland Islands

- Location within South Shetland Islands Location within Antarctica
- Location: Greenwich Island; South Shetland Islands
- Coordinates: 62°30′25″S 59°39′40″W
- Length: 2.8 nmi (5 km; 3 mi)
- Width: 1.2 nmi (2 km; 1 mi)
- Thickness: unknown
- Terminus: Discovery Bay
- Status: unknown

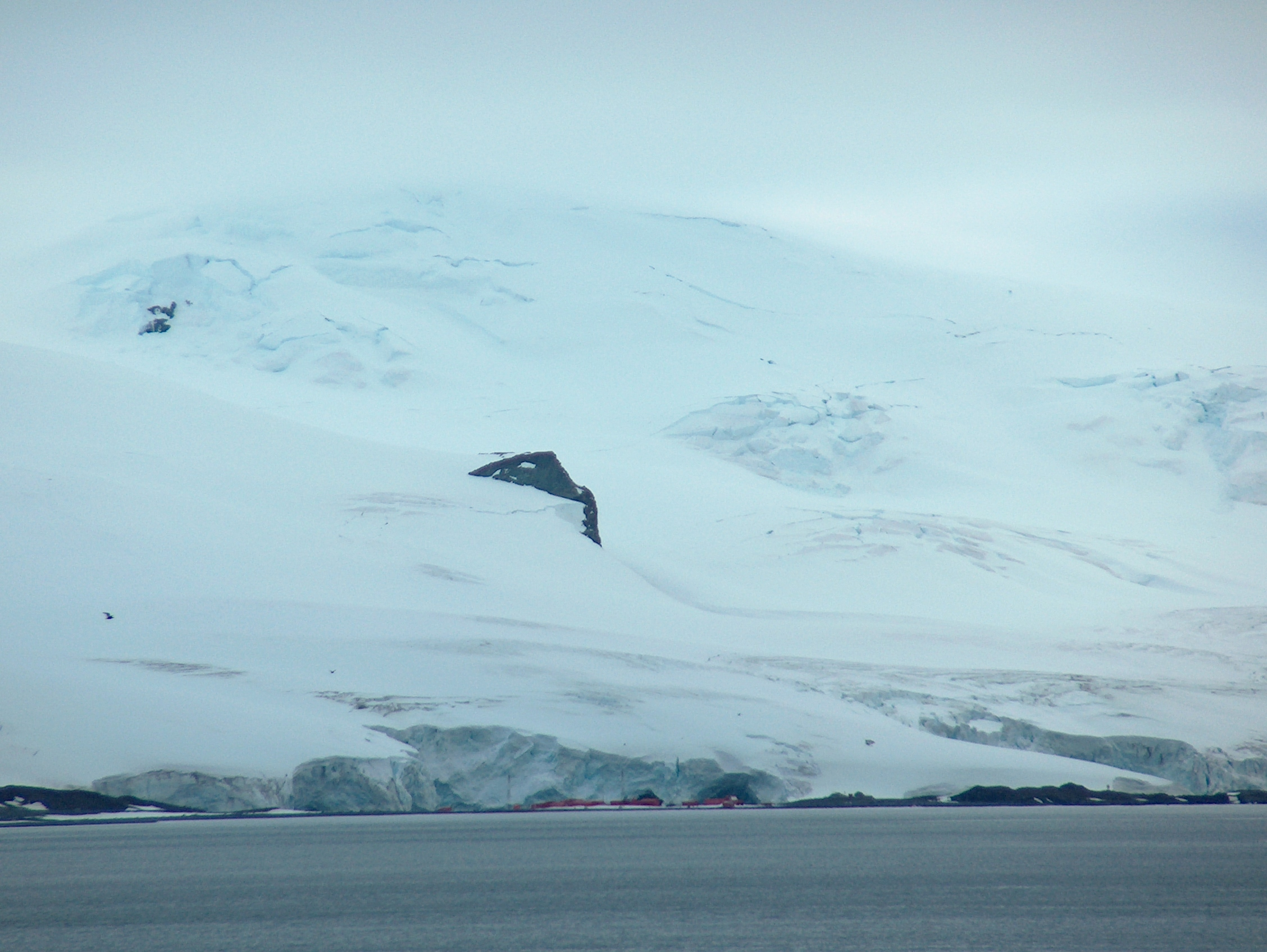
Fuerza Aérea Glacier from English Strait, with Arturo Prat Base in the foreground and Rousseau Peak rising from the glacier.

Topographic map of Livingston Island and Smith Island

Fuerza Aérea Glacier is a glacier on Greenwich Island in the South Shetland Islands, Antarctica, extending 4.5 kilometres (2.8 mi) in a northeast–southwest direction and 2 kilometres (1.2 mi) in a southeast–northwest direction and draining the northwest slopes of the Breznik Heights to flow northwestwards into Discovery Bay.

It was named "Glaciar Fuerza Aérea" (Air Force Glacier) by the 1947 Chilean Antarctic Expedition for the Chilean Air Force.

== Location ==
The glacier is centred at 62°30′25″S 59°39′40″W (Bulgarian mapping in 2005 and 2009).

Note: the United States Geological Survey has alternative coordinates of 62°30′S 59°38′W.

== Maps ==
- L.L. Ivanov et al. Antarctica: Livingston Island and Greenwich Island, South Shetland Islands. Scale 1:100000 topographic map. Sofia: Antarctic Place-names Commission of Bulgaria, 2005.
- L.L. Ivanov. Antarctica: Livingston Island and Greenwich, Robert, Snow and Smith Islands. Scale 1:120000 topographic map. Troyan: Manfred Wörner Foundation, 2009. ISBN 978-954-92032-6-4
