= Ferrer Point =

Point in the South Shetland Islands, Antarctica

Location of Greenwich Island in the South Shetland Islands.

Topographic map of Livingston Island, Greenwich, Robert, Snow and Smith Islands.

Ferrer Point is a point projecting 700 m into the south part of Discovery Bay, Greenwich Island in the South Shetland Islands, Antarctica with an adjacent ice-free area of 24 hectares (59 acres). The point forms the west side of the entrance to Montecinos Cove and the northeast side of the entrance to Rodríguez Cove (62°30′24.4″S 59°42′25″W).

The point was charted by the 1950-51 Chilean Antarctic Expedition and named after First Lieutenant Fernando Ferrer, hydrographic officer on the transport ship Angamos during the expedition, while the cove was named by the 1947 Chilean Antarctic Expedition after Captain Rodríguez, Operations Officer of the expedition.

== Location ==
The point is located at 62°29′56″S 59°41′47.5″W which is 4.03 km south-southwest of Ash Point, 1.79 km east by south of Labbé Point and 6.36 km south-southeast of Spark Point (Chilean mapping in 1947, 1951 and 1961, British in 1965 and 1968, and Bulgarian in 2005 and 2009).

== Map ==
- L.L. Ivanov et al. Antarctica: Livingston Island and Greenwich Island, South Shetland Islands. Scale 1:100000 topographic map. Sofia: Antarctic Place-names Commission of Bulgaria, 2005.
