= Santa Cruz Point =

Location of Greenwich Island in the South Shetland Islands.

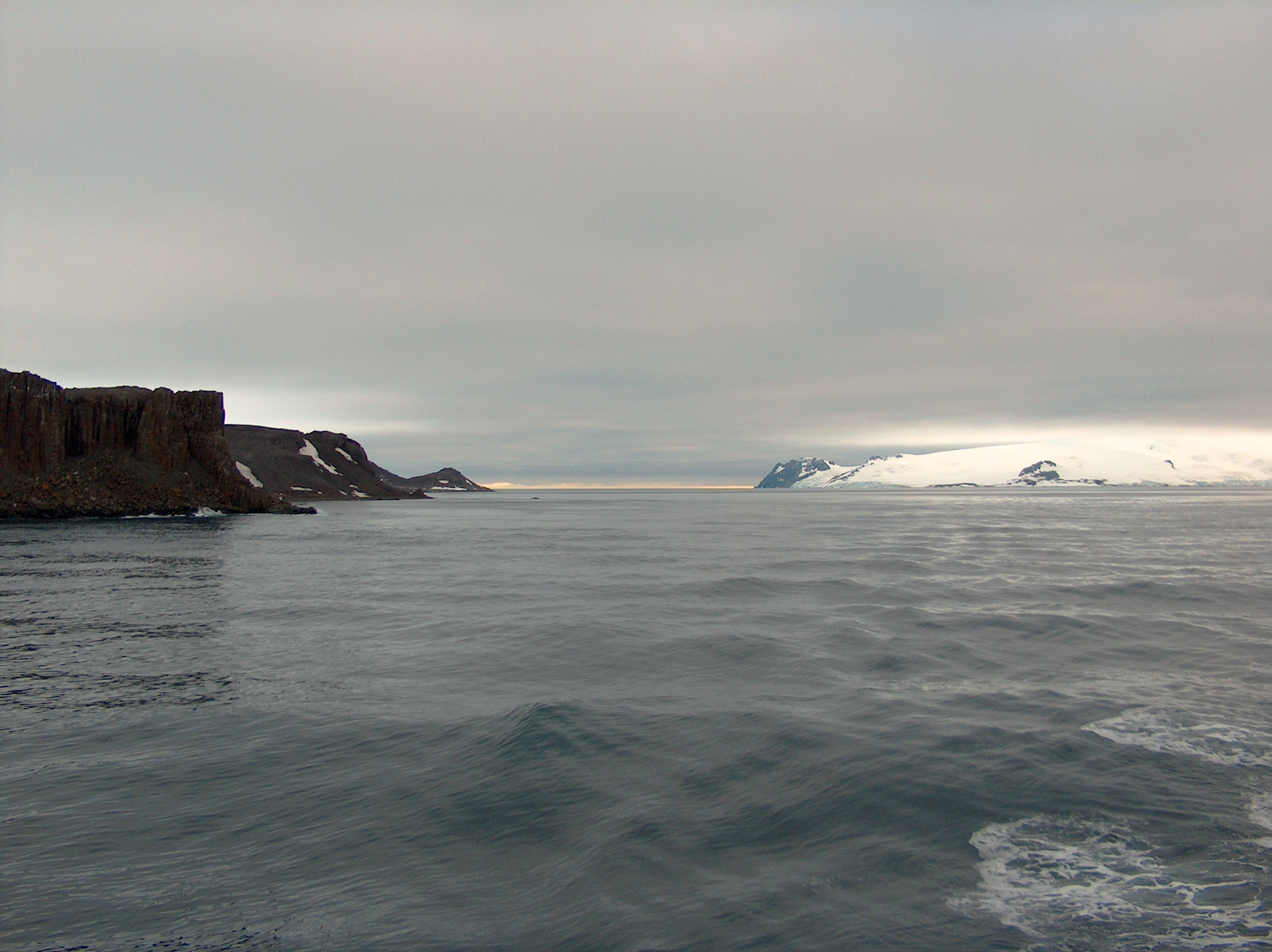
Santa Cruz Point (on the right) from English Strait.

Topographic map of Livingston Island, Greenwich, Robert, Snow and Smith Islands.

Santa Cruz Point, also Spencer Bluff, is a rocky point forming the east extremity of Greenwich Island in the South Shetland Islands, Antarctica and the southwest side of the entrance to English Strait. Surmounted by Bogdan Ridge on the west.

The name appears on a 1949 Argentine chart, probably for the Argentine vessel Santa Cruz that visited the South Shetlands in 1948.

== Location ==
The point is located at 62°30′01″S 59°33′13″W which is 4.9 km north by east of Fort Point, 6.35 km southeast of Ash Point, 6.53 km south of Beron Point, Robert Island and 5 km southwest of Edwards Point, Robert Island. British mapping in 1968, Chilean in 1971, Argentine in 1980, and Bulgarian in 2005 and 2009.

== Maps ==
- L.L. Ivanov et al. Antarctica: Livingston Island and Greenwich Island, South Shetland Islands. Scale 1:100000 topographic map. Sofia: Antarctic Place-names Commission of Bulgaria, 2005.
- L.L. Ivanov. Antarctica: Livingston Island and Greenwich, Robert, Snow and Smith Islands. Scale 1:120000 topographic map. Troyan: Manfred Wörner Foundation, 2009. ISBN 978-954-92032-6-4
