= Captain Arturo Prat Base =

Prat Station Base Naval Antártica "Arturo Prat"
- Antarctic base
- Arturo Prat Station
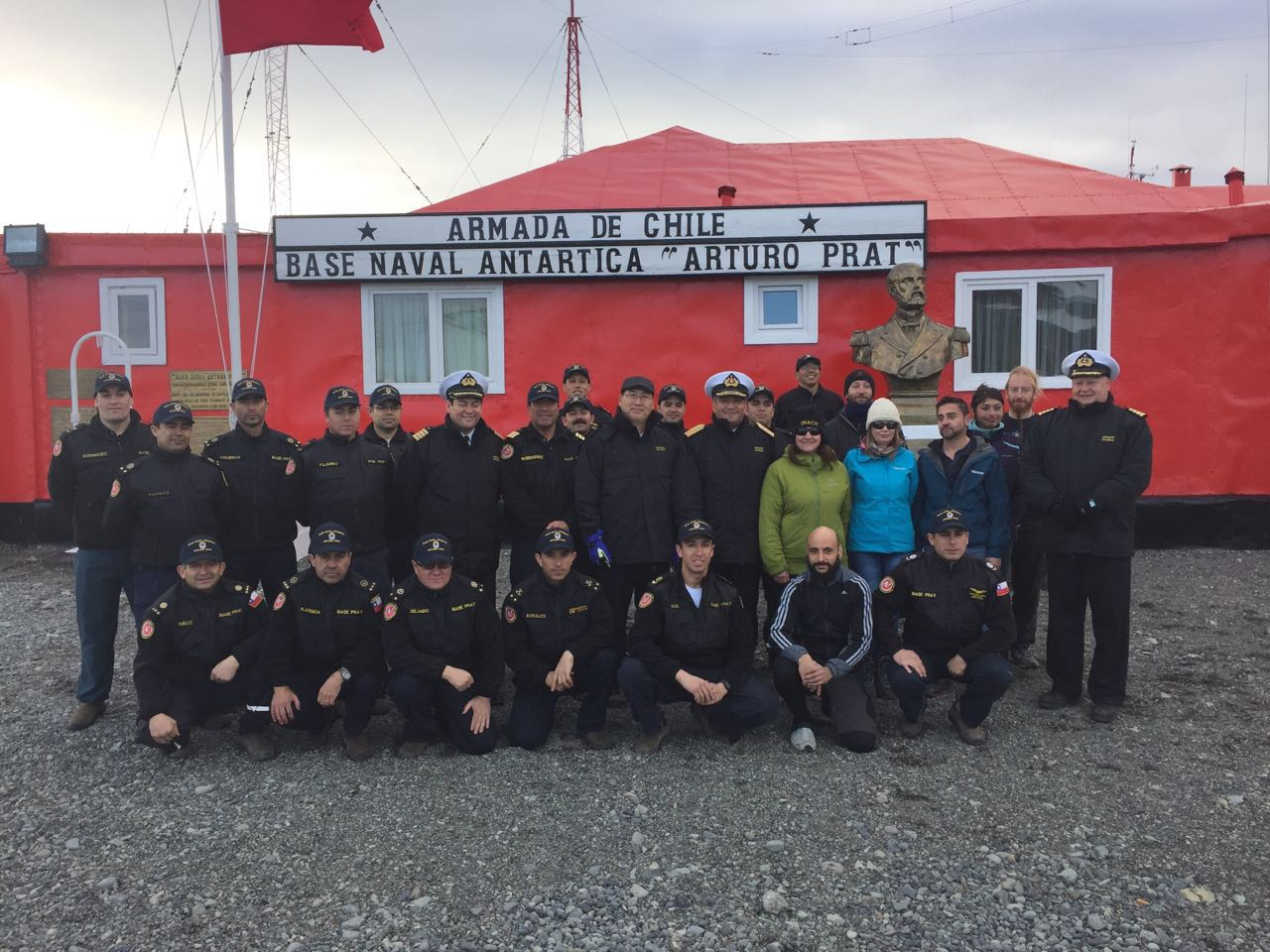
- Base Naval Antártica "Arturo Prat"

- Flag

- Location of Prat Station in Antarctica
- Coordinates: 62°28′44″S 59°39′52″W
- Country: Chile
- Location in Antarctica: Iquique Cove; Greenwich Island; South Shetland Islands
- Administered by: Chilean Navy
- Established: 6 February 1947
- Named after: Arturo Prat
- Elevation: 0 m (0 ft)

Population (2017)
  - Summer: 30
  - Winter: 8
- UN/LOCODE: AQ APT
- Type: All-year round
- Period: Annual
- Status: Operational
- Activities: Ionospheric and meteorologic research
- Website: Base Arturo Prat INACH

Captain Arturo Prat Base (Spanish: Base Naval Antártica "Arturo Prat") is a Chilean Antarctic research station located at Iquique Cove, Greenwich Island in the South Shetland Islands, Antarctica.

Opened February 6, 1947 by the First Chilean Antarctic Expedition, it is the oldest Chilean Antarctic station. Until March 1, 2006, it was a base of the Chilean Navy, on which date it was handed over to the regional government of Magallanes and Antártica Chilena Region. Until February 2004, it had been a permanent base. Afterwards, it had served as a summer base for ionospheric and meteorologic research. There have been plans to reopen the station for permanent occupation starting March 2008. The base is named for Captain Arturo Prat, a Chilean naval officer.

== Historic sites ==
- A concrete monolith was erected in 1947 near the base as a point of reference for Chilean Antarctic hydrographic surveys. It represents an important pre-IGY activity in Antarctica, and is preserved and maintained by personnel from the base. It has been designated a Historic Site or Monument (HSM 32), following a proposal by Chile to the Antarctic Treaty Consultative Meeting.
- A shelter and cross with plaque was erected near the base and named after Lieutenant Commander González Pacheco, who died in 1960 while in charge of the station. It commemorates events related to a person whose role and the circumstances of his death have both symbolic and educational value relating to human activities in Antarctica. It has been designated a Historic Site or Monument (HSM 33), following a proposal by Chile to the Antarctic Treaty Consultative Meeting.
- A bust of Chilean naval hero Arturo Prat was erected at the base in 1947. It represents pre-IGY activities and has symbolic value relating to Chilean presence in Antarctica. It has been designated a Historic Site or Monument (HSM 34), following a proposal by Chile to the Antarctic Treaty Consultative Meeting.
- A wooden cross and statue of the Virgin of Carmel was erected in 1947 near the base. It represents pre-IGY activities and has both symbolic and architectural value. It has been designated a Historic Site or Monument (HSM 35), following a proposal by Chile to the Antarctic Treaty Consultative Meeting.

== Climate ==
The climate is maritime polar (Köppen: ET), being on the coast of the peninsula with less severe averages than expected in Antarctica. Extreme temperatures can reach −29 °C or −20.2 °F in July, which is still quite bearable to humans protected due to considerable moderation of the sea, and a rare heat wave caused the temperature to reach 19 °C or 66.2 °F, a relatively high value. The climate is quite humid for its location and precipitation is fairly well distributed, so that even in the driest months it receives more precipitation than almost all of the Mediterranean zone.

Climate data for Captain Arturo Prat Base, elevation: 5 m or 16 ft, 1991–2020 normals, extremes 1958-present (Note: Although there are several gaps (periods without data) that compromise the historical series. Days of precipitation are only 1983-1990)
Month	Jan	Feb	Mar	Apr	May	Jun	Jul	Aug	Sep	Oct	Nov	Dec	Year
Record high °C (°F)	8.4 (47.1)	13.0 (55.4)	9.1 (48.4)	5.0 (41.0)	5.8 (42.4)	4.2 (39.6)	3.9 (39.0)	3.5 (38.3)	4.9 (40.8)	5.4 (41.7)	6.3 (43.3)	9.7 (49.5)	13.0 (55.4)
Mean daily maximum °C (°F)	3.4 (38.1)	3.4 (38.1)	2.2 (36.0)	0.5 (32.9)	−1.0 (30.2)	−2.9 (26.8)	−3.4 (25.9)	−3.3 (26.1)	−2.1 (28.2)	−0.6 (30.9)	0.8 (33.4)	2.3 (36.1)	−0.1 (31.8)
Daily mean °C (°F)	1.9 (35.4)	1.8 (35.2)	0.7 (33.3)	−1.1 (30.0)	−2.9 (26.8)	−5.2 (22.6)	−6.0 (21.2)	−5.8 (21.6)	−4.6 (23.7)	−2.5 (27.5)	−0.6 (30.9)	0.8 (33.4)	−2.0 (28.4)
Mean daily minimum °C (°F)	0.4 (32.7)	0.3 (32.5)	−0.9 (30.4)	−2.7 (27.1)	−4.7 (23.5)	−7.4 (18.7)	−8.5 (16.7)	−8.3 (17.1)	−7.0 (19.4)	−4.4 (24.1)	−2.2 (28.0)	−0.7 (30.7)	−3.8 (25.2)
Record low °C (°F)	−6.2 (20.8)	−7.2 (19.0)	−15.2 (4.6)	−18.0 (−0.4)	−24.8 (−12.6)	−21.8 (−7.2)	−30.0 (−22.0)	−26.2 (−15.2)	−26.0 (−14.8)	−19.0 (−2.2)	−12.2 (10.0)	−7.0 (19.4)	−30.0 (−22.0)
Average precipitation mm (inches)	75.0 (2.95)	72.7 (2.86)	80.1 (3.15)	72.2 (2.84)	60.8 (2.39)	49.1 (1.93)	43.5 (1.71)	40.8 (1.61)	49.9 (1.96)	61.5 (2.42)	52.6 (2.07)	55.6 (2.19)	708.9 (27.91)
Average precipitation days (≥ 1.0 mm)	10	12	15	10	8	10	7	10	12	12	15	11	132
Average relative humidity (%)	86.8	87.0	88.2	88.2	88.4	88.7	89.1	88.7	88.4	88.0	87.0	85.7	87.7
Source 1: Dirección Meteorológica de Chile
Source 2: DWD (precipitation days 1961–1990)

== Maps ==
Topographic map of Livingston Island, Greenwich, Robert, Snow and Smith Islands.

- L.L. Ivanov et al. Antarctica: Livingston Island and Greenwich Island, South Shetland Islands. Scale 1:100,000 topographic map. Sofia: Antarctic Place-names Commission of Bulgaria, 2005.
- L.L. Ivanov. Antarctica: Livingston Island and Greenwich, Robert, Snow and Smith Islands. Scale 1:120,000 topographic map. Troyan: Manfred Wörner Foundation, 2010. ISBN 978-954-92032-9-5 (First edition 2009. ISBN 978-954-92032-6-4)
- Antarctic Digital Database (ADD). Scale 1:250000 topographic map of Antarctica. Scientific Committee on Antarctic Research (SCAR). Since 1993, regularly upgraded and updated.

== Gallery ==
Location of Greenwich Island in the South Shetland Islands

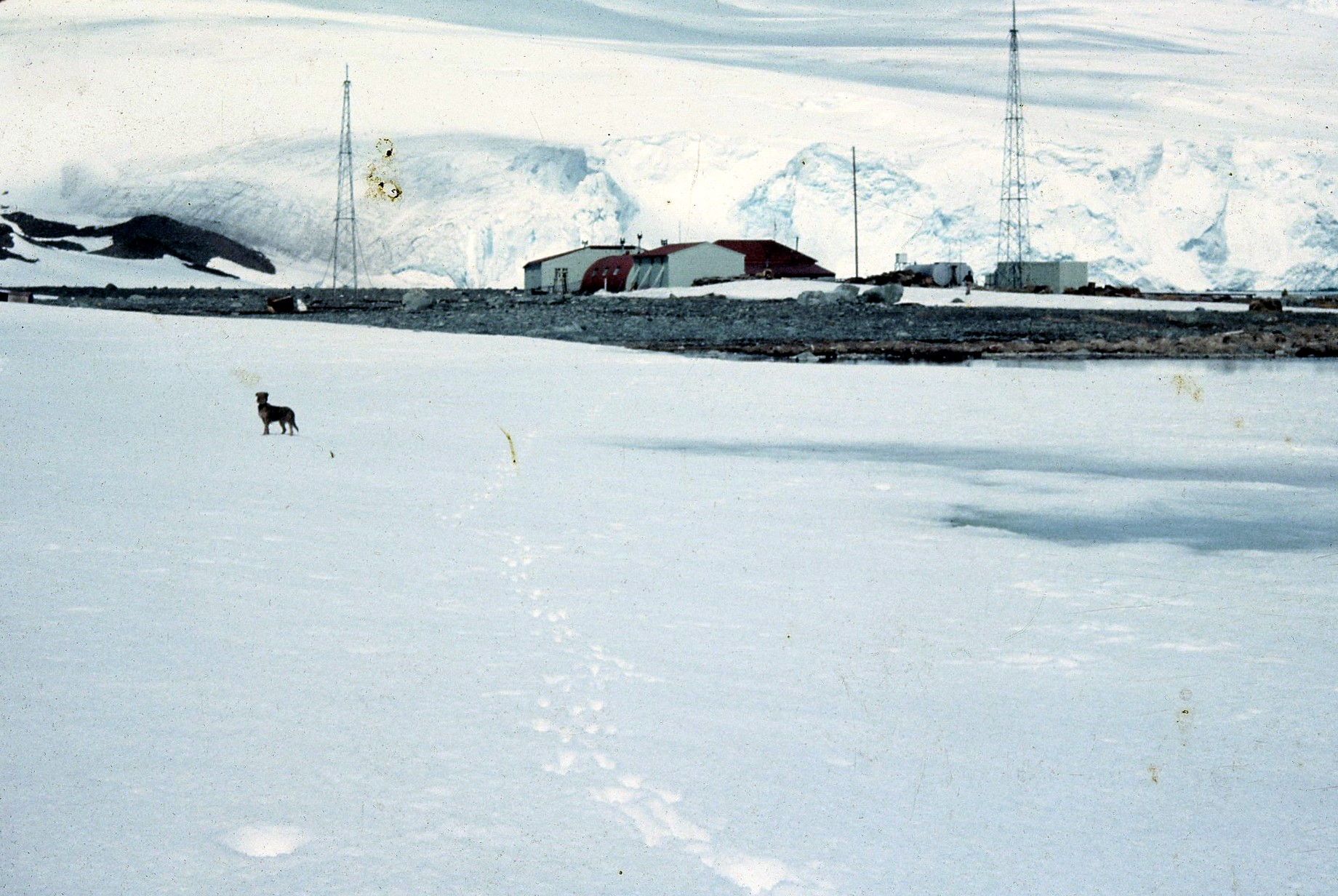
View of base in 1957

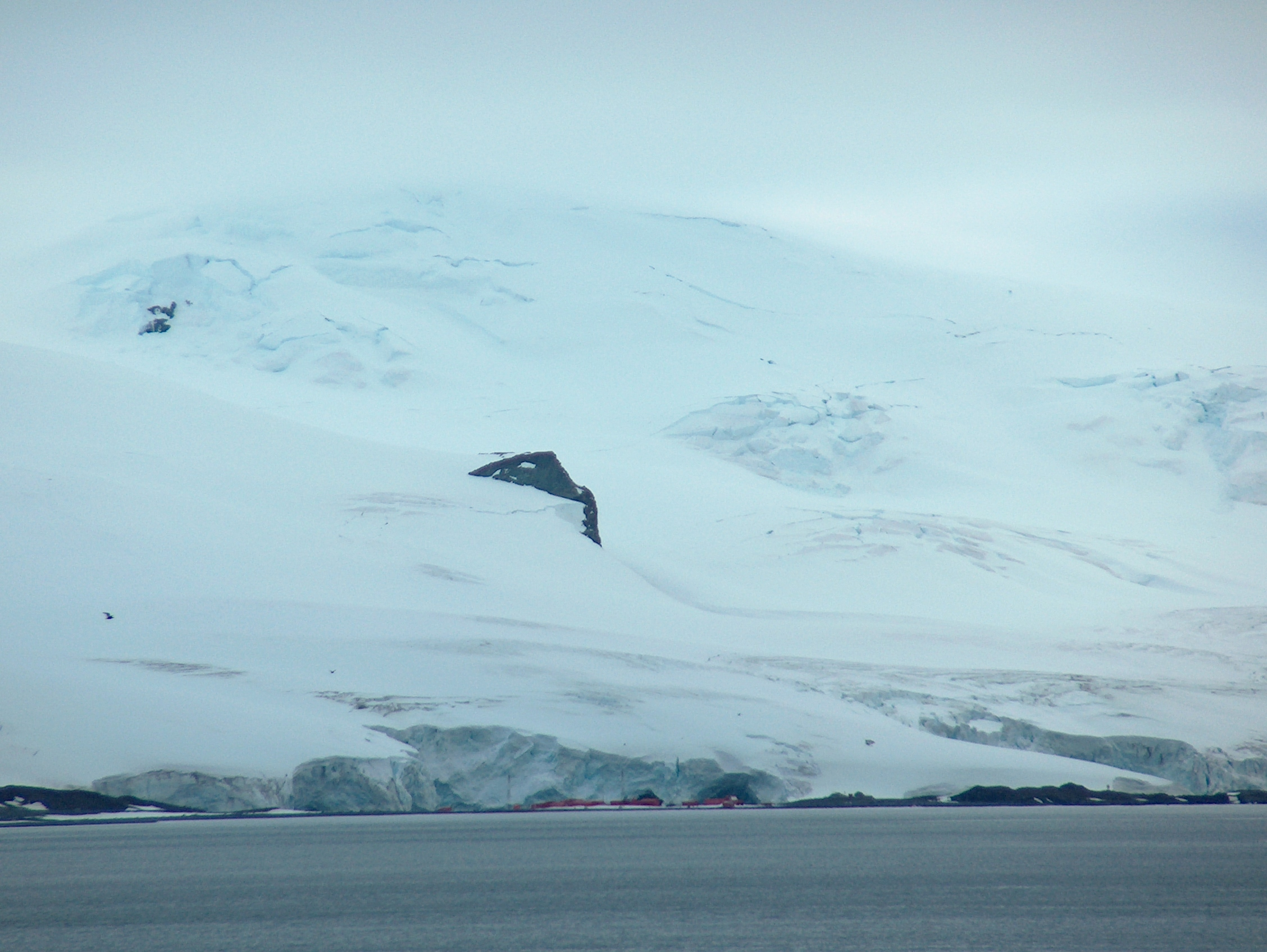
Arturo Prat Base from English Strait, with Rousseau Peak and Fuerza Aérea Glacier in the background

== See also ==
- List of Antarctic research stations
- List of Antarctic field camps
