= Fort Point (Greenwich Island) =

Location of Greenwich Island in the South Shetland Islands.

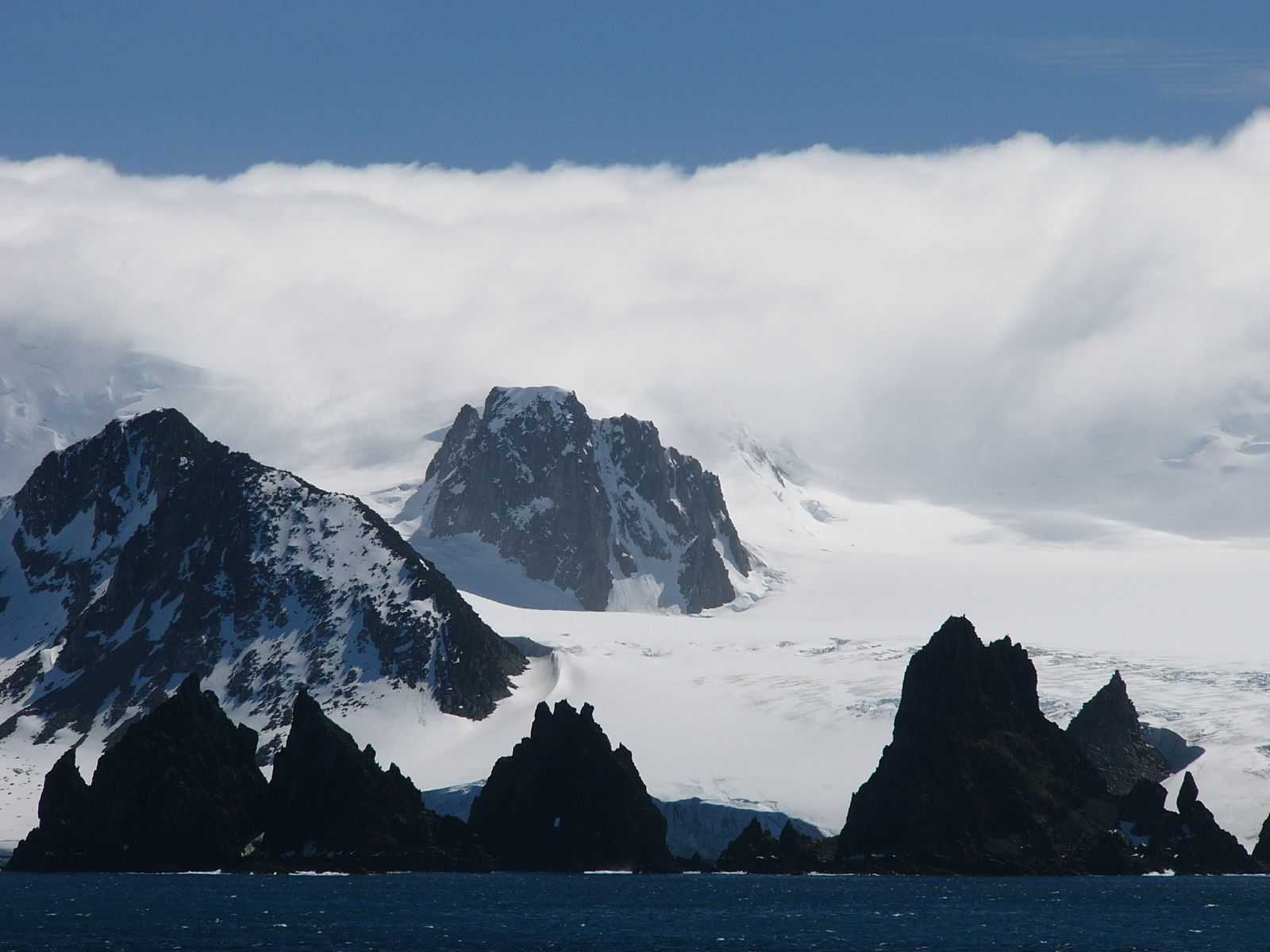
Fort Point from Bransfield Strait, with St. Kiprian Peak and Lyutitsa Nunatak in the background.

Topographic map of Livingston Island, Greenwich, Robert, Snow and Smith Islands.

Fort Point is a conspicuous rocky point rising to 85 m and linked by a low 700 m isthmus to the southeast coast of Greenwich Island in the South Shetland Islands, Antarctica. The feature's name is descriptive, replacing the earlier version 'Castle Rock'.

== Location ==
The point is located at 62°32′35″S 59°34′31″W which is 4.56 km east-northeast of Sartorius Point, 1.62 km east of St. Kiprian Peak and 4.9 km south by west of Santa Cruz Point. British mapping in 1968, Chilean in 1971, Argentine in 1980, and Bulgarian in 2005 and 2009.

== Maps ==
- L.L. Ivanov et al. Antarctica: Livingston Island and Greenwich Island, South Shetland Islands. Scale 1:100000 topographic map. Sofia: Antarctic Place-names Commission of Bulgaria, 2005.
- L.L. Ivanov. Antarctica: Livingston Island and Greenwich, Robert, Snow and Smith Islands. Scale 1:120000 topographic map. Troyan: Manfred Wörner Foundation, 2009. ISBN 978-954-92032-6-4
