= Ash Point =

Ice-free point in the South Shetland Islands, Antarctica

- Location of Ash Point

- Location within Antarctic Peninsula Location within Antarctica

Geography
- Location: Antarctica
- Coordinates: 62°28′05″S 59°39′19″W
- Archipelago: South Shetland Islands
- Area: 201 ha (500 acres)

Administration
- Antarctica
- Administered under the Antarctic Treaty System

Demographics
- Population: uninhabited

Ash Point is a rounded low ice-free point forming the southeast side of the entrance to Discovery Bay in the northeast of Greenwich Island in the South Shetland Islands, Antarctica with an adjacent ice-free area of 201 hectares (500 acres). Letelier Bank (62°28′01.1″S 59°39′28.8″W) is lying off Ash Point, while Bascopé Point (62°28′15.3″S 59°39′42″W) is situated 460 m (503 yd)to the southwest, with the 1 km (0.62 mi) wide Rojas Cove (62°28′31″S 59°39′48″W) indenting for 310 m (339 yd) the coast between that point and Guesalaga Peninsula. The area was visited by early 19th century sealers.

Ash Point was charted and named descriptively by the Discovery Investigations in 1935. Bascopé Point and Rojas Cove were named by the 1947 Chilean Antarctic Expedition respectively for First Lieutenant Juan Bascopé, meteorologist of the expedition, and for Captain Gabriel Rojas, Commander of the expedition transport ship Angamos, and Letelier Bank was probably named after a member of the expedition.

== Location ==
The point is located at 62°28′05″S 59°39′19″W which is 6.35 km (3.95 mi) northwest of Santa Cruz Point, 4.57 km (2.84 mi) southeast of Spark Point, 5 km (3.11 mi) southwest of Beron Point, Robert Island and 8.07 km (5.01 mi) west of Edwards Point, Robert Island. British mapping in 1935 and 1968, Chilean in 1951, Argentine in 1953, and Bulgarian in 2005 and 2009.

Topographic map of Livingston Island, Greenwich, Robert, Snow and Smith Islands.

== See also ==
- Composite Antarctic Gazetteer
- List of Antarctic islands south of 60° S
- SCAR
- Territorial claims in Antarctica

== Map ==
- L.L. Ivanov et al. Antarctica: Livingston Island and Greenwich Island, South Shetland Islands. Scale 1:100000 topographic map. Sofia: Antarctic Place-names Commission of Bulgaria, 2005.
