= Spark Point =

Heographic feature in Antarctica

- Location of Greenwich Island in the South Shetland Islands

Geography
- Location: Antarctica
- Coordinates: 62°26′36.7″S 59°43′35″W
- Area: 164 ha (410 acres)

Administration
- Antarctica
- Administered under the Antarctic Treaty System

Demographics
- Population: 0

Topographic map of Livingston Island, Greenwich, Robert, Snow and Smith Islands.

Spark Point, also Canto Point, is a rocky point forming the northwest side of the entrance to both Discovery Bay and Galápagos Cove, and the east side of the entrance to Jambelí Cove in the northeast of Greenwich Island in the South Shetland Islands, Antarctica. The point ends up in a conspicuous monolithic formation and has an adjacent ice-free area of 164 hectares (410 acres). The area was visited by early 19th century sealers.

The feature is named after the American sealing schooner Spark which operated out of the nearby Clothier Harbour in 1820–21.

== Location ==
The point is located at 62°26′36.7″S 59°43′35″W which is 4.57 km (2.84 mi) northwest of Ash Point, 3.02 km (1.88 mi) southeast of Dee Island, 4 km (2.49 mi) south-southeast of Barrientos Island, 8.06 km (5.01 mi) south of Fort William Point, Robert Island and 6.43 km (4.00 mi) southwest of Negra Point, Robert Island. British mapping in 1935 and 1968, Argentine in 1949, Chilean in 1965, and Bulgarian in 2005 and 2009.

== See also ==
- Composite Antarctic Gazetteer
- List of Antarctic and sub-Antarctic islands
- List of Antarctic islands south of 60° S
- SCAR
- Territorial claims in Antarctica

== Map ==
- L.L. Ivanov et al. Antarctica: Livingston Island and Greenwich Island, South Shetland Islands. Scale 1:100000 topographic map. Sofia: Antarctic Place-names Commission of Bulgaria, 2005.
