= Discovery Bay (Antarctica) =

Bay in the Antarctic

Coordinates: 62°29′S 59°43′W

Location of Discovery Bay in Antarctica

Location of Greenwich Island in the South Shetland Islands

Topographic map of Livingston Island, Greenwich, Robert, Snow and Smith Islands.

Discovery Bay is a bay 5 km (3 mi) long and 3 km (2 mi) wide, indenting the north side of Greenwich Island, in the South Shetland Islands of Antarctica. It had been known to sealers in the area since about 1821. It was charted and named in 1935 by Discovery Investigations personnel on the Discovery II.

The Chilean Antarctic Expedition of 1947, under the command of Captain Federico Guesalaga Toro, decided to rename the name Bahía Chile as the site of Chile's first permanent Antarctic base, Base Soberanía, now Capitán Arturo Prat Base.

== Antarctic Specially Protected Area ==
Two marine sites in the bay have collectively been designated Antarctic Specially Protected Area (ASPA) 144 (formerly SSSI 26), to protect the bay's benthic communities, which have relatively high species diversity and biomass and have been subject to a long-term research program.

== Maps ==
- L.L. Ivanov. Antarctica: Livingston Island and Greenwich, Robert, Snow and Smith Islands. Scale 1:120000 topographic map. Troyan: Manfred Wörner Foundation, 2009. ISBN 978-954-92032-6-4
