= Murgash Glacier =

Glacier in Antarctica

- Location of Greenwich Island in the South Shetland Islands

- Location within South Shetland Islands Location within Antarctica
- Location: Greenwich Island; South Shetland Islands
- Coordinates: 62°29′50″S 59°52′10″W
- Length: 1.8 nmi (3 km; 2 mi)
- Width: 1.7 nmi (3 km; 2 mi)
- Thickness: unknown
- Terminus: Kramolin Cove
- Status: unknown

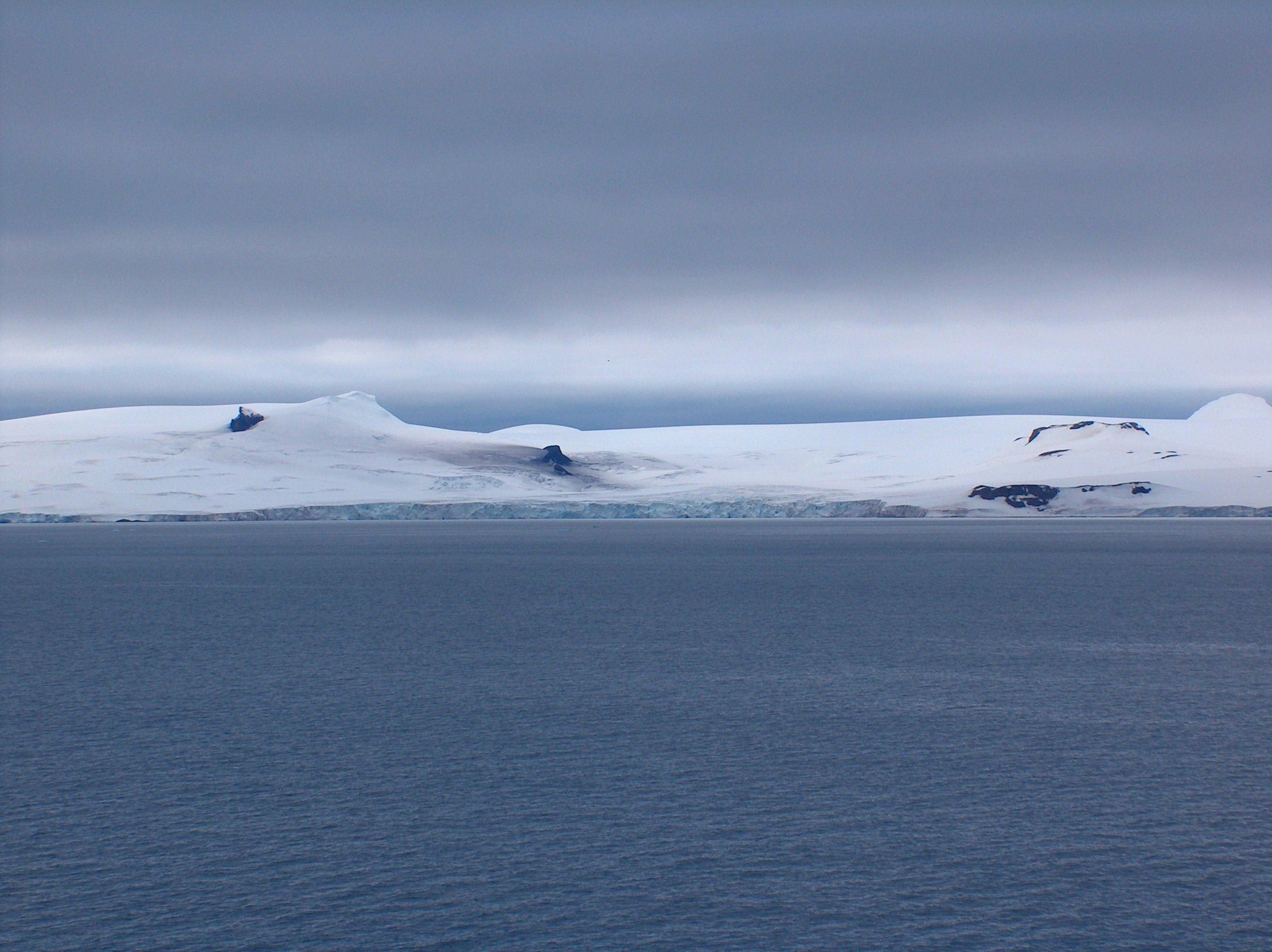
Murgash Glacier

Topographic map of Livingston Island and Smith Island

Murgash Glacier (Bulgarian: ледник Мургаш, romanized: lednik Murgash, IPA: [ˈlɛdnik morˈɡaʃ])is the 3.4 km long and 3.2 km wide glacier on Greenwich Island in the South Shetland Islands, Antarctica situated southeast of Yakoruda Glacier, south of Teteven Glacier, southwest of Traub Glacier and west-northwest of Bravo Glacier. It is bounded by Lloyd Hill on the northwest, Tile Ridge on the east and Hebrizelm Hill on the southeast, and drains southwards into Kramolin Cove in McFarlane Strait between Yovkov Point and Kaspichan Point.

The glacier is named after Murgash in the western Balkan Mountains, Bulgaria.

== Location ==
Murgash Glacier is centred at 62°29′50″S 59°52′10″W. Bulgarian mapping in 2005 and 2009.

== See also ==
- List of glaciers in the Antarctic
- Glaciology

== Maps ==
- L.L. Ivanov et al. Antarctica: Livingston Island and Greenwich Island, South Shetland Islands. Scale 1:100000 topographic map. Sofia: Antarctic Place-names Commission of Bulgaria, 2005.
- L.L. Ivanov. Antarctica: Livingston Island and Greenwich, Robert, Snow and Smith Islands. Scale 1:120000 topographic map. Troyan: Manfred Wörner Foundation, 2009. ISBN 978-954-92032-6-4
- Antarctic Digital Database (ADD). Scale 1:250000 topographic map of Antarctica. Scientific Committee on Antarctic Research (SCAR). Since 1993, regularly upgraded and updated.
- L.L. Ivanov. Antarctica: Livingston Island and Smith Island. Scale 1:100000 topographic map. Manfred Wörner Foundation, 2017. ISBN 978-619-90008-3-0
