= Kramolín =

Kramolín or Kramolin may refer to:

== Places ==
=== Antarctica ===
- Kramolin Cove, a cove

=== Bulgaria ===
- Kramolin, Bulgaria, a village in the Gabrovo Province

=== Czech Republic ===
- Kramolín (Plzeň-South District), a municipality and village in the Plzeň Region
- Kramolín (Třebíč District), a municipality and village in the Vysočina Region
- Kramolín, a village and part of Jílovice (České Budějovice District) in the South Bohemian Region
- Kramolín, a village and part of Křešín (Pelhřimov District) in the Vysočina Region

== People ==
- Josef Kramolín, Czech painter
