= Mohelnice (disambiguation) =

Mohelnice is a town in the Olomouc Region, Czech Republic.

Mohelnice may also refer to places in the Czech Republic:

- Mohelnice (Plzeň-South District), a municipality and village in the Plzeň Region
- Mohelnice, a village and part of Křešín in the Vysočina Region
- Mohelnice nad Jizerou, a municipality and village in the Central Bohemian Region
