= Ciroadas =

3rd century BC king of the Odrysian kingdom of Thrace

Ciroadas (Ancient Greek: Κιροάδας) was a king of the Odrysian kingdom of Thrace who may have reigned in the years 212 to 200 BC. According to an anonymous poem in the Greek Anthology, he was defeated by king Philip V of Macedon, who dedicated his booty to the goddess Hecate. This may have happened in the year 205 or 200 BC, as the most probable dates, or in another year of Philip's reign. Ciroadas, who gains the epithet the Bold from the poet, is depicted as an important king of the Odrysians. He may have been the victor in the war against Cavarus, in 212 BC, and the destroyer of the Celtic kingdom of Tylis. According to the dedication, he had several sons, but nothing more is known of his family.

== See also ==
- List of Thracian tribes
