= Kladara Beach =

Beach in Antarctica

Location of Greenwich Island in the South Shetland Islands

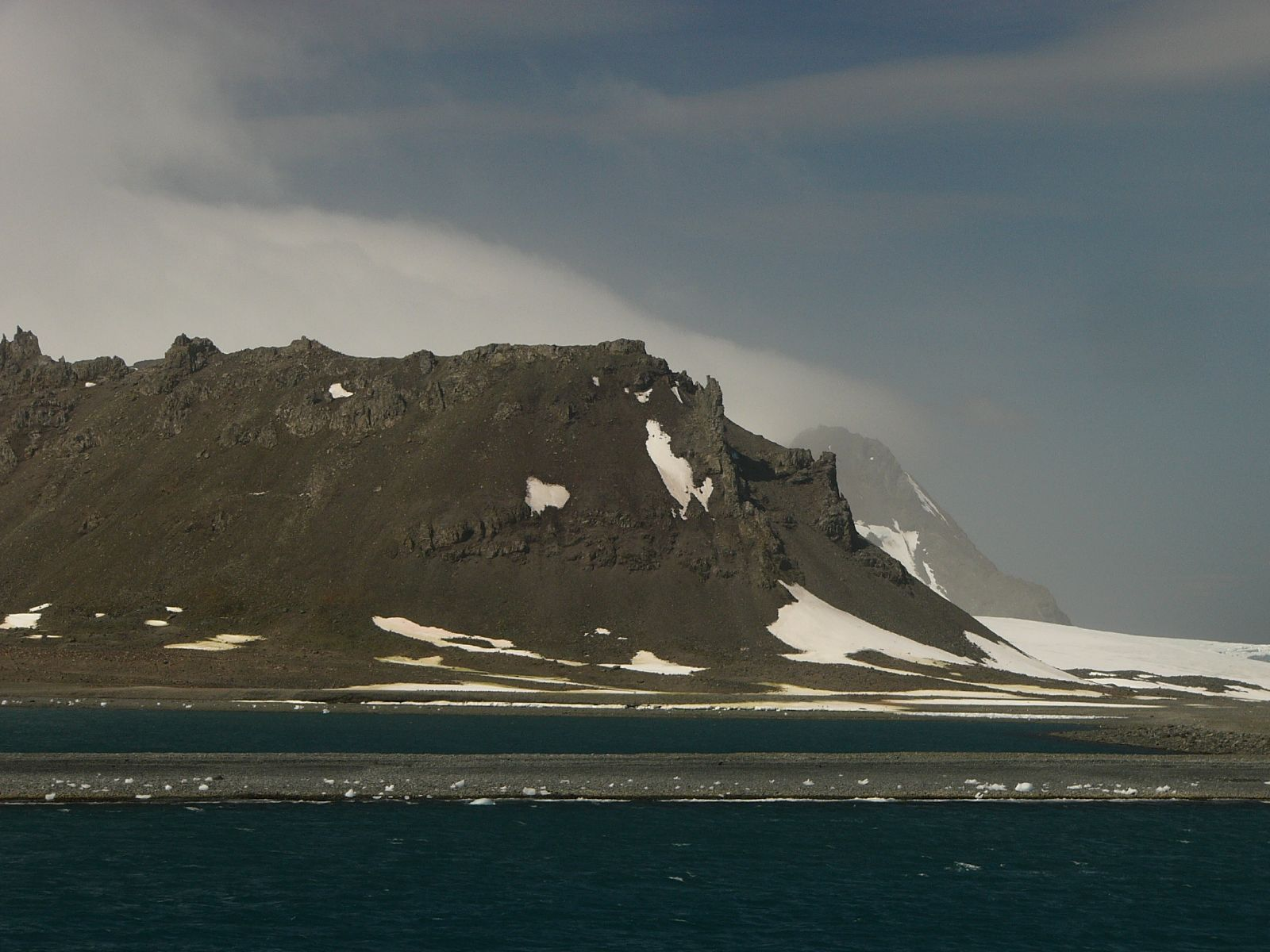
The southern part of Kladara Beach from Shopski Cove, with Provadiya Hook in the foreground

Topographic map of Livingston Island and Smith Island

Kladara Beach (Bulgarian: бряг Кладара, romanized: bryag Kladara, IPA: [ˈbrʲak kɫɐˈdarɐ]) is the 2 km beach forming the south side of Yankee Harbour on the southwest coast of Greenwich Island in the South Shetland Islands, Antarctica. Bounded by the base of Provadiya Hook to the west, Oborishte Ridge to the south, and the terminus of Solis Glacier to the east. It is snow-free in summer.

The beach is named after the ancient and medieval fortress of Kladara in Southeastern Bulgaria.

== Location ==
Kladara Beach is located at 62°31′45″S 59°45′45″W. British mapping in 1822 and 1968, Chilean in 1971, Argentine in 1980, and Bulgarian in 2005 and 2009.

== Maps ==
- L.L. Ivanov et al. Antarctica: Livingston Island and Greenwich Island, South Shetland Islands. Scale 1:100000 topographic map. Sofia: Antarctic Place-names Commission of Bulgaria, 2005.
- L.L. Ivanov. Antarctica: Livingston Island and Greenwich, Robert, Snow and Smith Islands. Scale 1:120000 topographic map. Troyan: Manfred Wörner Foundation, 2009. ISBN 978-954-92032-6-4 (Updated second edition 2010. ISBN 978-954-92032-9-5)
