= Comontorius =

Celtic king in Thrace

Comontorius was a Celtic king in Thrace who in 278 BC founded the kingdom of Tylis, imposing a tribute on the city of Byzantium. His successor on the throne was Cavarus under whom Tylis was destroyed by the Thracians in 212 BC.
