= Bravo Glacier =

Glacier in Antarctica

- Location of Greenwich Island in the South Shetland Islands

- Location within South Shetland Islands Location within Antarctica
- Location: Greenwich Island; South Shetland Islands
- Coordinates: 62°30′20″S 59°49′20″W
- Length: 1 nmi (2 km; 1 mi)
- Width: 1 nmi (2 km; 1 mi)
- Thickness: unknown
- Terminus: Shopski Cove
- Status: unknown

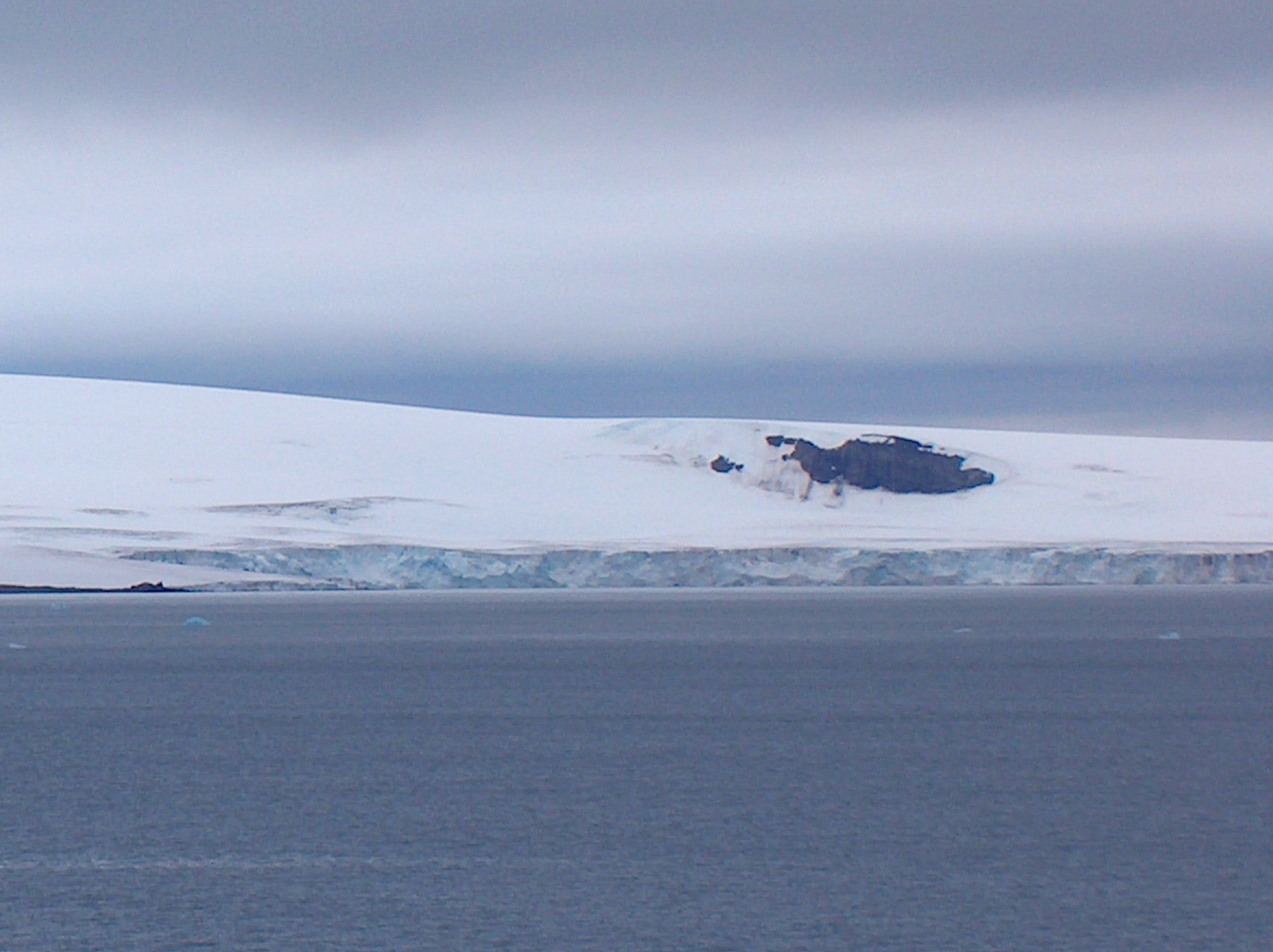
Bravo Glacier from Half Moon Island, with Malamir Knoll in the background.

Topographic map of Livingston Island and Smith Island

Bravo Glacier is a glacier on Greenwich Island in the South Shetland Islands, Antarctica extending 2.1 km in northwest-southeast direction and 2.3 km in southwest-northeast direction and draining the south slopes of Dryanovo Heights to flow southeastwards into Shopski Cove.

The feature was probably named after an officer in the Chilean ship Lientur that took part in the 1952-53 Chilean survey of Yankee Harbour.

== Location ==
The glacier is centred at 62°30′20″S 59°49′20″W (Bulgarian mapping in 2005 and 2009).

== See also ==
- List of glaciers in the Antarctic
- Glaciology

== Maps ==
- L.L. Ivanov et al. Antarctica: Livingston Island and Greenwich Island, South Shetland Islands. Scale 1:100000 topographic map. Sofia: Antarctic Place-names Commission of Bulgaria, 2005.
- L.L. Ivanov. Antarctica: Livingston Island and Greenwich, Robert, Snow and Smith Islands. Scale 1:120000 topographic map. Troyan: Manfred Wörner Foundation, 2009. ISBN 978-954-92032-6-4
