= Hebrizelm Hill =

Location of Greenwich Island in the South Shetland Islands.

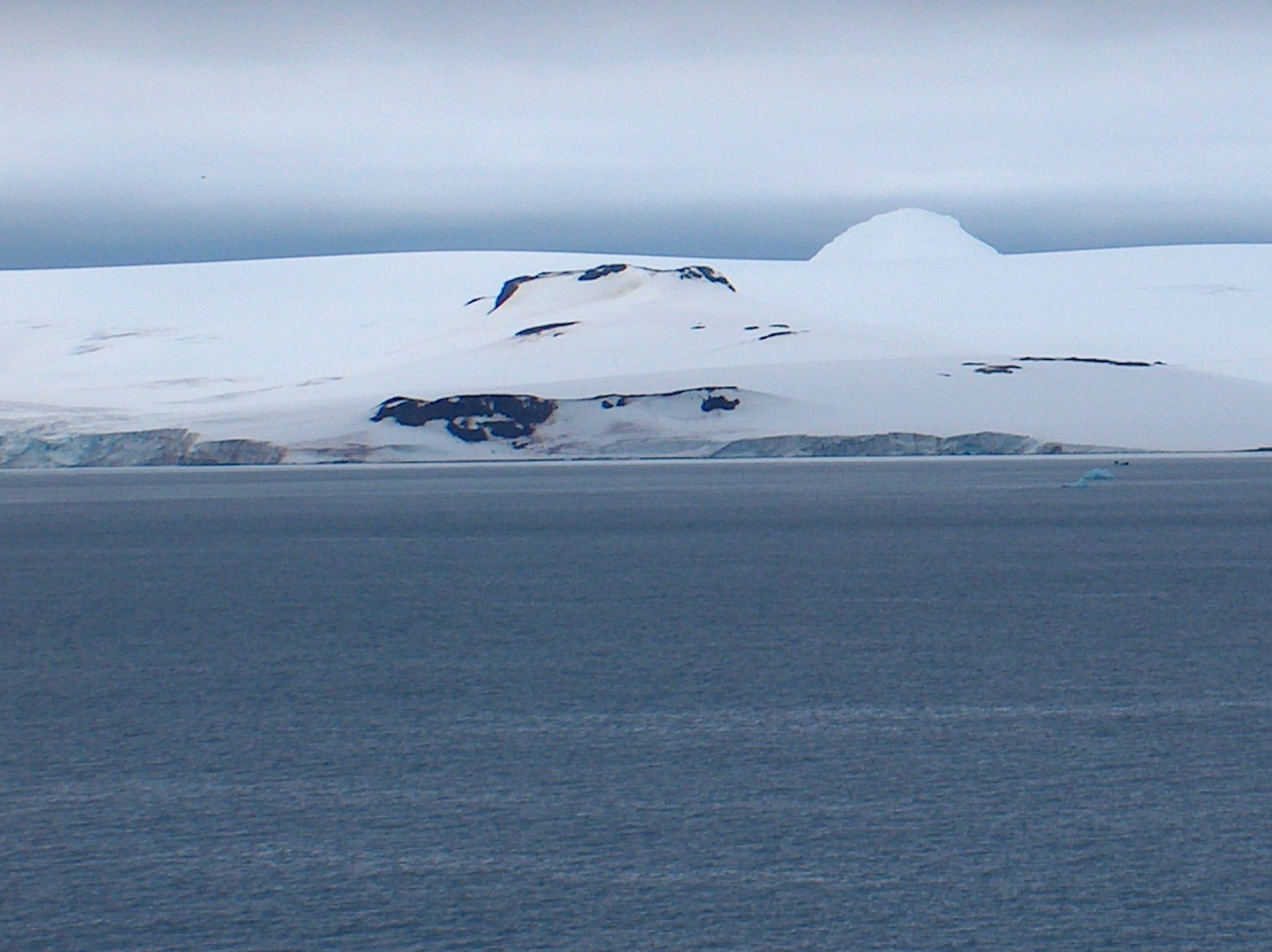
Hebrizelm Hill, with Tile Ridge and Mt. Plymouth in the background.

Topographic map of Livingston Island, Greenwich, Robert, Snow and Smith Islands.

Hebrizelm Hill (Halm Hebrizelm \'h&lm he-bri-'zelm\) is a rocky hill rising to 70 m on the south-west coast of Greenwich Island, South Shetland Islands. An offshoot of the hill is forming Kaspichan Point. The hill is named after the Thracian King Hebryzelmis, 389–384 BC.

== Location ==
The hill is located at 62°30′58.2″S 59°51′40″W which is 1.1 km northwest of Triangle Point, and 1.95 km south-southwest of Tile Ridge (Bulgarian topographic survey Tangra 2004/05).

== Maps ==
- L.L. Ivanov et al. Antarctica: Livingston Island and Greenwich Island, South Shetland Islands. Scale 1:100000 topographic map. Sofia: Antarctic Place-names Commission of Bulgaria, 2005.
- L.L. Ivanov. Antarctica: Livingston Island and Greenwich, Robert, Snow and Smith Islands. Scale 1:120000 topographic map. Troyan: Manfred Wörner Foundation, 2009. ISBN 978-954-92032-6-4
