= Yovkov Point =

Point on Greenwich Island, Antarctica

Location of Greenwich Island in the South Shetland Islands.

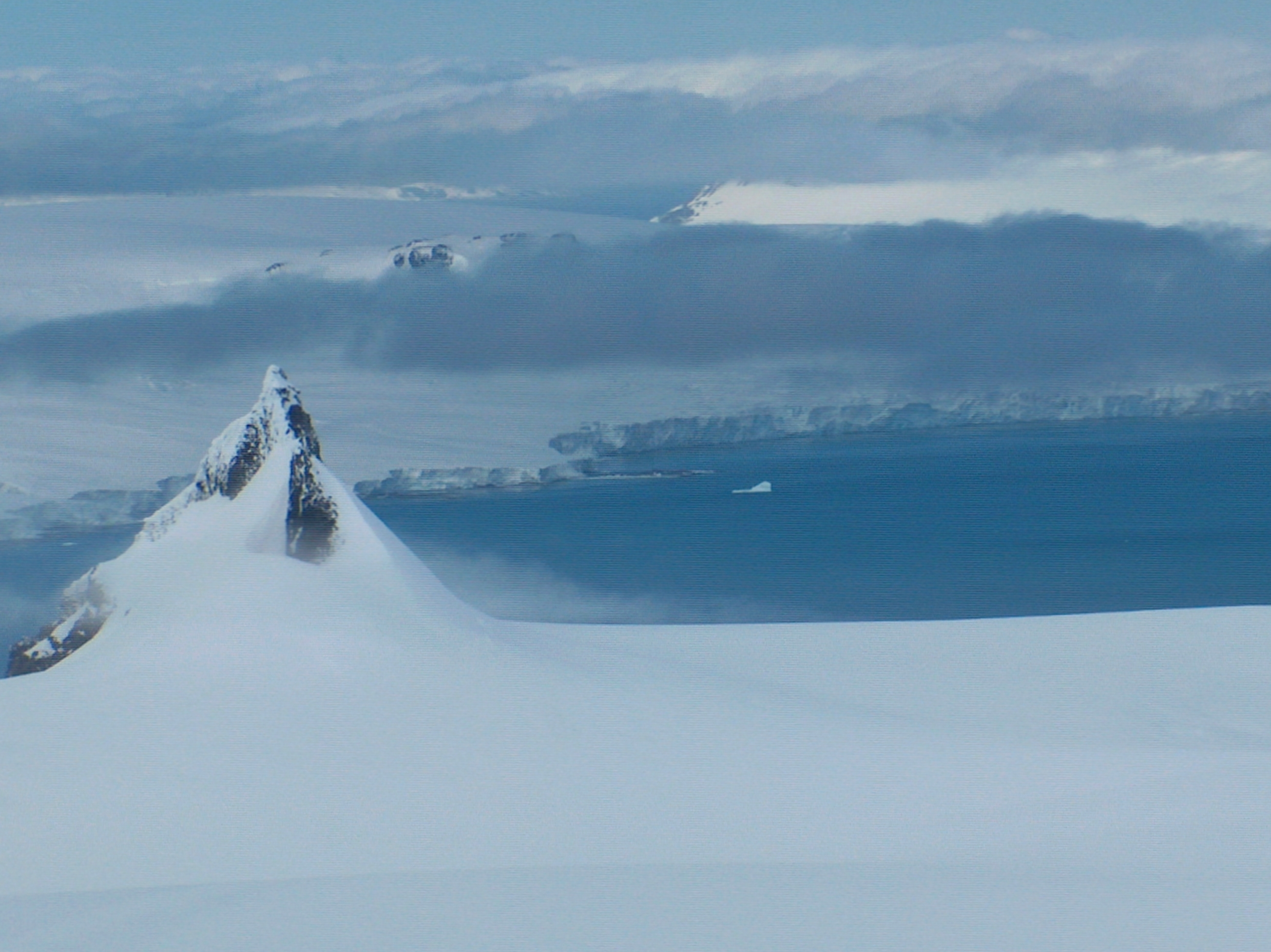
Yovkov Point (on the opposite coast of McFarlane Strait) from Miziya Peak, with Sharp Peak on the left.

Topographic map of Livingston Island, Greenwich, Robert, Snow and Smith Islands.

Yovkov Point (Yovkov Nos \'yov-kov 'nos\) is a point on the southwest coast of Greenwich Island, Antarctica projecting 150 m southwards into McFarlane Strait, forming the northwest side of the entrance to Kramolin Cove. Formed as a result of Murgash Glacier's retreat in the late 20th and early 21st century. The feature is named after the famous Bulgarian writer Yordan Yovkov (1880–1937).

== Location ==
The point is located at 62°30′30.3″S 59°54′11″W, which is 3.6 km southeast of Kerseblept Nunatak, 2.2 km south-southwest of Lloyd Hill, 2.95 km southwest of Tile Ridge and 1.98 km west-northwest of Kaspichan Point (Bulgarian topographic survey Tangra 2004/05 and mapping in 2005 and 2009).

== Maps ==
- L.L. Ivanov et al. Antarctica: Livingston Island and Greenwich Island, South Shetland Islands. Scale 1:100000 topographic map. Sofia: Antarctic Place-names Commission of Bulgaria, 2005.
- L.L. Ivanov. Antarctica: Livingston Island and Greenwich, Robert, Snow and Smith Islands. Scale 1:120000 topographic map. Troyan: Manfred Wörner Foundation, 2009. ISBN 978-954-92032-6-4
