= Spit Point (Greenwich Island) =

Location of Greenwich Island in the South Shetland Islands.

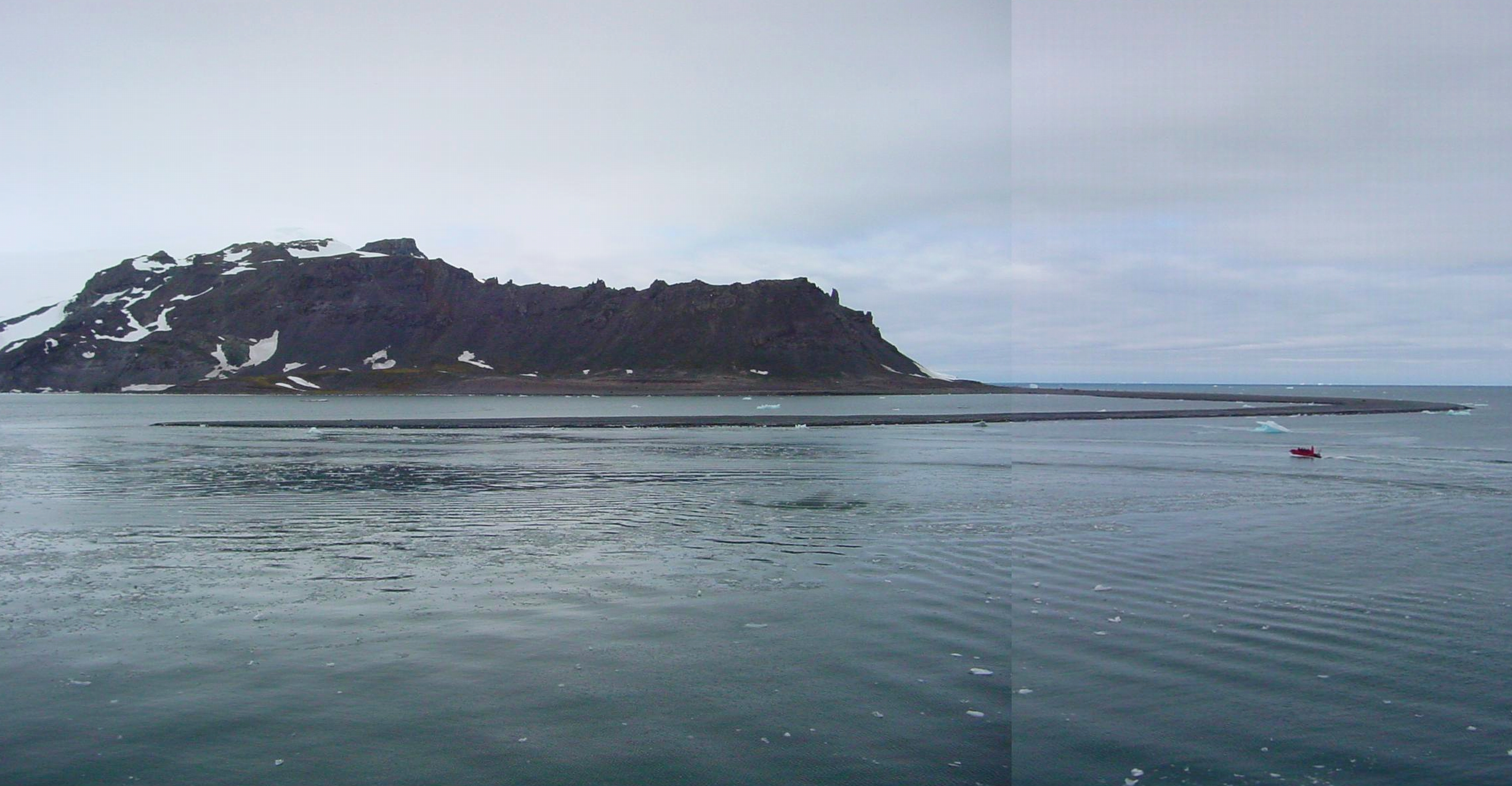
Provadiya Hook from Shopski Cove, with Spit Point at its left extremity and Oborishte Ridge in the background.

Topographic map of Livingston Island, Greenwich, Robert, Snow and Smith Islands.

Spit Point (62°31′32″S 59°47′18.5″W) is a narrow gravel spit forming the south side of the entrance to Yankee Harbor, Greenwich Island, in the South Shetland Islands, situated at the end of Provadiya Hook. The point was known to early sealers in the area and roughly charted on Powell's map of 1822. It was recharted by DI personnel on the Discovery II in 1935 and given this descriptive name.

== Maps ==
- L.L. Ivanov et al. Antarctica: Livingston Island and Greenwich Island, South Shetland Islands. Scale 1:100000 topographic map. Sofia: Antarctic Place-names Commission of Bulgaria, 2005.
- L.L. Ivanov. Antarctica: Livingston Island and Greenwich, Robert, Snow and Smith Islands. Scale 1:120000 topographic map. Troyan: Manfred Wörner Foundation, 2009. ISBN 978-954-92032-6-4
