= Malamir =

Malamir may refer to:

- Malamir of Bulgaria, a Bulgarian ruler (Khan)
- Malamir, Iran, a city in Khuzestan Province, Iran
- Malamir Knoll, a knoll in Dryanovo Heights, Greenwich Island
