= Provadia Municipality =

Provadia Municipality Община Провадия
- Municipality
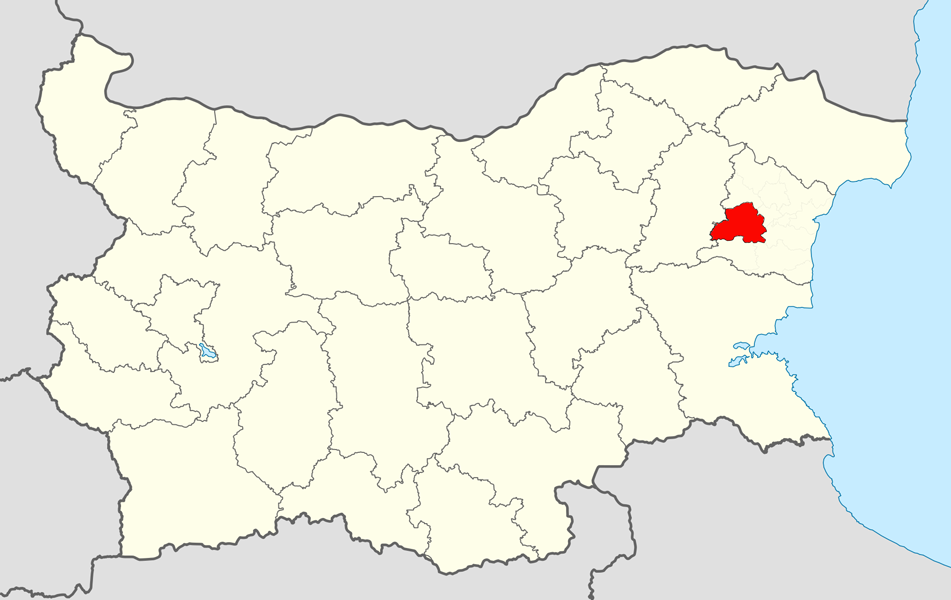
- Provadia Municipality within Bulgaria and Varna Province.
- Coordinates: 43°10′N 27°24′E
- Country: Bulgaria
- Province (Oblast): Varna
- Admin. centre (Obshtinski tsentar): Provadia

Area
  - Total: 576.6 km^{2} (222.6 sq mi)

Population (December 2009)
  - Total: 23,045
  - Density: 39.97/km^{2} (103.5/sq mi)
- Time zone: UTC+2 (EET)
  - Summer (DST): UTC+3 (EEST)

Provadia Municipality (Bulgarian: Община Провадия) is a municipality (obshtina) in Varna Province, Northeastern Bulgaria. It is named after its administrative centre - the town of Provadia.

The municipality embraces a territory of 576.6 km^{2} (222.6 sq mi) with a population, as of December 2009, of 23,045 inhabitants.

== Settlements ==
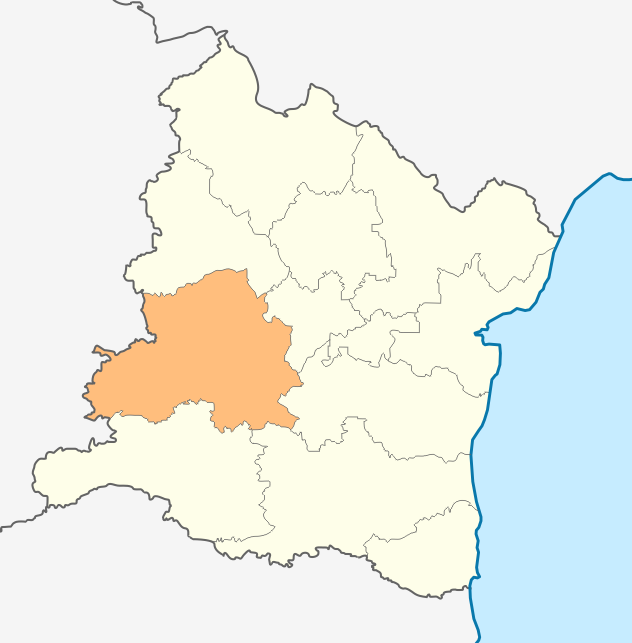
Provadiya Municipality within Varna Province

Provadia Municipality includes the following 25 places (towns are shown in bold):

Town/Village	Cyrillic	Population (December 2009)
**Provadia**	**Провадия**	12,901
Blaskovo	Блъсково	1,354
Bozveliysko	Бозвелийско	1,296
Barzitsa	Бързица	270
Chayka	Чайка	94
Cherkovna	Черковна	240
Chernook	Черноок	247
Dobrina	Добрина	256
Gradinarovo	Градинарово	801
Hrabrovo	Храброво	439
Kiten	Китен	52
Komarevo	Комарево	463
Krivnya	Кривня	400
Manastir	Манастир	563
Nenovo	Неново	69
Ovchaga	Овчага	184
Petrov Dol	Петров дол	344
Ravna	Равна	179
Slaveykovo	Славейково	476
Snezhina	Снежина	570
Staroselets	Староселец	62
Tutrakantsi	Тутраканци	249
Venchan	Венчан	338
Tziganitza	Циганица	950
Zlatina	Златина	248
Total		23,045

== Demography ==
The following table shows the change of the population during the last four decades.

Provadia Municipality
Year	1975	1985	1992	2001	2005	2007	2009	2011
Population	31,461	28,893	28,414	25,718	24,573	23,747	23,045	...
Sources: Census 2001, Census 2011, „pop-stat.mashke.org“,

=== Religion ===
According to the latest Bulgarian census of 2011, the religious composition, among those who answered the optional question on religious identification, was the following:

Religious composition of Provadia Municipality
Orthodox Christianity	61.6%
Catholicism	0.4%
Protestantism	0.8%
Islam	10.5%
No religion	10.2%
Prefer not to answer, others and indefinable	16.5%

A majority of the population of Provadia Municipality identify themselves as Christians. At the 2011 census, 61.6% of respondents identified as Orthodox Christians belonging to the Bulgarian Orthodox Church.

== See also ==
- Provinces of Bulgaria
- Municipalities of Bulgaria
- List of cities and towns in Bulgaria
