= Glacier Bluff =

Glacier Bluff (62°32′S 59°48′W) is an ice cliff 30 metres (100 ft) high, forming the north side of the entrance to Yankee Harbour, Greenwich Island, in the South Shetland Islands, Antarctica. It was charted and named in 1935 by Discovery Investigations personnel on the Discovery II.
