= Triangle Point =

Geographic point in Antarctica

Location of Greenwich Island in the South Shetland Islands

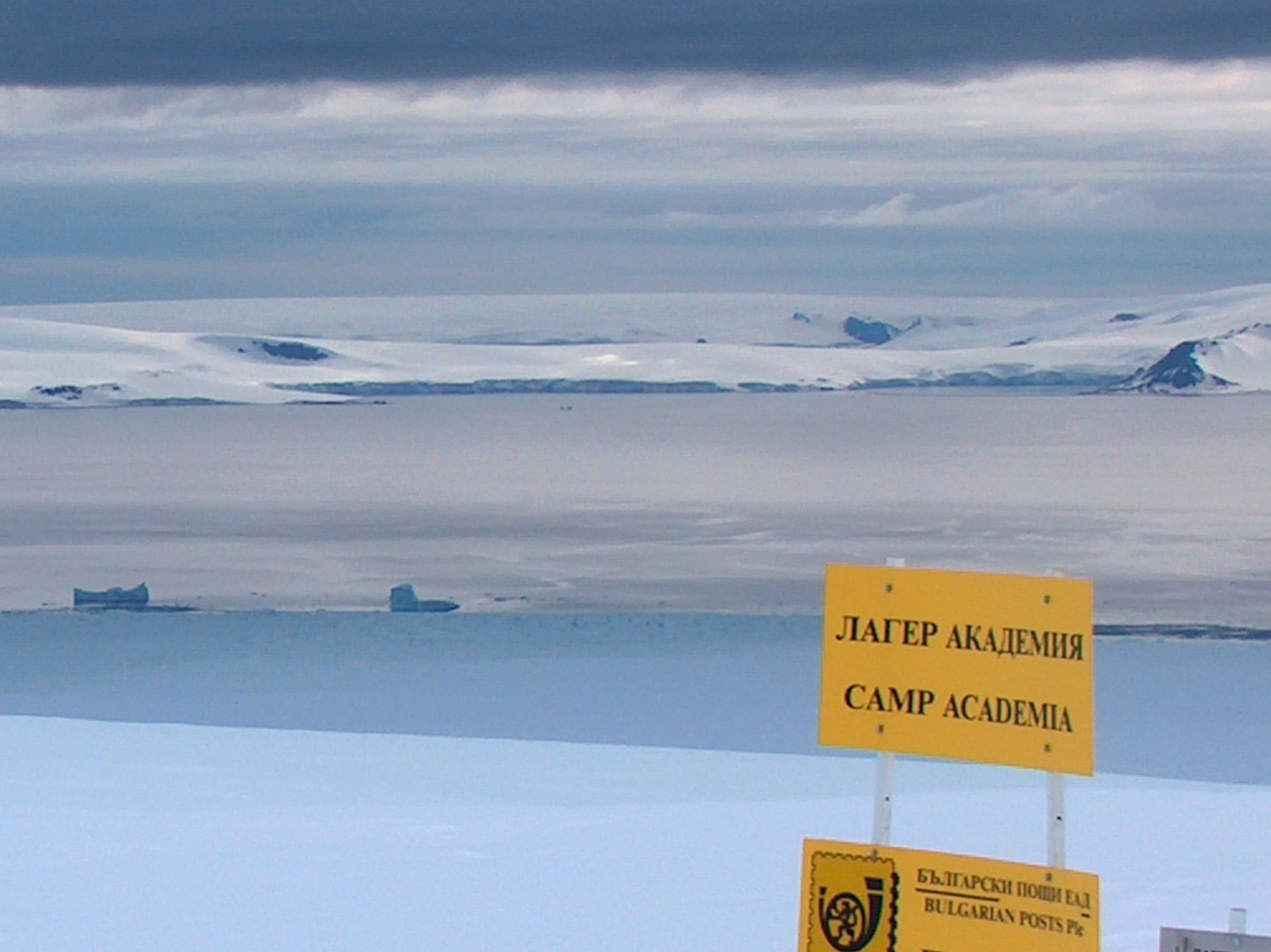
Triangle Point (on the left) from Camp Academia, with McFarlane Strait in the foreground

Topographic map of Livingston Island and Smith Island

Triangle Point is the low ice-free tipped point forming the northwest side of the entrance to Shopski Cove in the south coast of Parvomay Neck linking the northwest and southeast parts of Greenwich Island in the South Shetland Islands, Antarctica. The area was frequented by early 19th century sealers operating from Yankee Harbour.

The feature was charted and descriptively named by the Discovery Investigations in 1935.

== Location ==
The point is located at 62°31′19″S 59°50′39″W which is 2.9 km west by north of Spit Point (the north extremity of Provadiya Hook and an entrance point to Yankee Harbour), 7.44 km northwest of Ephraim Bluff, 7.32 km north-northeast of Half Moon Island, 8.27 km east of Inott Point, Livingston Island and 1.4 km southeast of Kaspichan Point. British mapping in 1935 and 1968, Argentine in 1948, Chilean in 1974, and Bulgarian in 2005 and 2009.

== Maps ==
- South Shetland Islands. Scale 1:200000 topographic map. DOS 610 Sheet W 62 58. Tolworth, UK, 1968.
- L.L. Ivanov et al. Antarctica: Livingston Island and Greenwich Island, South Shetland Islands. Scale 1:100000 topographic map. Sofia: Antarctic Place-names Commission of Bulgaria, 2005.
- L.L. Ivanov. Antarctica: Livingston Island and Greenwich, Robert, Snow and Smith Islands. Scale 1:120000 topographic map. Troyan: Manfred Wörner Foundation, 2009. ISBN 978-954-92032-6-4
- Antarctic Digital Database (ADD). Scale 1:250000 topographic map of Antarctica. Scientific Committee on Antarctic Research (SCAR). Since 1993, regularly updated.
- L.L. Ivanov. Antarctica: Livingston Island and Smith Island. Scale 1:100000 topographic map. Manfred Wörner Foundation, 2017. ISBN 978-619-90008-3-0
