= Provadia =

Provadia Провадия
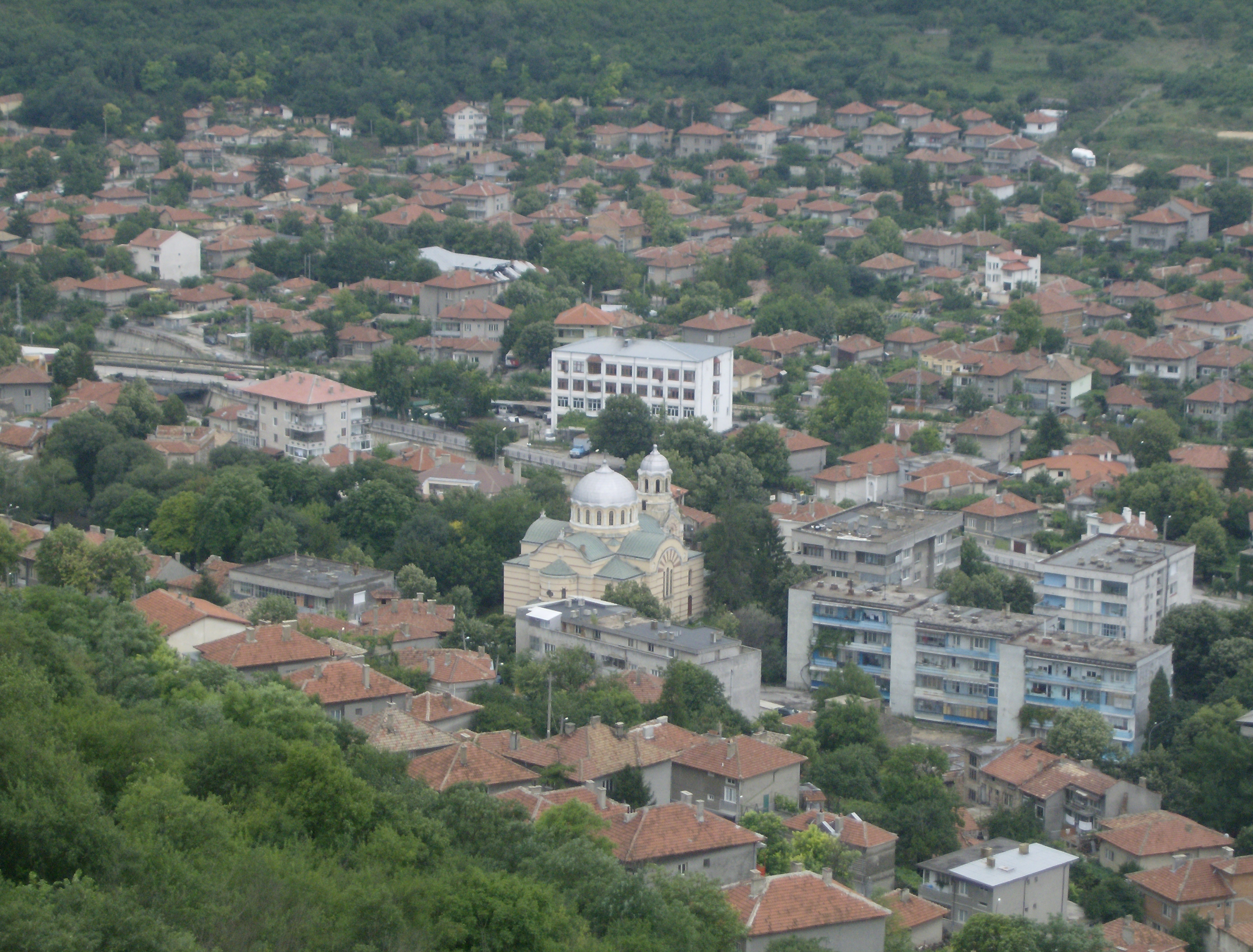
- Aerial view of Provadia

- Location of Provadia
- Coordinates: 43°11′N 27°26′E
- Country: Bulgaria
- Province (Oblast): Varna

Government
  - Mayor: Dimo Dimov
- Elevation: 56 m (184 ft)

Population (2021-12-02)
  - Total: 9,113
- Time zone: UTC+2 (EET)
  - Summer (DST): UTC+3 (EEST)
- Postal Code: 9200
- Area code: 0518
- License plate: B

Provadia (Bulgarian: Провадия [proˈvadijɐ]) is a town in northeastern Bulgaria, part of Varna Province, located in a deep karst gorge (Provadia syncline) along the Provadiya River not far from the Bulgarian Black Sea Coast. It is the administrative centre of Provadia Municipality. As of December 2009, the town had a population of 12,901.

Provadia served as a customs point since ancient times. It is well known for salty mineral waters, its mild climate and a total of 70 km of caves in the surrounding mountain walls. It can be reached by train from Sofia or Varna and there are also hourly buses from and to Varna, and a sophisticated road system.

== History ==
Provadia is the site of Solnitsata, Europe's oldest prehistoric town. Excavations on city walls that started in 2005 reveal a town that dates back to between 4,700 BC and 4,200 BC. It is believed to have been the site of salt trading.

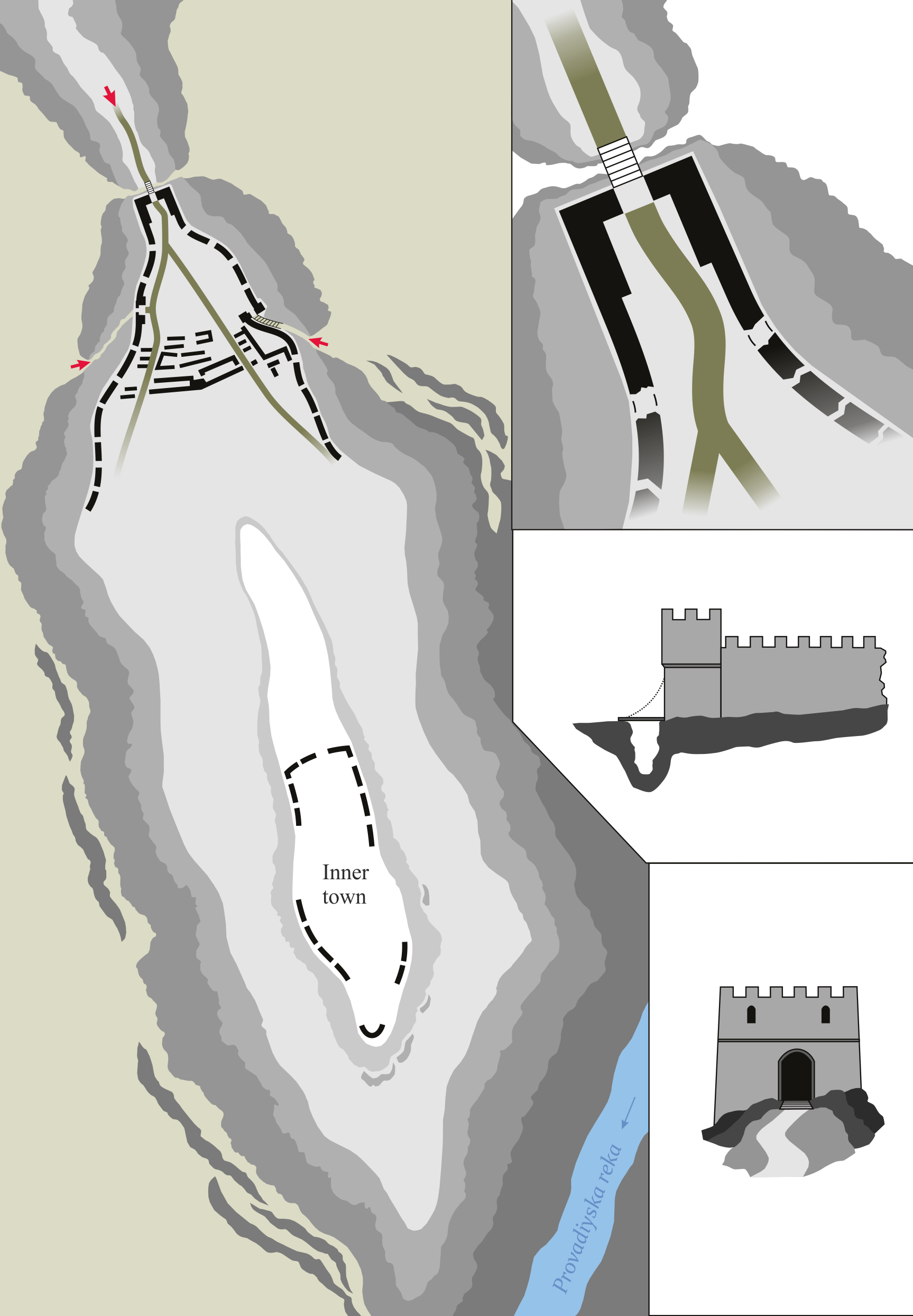
Plan of the fortress Ovech

Historical names of the medieval fortress, the ruins of which have been preserved until today, include Provat (Byzantine Greek), Ovech (Овеч, Bulgarian), Provanto (Italian) and Pravadı (Turkish language). The Greek name and its adaptations stem from the word πρόβατο, provato, "sheep", and the medieval Bulgarian name corresponds directly (being derived from овца, ovtsa, with the same meaning). The fortress is open for visitors.

During the Middle Ages the town was a key centre of the First Bulgarian Empire with an important monastery at the modern village of Ravna, the church of which was consecrated on 23 April 897, and a major scriptorium of the Preslav Literary School. The rebel leader and subsequently emperor of Bulgaria Ivailo defeated a 10,000-strong Byzantine army near the city in 1279. During the Second Bulgarian Empire it was the seat of a metropolitan in the 14th century. Ovech was captured by the Ottomans in 1388 after a long siege.

In the 17th and 18th century Provadia was a commercial centre of the Ottoman Empire and was inhabited by many Jewish and Ragusan merchants. A 16th-17th-century Dubrovnik-style church still stands in the nearby village of Dobrina.

== Today ==
South of Provadia lies the largest rock salt mine in Bulgaria, which is believed to be virtually inexhaustible with a salt dome up to 3900 m high, and has been sporadically exploited for some 7500 years but industrially, through leaching, only since the 1960s; now it is part of Solvay Sodi AD in Devnya under the name Provadsol AD. Some of the leaching caverns are used for the storage of natural gas. Provadia is an important hub on both the Druzhba Gas Pipeline and as of 2015 abandoned South Stream. Other industrial facilities include a modern biodiesel installation, a sunflower oil mill, a heavy earth-mover repair plant, shipbuilding machinery and textile factories. The town has a certain potential as a spa centre; its saline mineral water is allegedly similar in composition to the one at Karlovy Vary.

Places of interest include the Lambova Kashta ethnographical complex and ethnographical collections in Dobrina and Manastir villages, as well as cave monasteries and the ruins of the 9-10th-century Ravna Monastery, one of the most important centres of the Preslav Literary School, dubbed "language laboratory" by Umberto Eco for its graffiti by common folks in several languages and alphabets.

Provadiya Hook in Greenwich Island, South Shetland Islands, Antarctica is named for Provadia.

The current mayor of the town is Dimo Dimov, elected in .

== Municipality ==
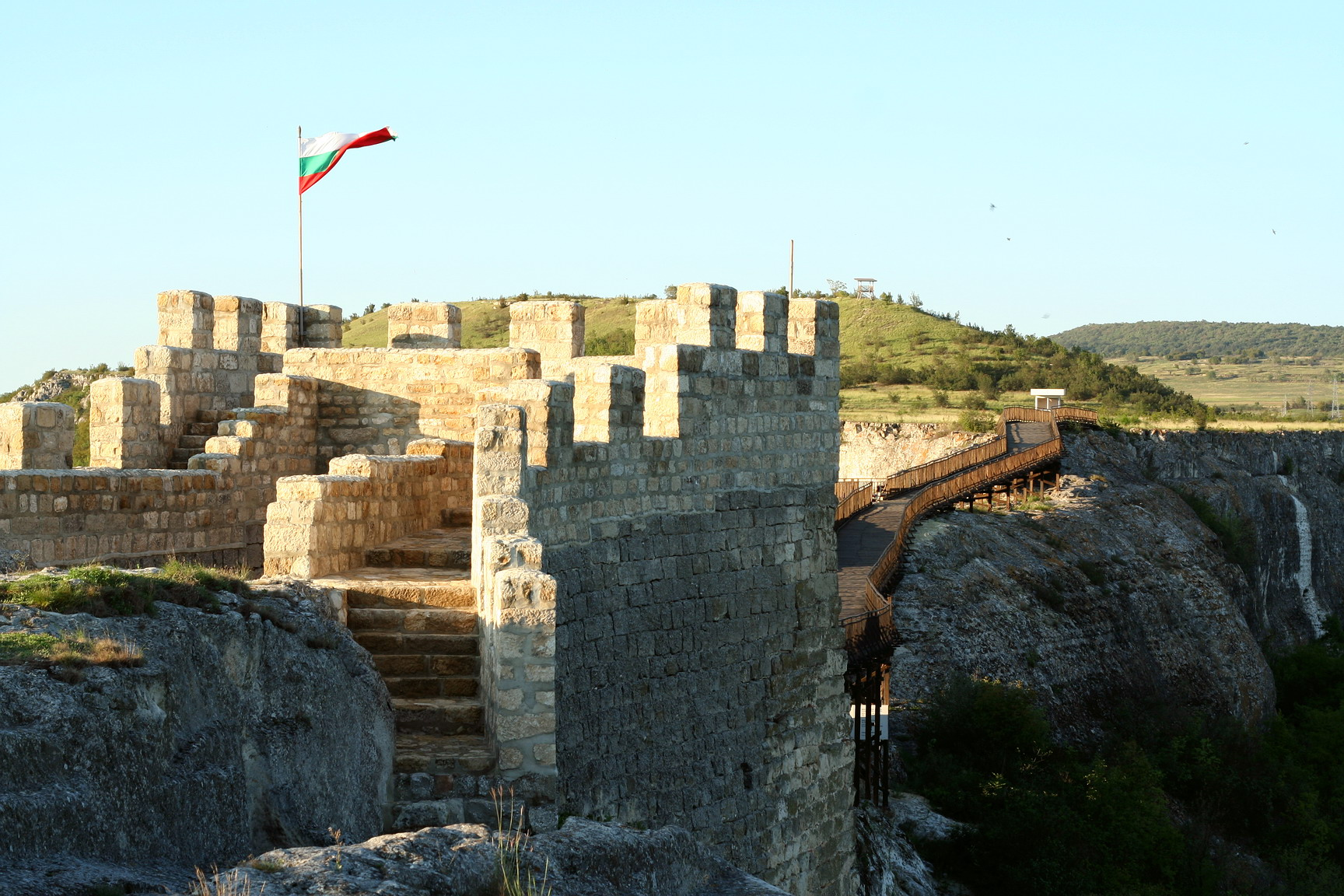
The Ovech Castle above Provadia

Provadia is the seat of Provadia municipality (part of Varna Province), which also includes the following 24 villages:

- Barzitsa
- Blaskovo
- Bozveliysko
- Chayka
- Cherkovna
- Chernook
- Dobrina
- Gradinarovo
- Hrabrovo
- Kiten
- Komarevo
- Krivnya
- Manastir
- Nenovo
- Ovchaga
- Petrov dol
- Ravna
- Slaveykovo
- Snezhina
- Staroselets
- Tutrakantsi
- Venchan
- Zhitnitsa
- Zlatina
