= Venchan =

Venchan Венчан
- Village
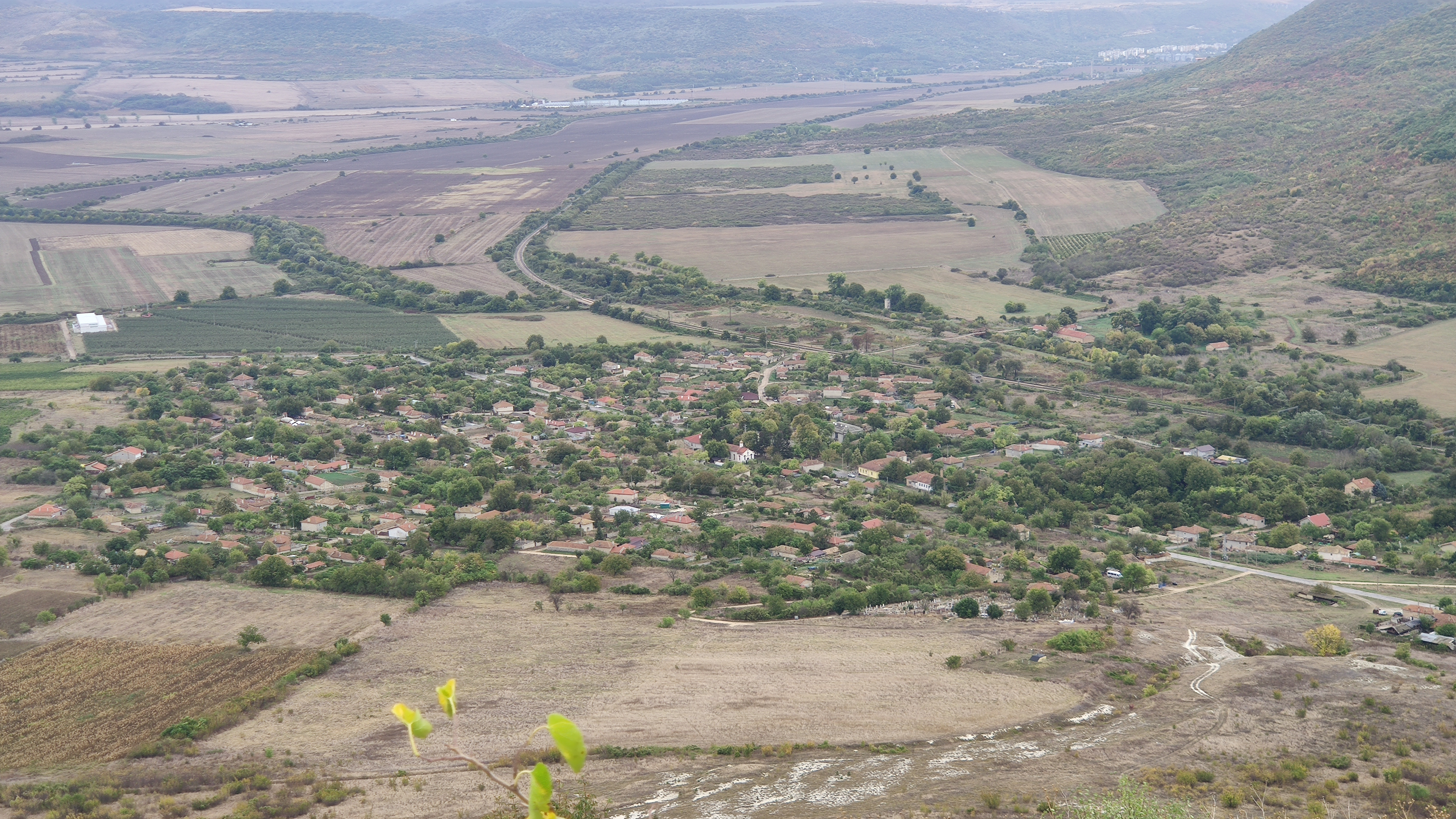

- Location of Venchan
- Coordinates: 43°14′08″N 27°23′22″E leader_name=Vesko Georgiev
- Country: Bulgaria
- Provinces (Oblast): Varna Province

Area
  - Total: 16.596 km^{2} (6.408 sq mi)
- Elevation: 47 m (154 ft)

Population (2007-01-01)
  - Total: 364
  - Density: 21.9/km^{2} (56.8/sq mi)
- Time zone: UTC+2 (EET)
  - Summer (DST): UTC+3 (EEST)
- Postal Code: 9219

Venchan (Bulgarian: Венчан) is a village in the Provadiya Municipality, Varna Province, north-eastern Bulgaria. It is situated at 7 km to the north-west of Provadiya. As of 2007 the village has 364 inhabitants.

Venchan is among the oldest settlements in the surrounding area. There are remains of a Thracian necropolis dated to the 7th-6th centuries BC. The ruins of an antique and medieval fortress. In 1388 the fortress was seized after a fierce resistance by a 30,000-strong Ottoman during a major campaign against the Bulgarian Empire and the settlement was occupied by the Ottomans. The construction of the railway between Ruse and Varna in 1866 which passed through the village and brought some economic prosperity.

== Honours ==
Venchan Peak on Brabant Island, Antarctica is named after the village.
