= Parvomay Neck =

Location of Greenwich Island in the South Shetland Islands

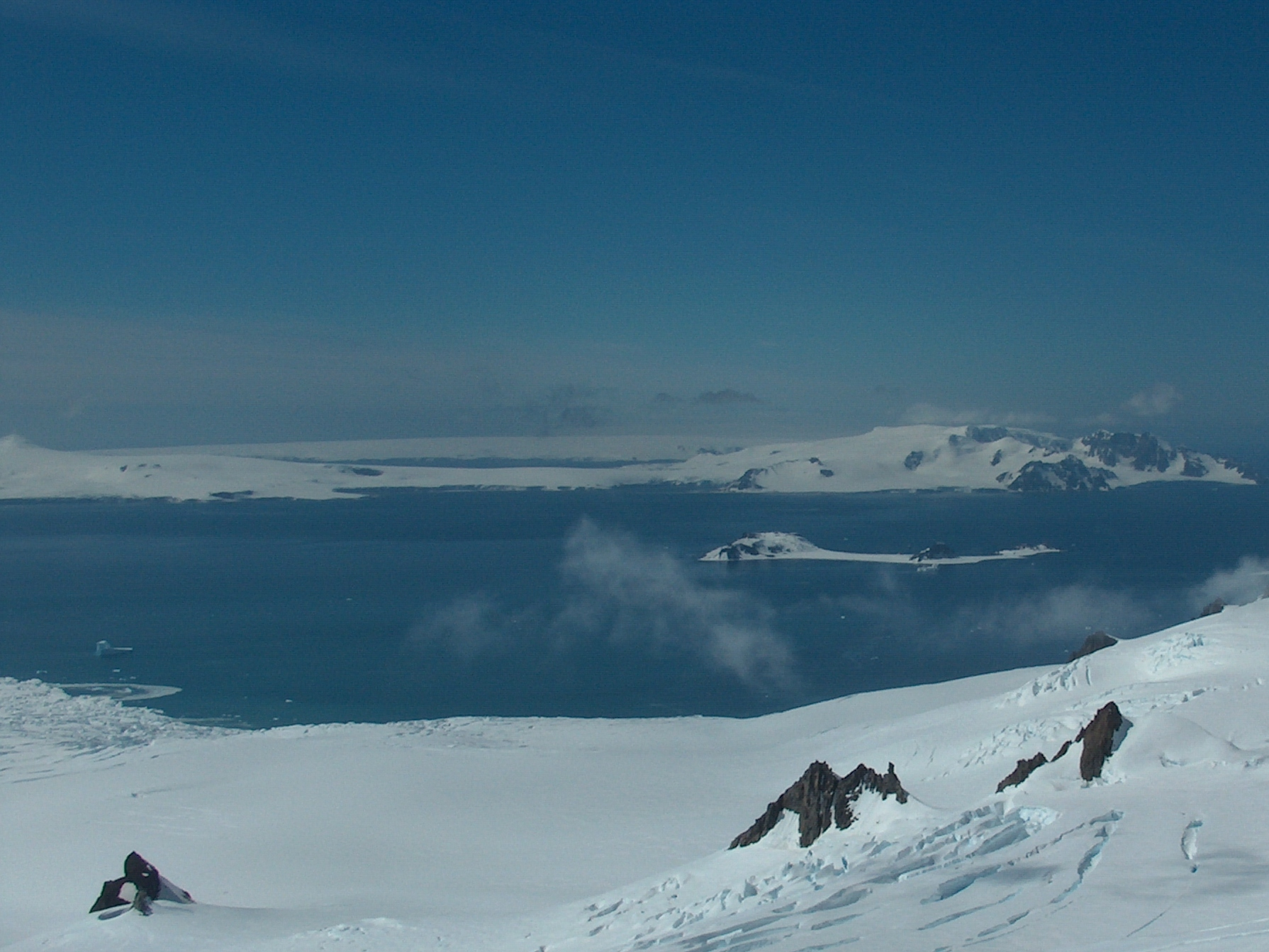
Parvomay Neck from Livingston Island, with McFarlane Strait and Half Moon Island in the foreground and Robert Island in the background

Topographic map of Livingston Island, Greenwich, Robert, Snow and Smith Islands

Parvomay Neck (Bulgarian: Първомайски провлак, ‘Parvomayski Provlak’ \p&r-vo-'may-ski 'pro-vlak\) is the 5 km long and 1.55 to 3.5 km wide ice-covered neck between Discovery Bay to the northeast and Shopski Cove and Yankee Harbour to the southwest, linking the northwestern and southeastern parts of Greenwich Island in the South Shetland Islands, Antarctica.

The feature is named after the town of Parvomay in southern Bulgaria.

== Location ==
Parvomay Neck is located at 62°30′30″S 59°45′30″W. Bulgarian mapping in 2009.

== Map ==
- L.L. Ivanov. Antarctica: Livingston Island and Greenwich, Robert, Snow and Smith Islands. Scale 1:120000 topographic map. Troyan: Manfred Wörner Foundation, 2009. ISBN 978-954-92032-6-4
- Antarctic Digital Database (ADD). Scale 1:250000 topographic map of Antarctica. Scientific Committee on Antarctic Research (SCAR). Since 1993, regularly upgraded and updated.
