= Malamir Knoll =

Location of Greenwich Island in the South Shetland Islands.

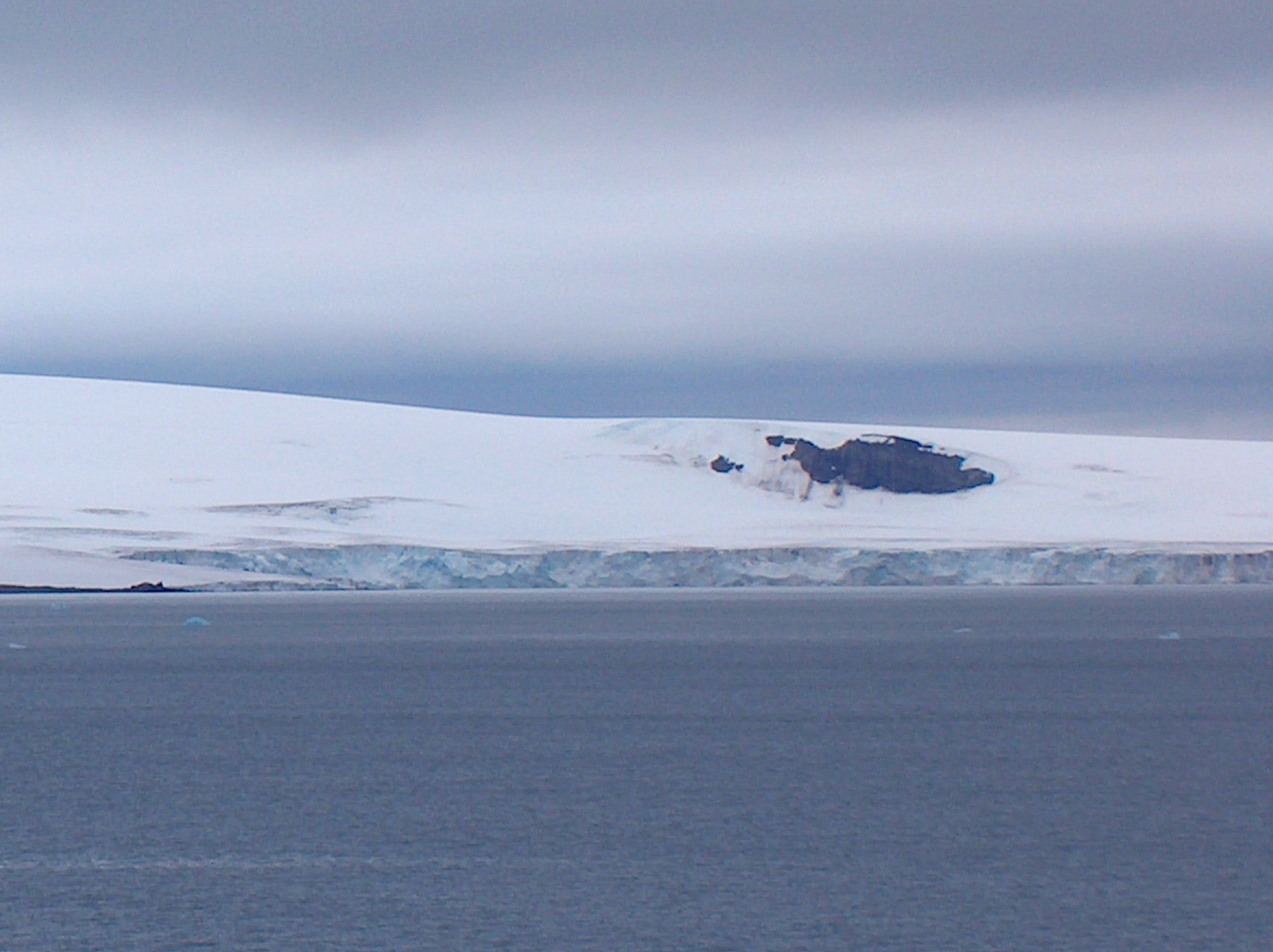
Malamir Knoll from Half Moon Island.

Topographic map of Livingston Island, Greenwich, Robert, Snow and Smith Islands.

Malamir Knoll (Malamirova Mogila \ma-la-'mi-ro-va mo-'gi-la\) rises to 200 m in the southeast extremity of the Dryanovo Heights, Greenwich Island in the South Shetland Islands, Antarctica. It has steep and ice-free southwest slopes and was named after the Bulgarian ruler Khan Malamir, 831-836 AD.

The knoll is located at 62°30′10″S 59°48′13″W, which is 2.37 km east of Tile Ridge, and 2.9 km northeast of Triangle Point, 2.65 km north-northwest of Spit Point and 3.78 km west by south of Labbé Point (Bulgarian topographic survey Tangra 2004/05 and mapping in 2005 and 2009).

== Maps ==
- L.L. Ivanov et al. Antarctica: Livingston Island and Greenwich Island, South Shetland Islands. Scale 1:100000 topographic map. Sofia: Antarctic Place-names Commission of Bulgaria, 2005.
- L.L. Ivanov. Antarctica: Livingston Island and Greenwich, Robert, Snow and Smith Islands. Scale 1:120000 topographic map. Troyan: Manfred Wörner Foundation, 2009.
