= Kaspichan Point =

Point on the southwest coast of Greenwich Island, Antarctica

Coordinates: 62°30′56″S 59°52′04″W

Location of Greenwich Island in the South Shetland Islands.

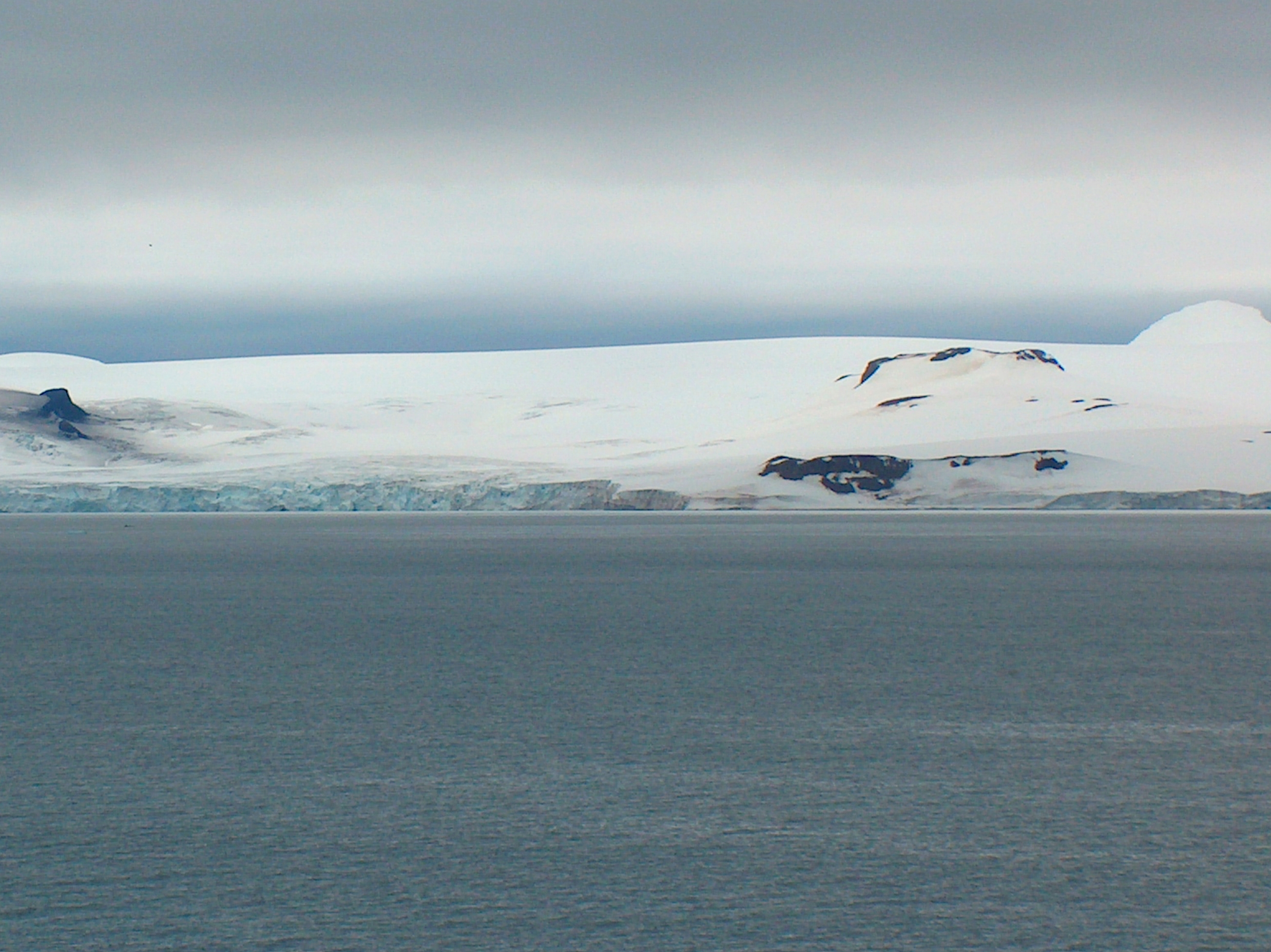
Kaspichan Point

Topographic map of Livingston Island, Greenwich, Robert, Snow and Smith Islands.

Kaspichan Point (Nos Kaspichan \'nos 'ka-spi-chan\) is a point on the southeast side of the entrance to Kramolin Cove on the southwest coast of Greenwich Island, Antarctica. Situated next west of Hebrizelm Hill, 1.4 km northwest of Triangle Point, 2 km south-southwest of Tile Ridge, and 2 km southeast of Yovkov Point. Shape enhanced by recent glacier retreat northwest of the point. Bulgarian topographic survey Tangra 2004/05. Named after the town of Kaspichan in northeastern Bulgaria.

== See also ==
- Kaspichan

== Maps ==
- L.L. Ivanov et al. Antarctica: Livingston Island and Greenwich Island, South Shetland Islands. Scale 1:100000 topographic map. Sofia: Antarctic Place-names Commission of Bulgaria, 2005.
- L.L. Ivanov. Antarctica: Livingston Island and Greenwich, Robert, Snow and Smith Islands. Scale 1:120000 topographic map. Troyan: Manfred Wörner Foundation, 2009. ISBN 978-954-92032-6-4
