= Mohelnice (Plzeň-South District) =

- Municipality
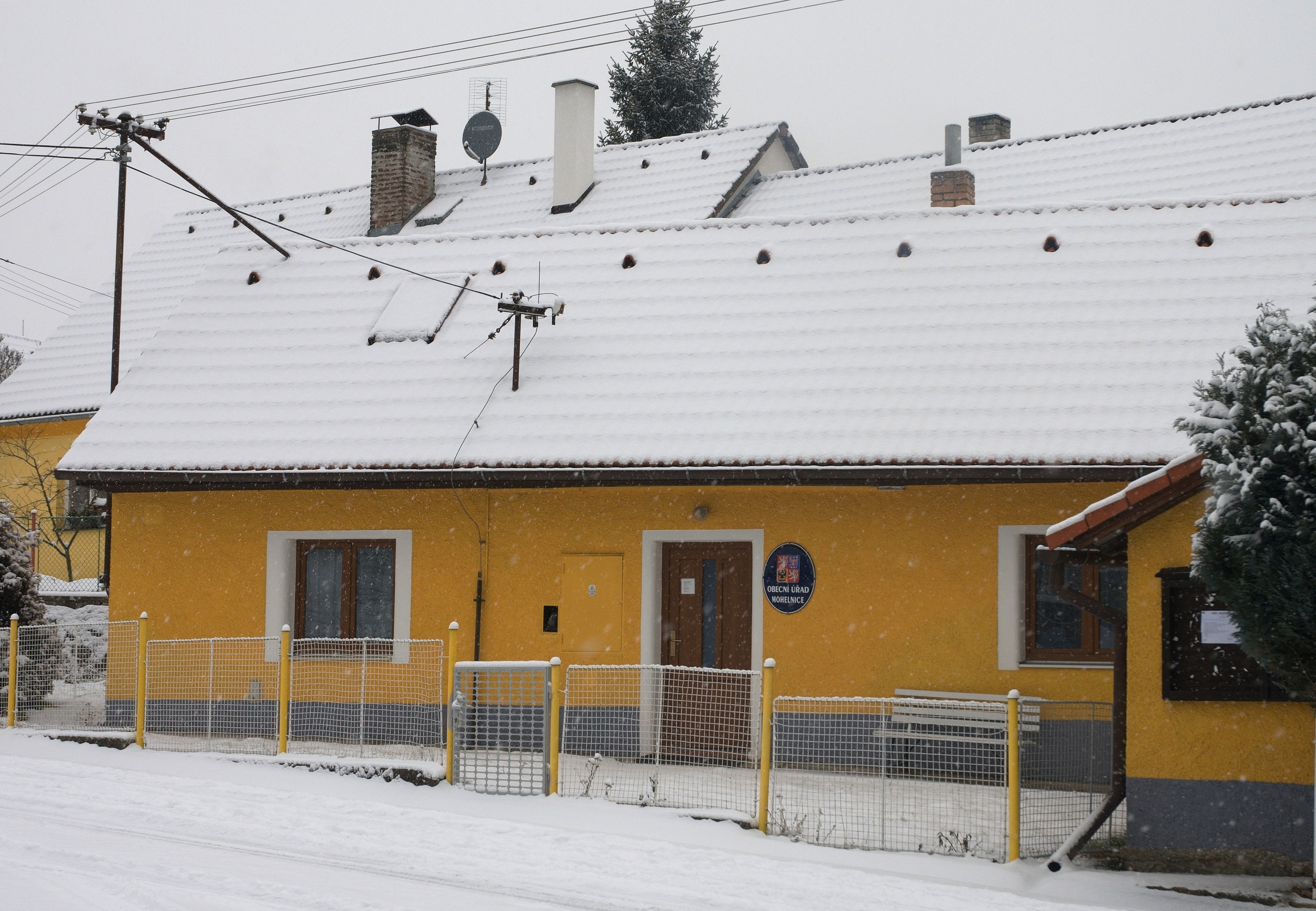
- Municipal office

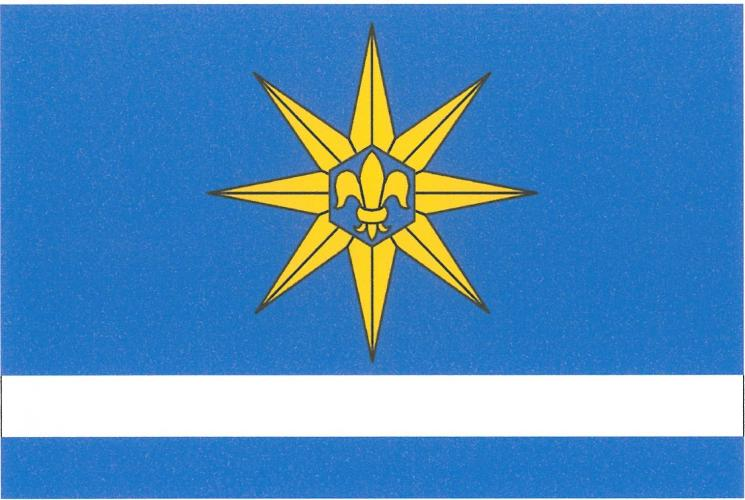
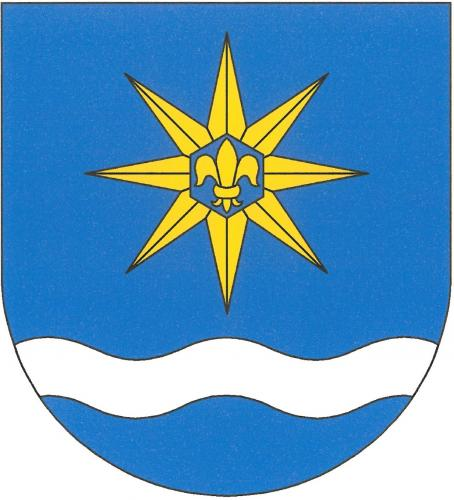
- Flag Coat of arms

- Location in the Czech Republic
- Coordinates: 49°28′51″N 13°38′30″E
- Country: Czech Republic
- Region: Plzeň
- District: Plzeň-South
- First mentioned: 1552

Area
  - Total: 2.94 km^{2} (1.14 sq mi)
- Elevation: 430 m (1,410 ft)

Population (2026-01-01)
  - Total: 68
  - Density: 23/km^{2} (60/sq mi)
- Time zone: UTC+1 (CET)
  - Summer (DST): UTC+2 (CEST)
- Postal code: 335 01
- Website: www.obec-mohelnice.cz

Mohelnice is a municipality and village in Plzeň-South District in the Plzeň Region of the Czech Republic. It has about 70 inhabitants.

Mohelnice lies approximately 36 kilometres (22 mi) south-east of Plzeň and 88 km (55 mi) south-west of Prague.

== Demographics ==
Historical population
Year	Pop.	±%
1869	243	—
1880	202	−16.9%
1890	203	+0.5%
1900	220	+8.4%
1910	229	+4.1%
1921	200	−12.7%
1930	195	−2.5%
1950	148	−24.1%
1961	160	+8.1%
1970	141	−11.9%
1980	114	−19.1%
1991	79	−30.7%
2001	70	−11.4%
2011	70	+0.0%
2021	62	−11.4%
Source: Censuses
