= Kramolin Cove =

Location of Greenwich Island in the South Shetland Islands.

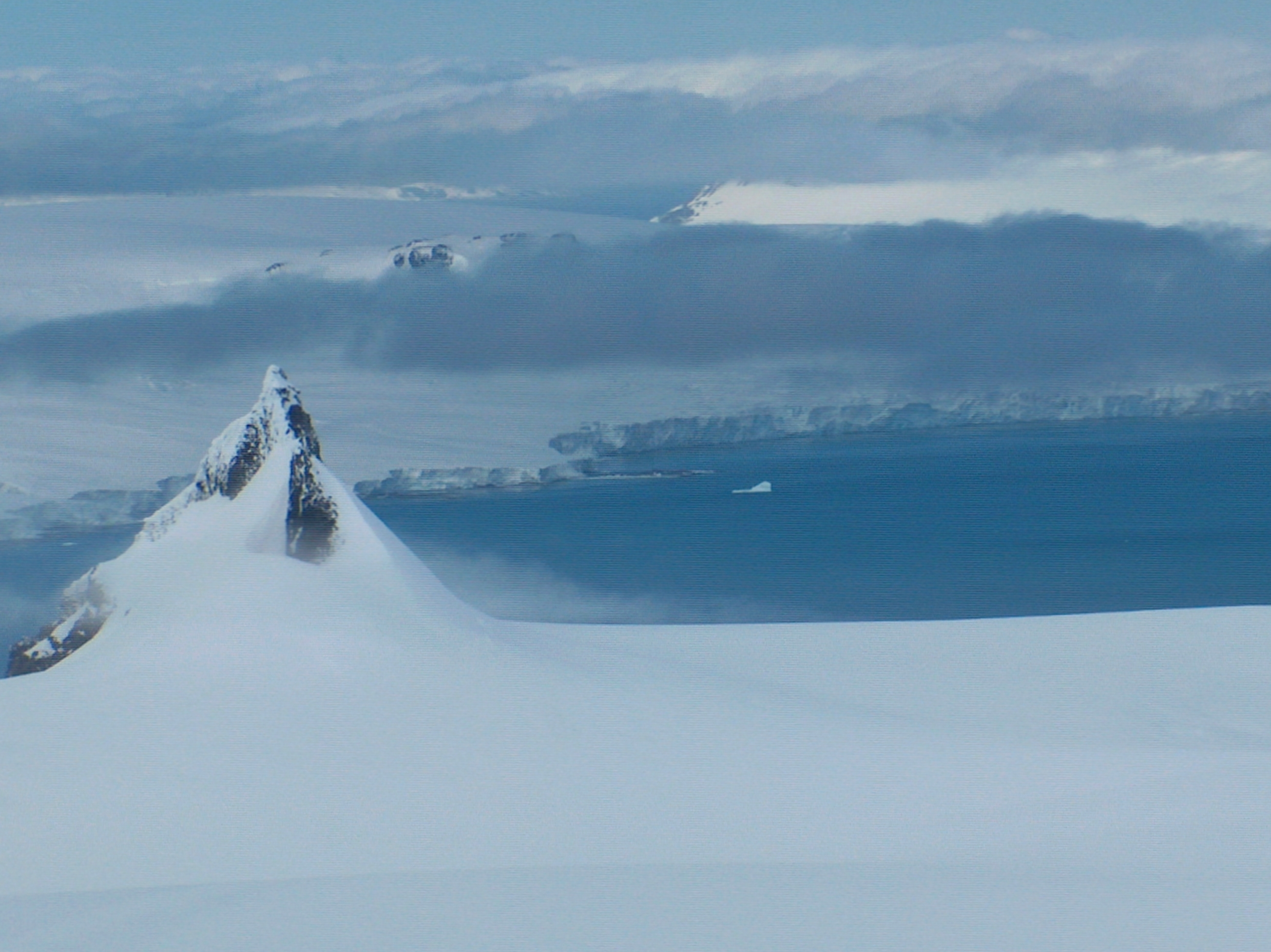
Kramolin Cove (on the opposite coast, to the right of Yovkov Point).

Topographic map of Livingston Island, Greenwich, Robert, Snow and Smith Islands.

Kramolin Cove (Bulgarian: залив Крамолин, romanized: zaliv Kramolin, IPA: [ˈzalif krɐmoˈlin]) is the 1.92 km (1.19 miles) wide cove indenting for 900 metres (3,000 ft) the southwest coast of Greenwich Island in the South Shetland Islands, Antarctica. It is entered between Yovkov Point and Kaspichan Point. Shape enhanced as a result of Murgash Glacier’s retreat in the late 20th and early 21st century. Bulgarian topographic survey Tangra 2004/05. The area was visited by early 19th century sealers.

The cove is named after the settlement of Kramolin in northern Bulgaria.

== Location ==
Kramolin Cove is centred at 62°30′37″S 59°53′00″W. Bulgarian mapping in 2009.

== Map ==
- L.L. Ivanov. Antarctica: Livingston Island and Greenwich, Robert, Snow and Smith Islands. Scale 1:120000 topographic map. Troyan: Manfred Wörner Foundation, 2009. ISBN 978-954-92032-6-4
