= Kramolin, Bulgaria =

Kramolin
- Village
- Location within Bulgaria
- Coordinates: 43°08′20″N 25°04′37″E
- Country: Bulgaria
- Province: Gabrovo Province
- Municipality: Sevlievo
- Time zone: UTC+2 (EET)
  - Summer (DST): UTC+3 (EEST)

Kramolin is a village in the municipality of Sevlievo, in Gabrovo Province, in northern central Bulgaria.

Kramolin Cove in Greenwich Island in the South Shetland Islands, Antarctica is named after Kramolin.
