= Snezhina =

Snezhina Снежина
- Village
- Location in Bulgaria
- Coordinates: 43.163°N 27.265°E
- Country: Bulgaria
- Province: Varna Province
- Municipality: Provadiya Municipality
- Elevation: 131 m (430 ft)

Population (2015-09-15)
  - Total: 539
- Postal code: 9244

Snezhina (Bulgarian: Снежина) is a village in eastern Bulgaria. It is located in the municipality of Provadiya, Varna Province.

As of September 2015 the village had a population of 539.
