= Tylis =

3rd century capital of a Balkan Celtic state

Coordinates: 42°35′00″N 25°33′00″E

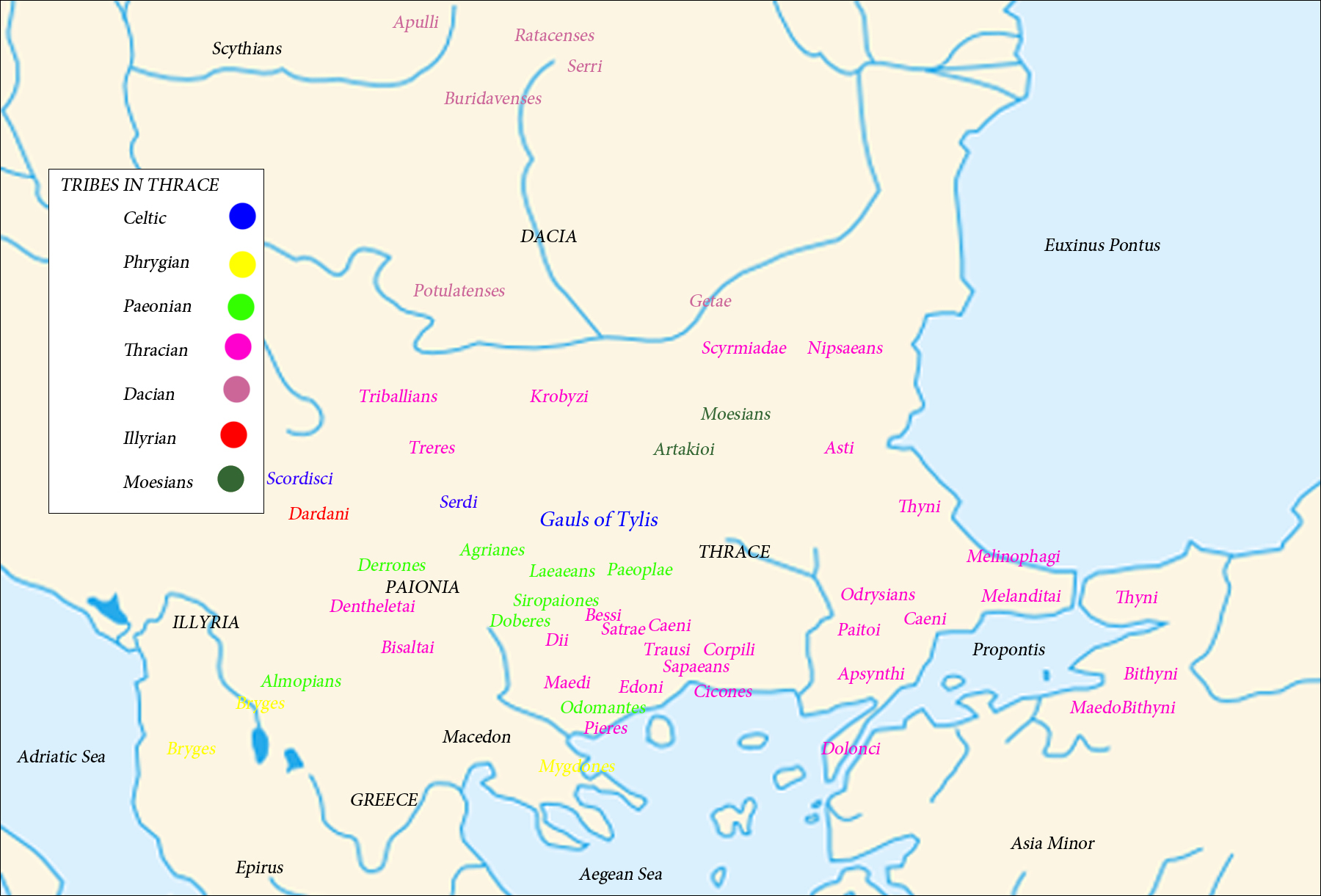
Tribes in Thrace. Celtic peoples, including the Gauls of Tylis, are labelled in blue.

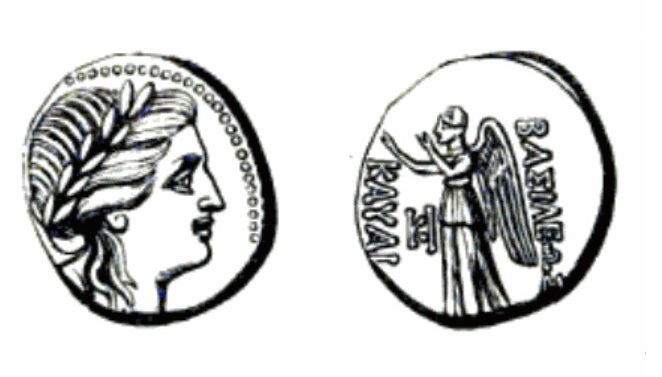
Copper coin of Cavarus, the last king of Tylis

Tylis (Greek: Τύλις) or Tyle was a capital of a short-lived Balkan state mentioned by Polybius that was founded by Celts led by Comontorius in the 3rd century BC. Following their invasion of Thrace and Greece in 279 BC, the Gauls were defeated by the Macedonian king Antigonus II Gonatas in the Battle of Lysimachia in 277 BC, after which they turned inland to Thrace and founded their kingdom at Tylis. It was located near the eastern edge of the Haemus (Balkan) Mountains in what is now eastern Bulgaria. Some bands of Celts, namely the Tectosages, Tolistobogii and Trocmi, did not settle in Thrace, but crossed into Asia Minor to become known as the Galatians. The last king of Tylis was Cavarus who maintained good relations with the city of Byzantium. His capital was destroyed by the Thracians in 212 BC and this was also the end of his kingdom. The modern Bulgarian village of Tulovo in Stara Zagora Province now occupies the site.

== Honours ==
Tile Ridge on Greenwich Island in the South Shetland Islands, Antarctica is named for Tylis.
