= Provadiya Hook =

Gravel barrier spit in Antarctica

Coordinates: 62°31′47″S 59°47′28″W

Location of Greenwich Island in the South Shetland Islands.

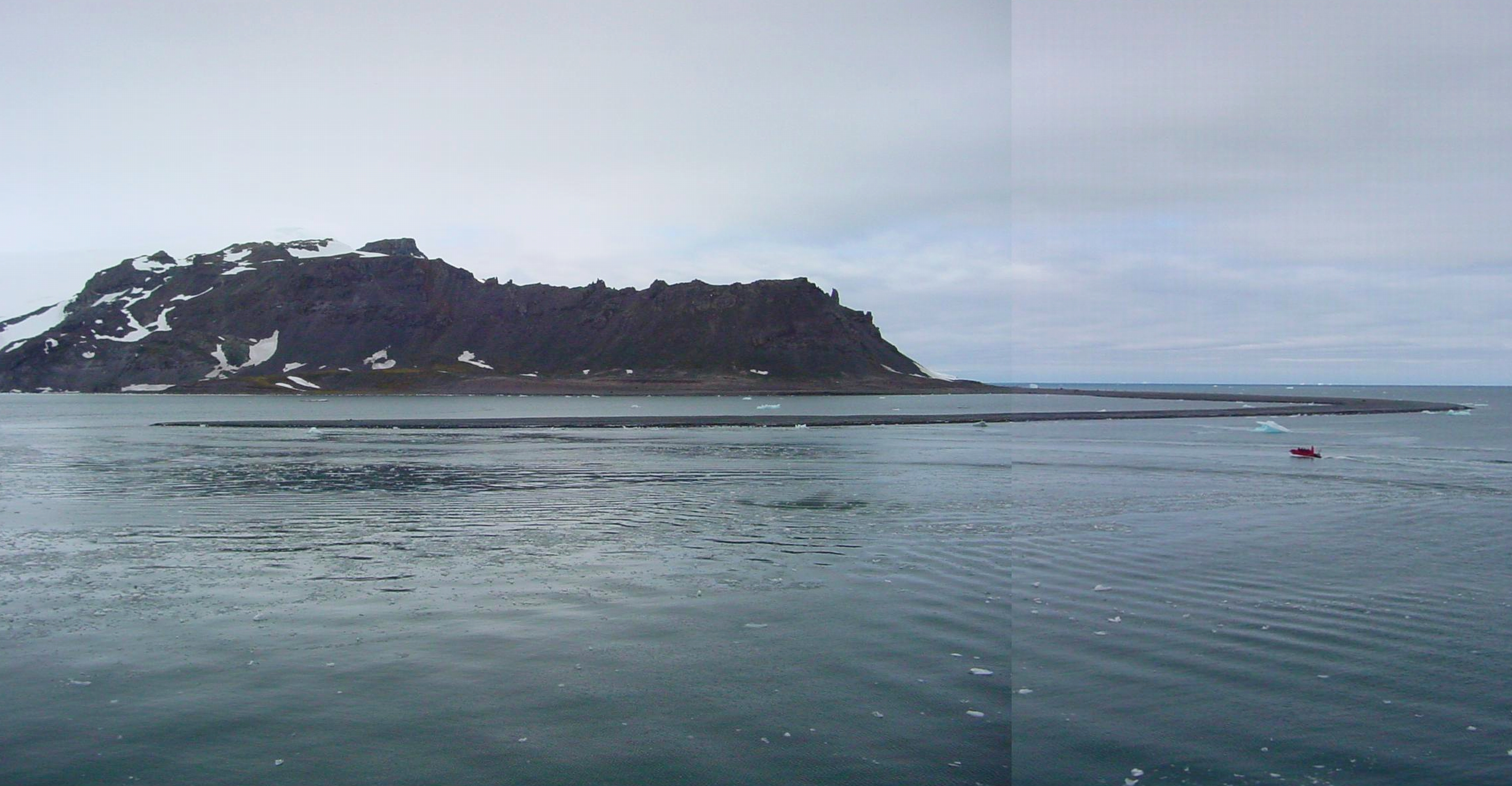
Provadiya Hook from Shopski Cove, with Oborishte Ridge in the background.

Topographic map of Livingston Island, Greenwich, Robert, Snow and Smith Islands.

Provadiya Hook (Bulgarian: Провадийска коса, romanized: Provadiyska Kosa, IPA: [provɐˈdijskɐ koˈsa]) is a gravel barrier spit separating the inner Yankee Harbour in Greenwich Island, Antarctica from the outer Shopski Cove and McFarlane Strait. Boomerang-shaped, extending 700 m northwestward from the southwest extremity of Oborishte Ridge to a point forming the southeast side of the entrance to Shopski Cove, and named Provadiya Point in association, then extending 500 m northwards to end up in Spit Point, the latter forming the south side of the entrance to Yankee Harbour. British mapping in 1968. Named after the town of Provadiya in Northeastern Bulgaria.

== Maps ==
- L.L. Ivanov et al. Antarctica: Livingston Island and Greenwich Island, South Shetland Islands. Scale 1:100000 topographic map. Sofia: Antarctic Place-names Commission of Bulgaria, 2005.
- L.L. Ivanov. Antarctica: Livingston Island and Greenwich, Robert, Snow and Smith Islands. Scale 1:120000 topographic map. Troyan: Manfred Wörner Foundation, 2009. ISBN 978-954-92032-6-4
