= Křešín (Pelhřimov District) =

- Municipality
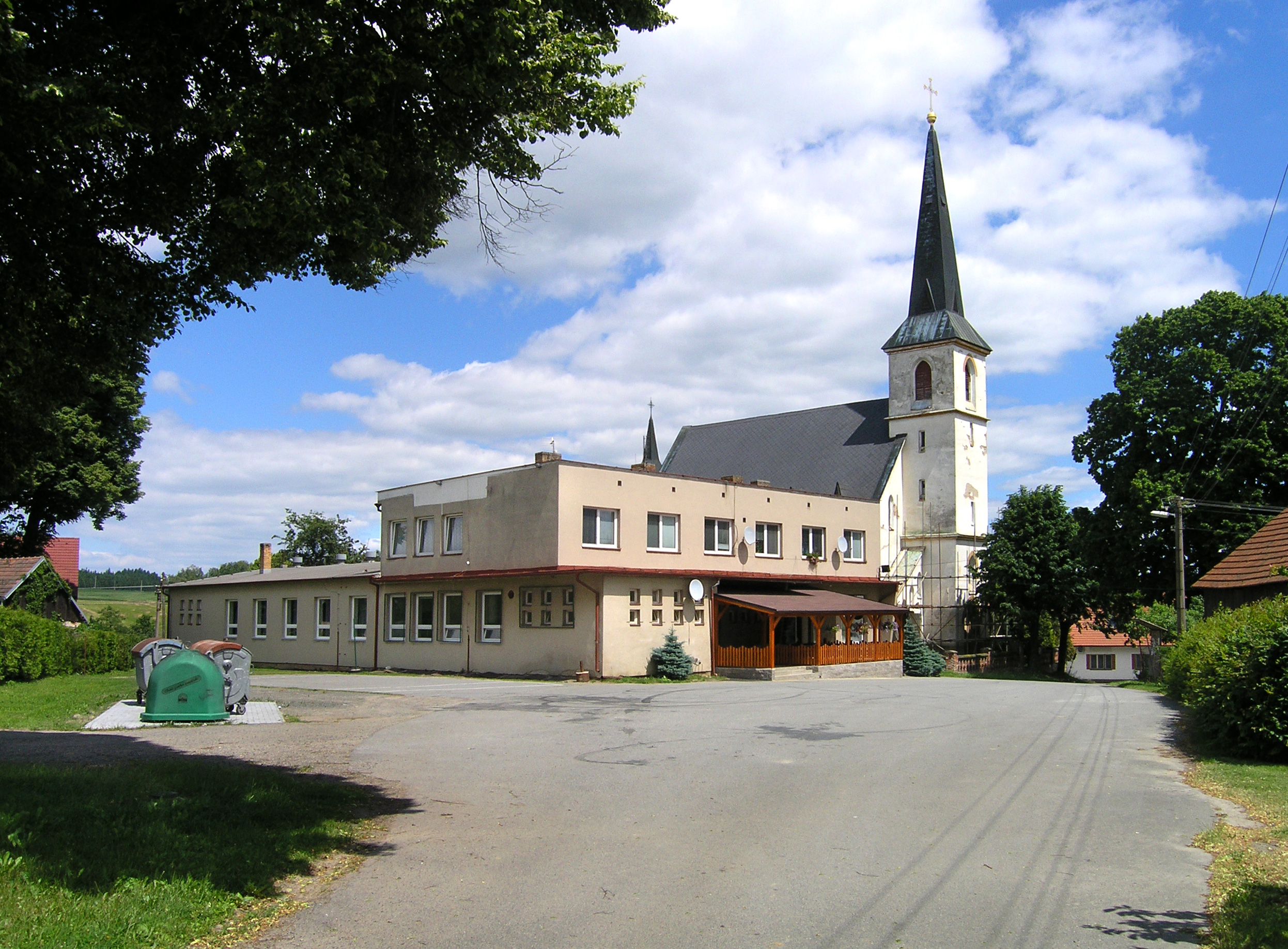
- Restaurant and Church of Saint Bartholomew

- Location in the Czech Republic
- Coordinates: 49°34′54″N 15°2′38″E
- Country: Czech Republic
- Region: Vysočina
- District: Pelhřimov
- First mentioned: 1318

Area
  - Total: 11.10 km^{2} (4.29 sq mi)
- Elevation: 512 m (1,680 ft)

Population (2026-01-01)
  - Total: 189
  - Density: 17.0/km^{2} (44.1/sq mi)
- Time zone: UTC+1 (CET)
  - Summer (DST): UTC+2 (CEST)
- Postal codes: 394 24, 395 01
- Website: www.kresin.cz

Křešín is a municipality and village in Pelhřimov District in the Vysočina Region of the Czech Republic. It has about 200 inhabitants.

Křešín lies approximately 22 kilometres (14 mi) north-west of Pelhřimov, 45 km (28 mi) north-west of Jihlava, and 72 km (45 mi) south-east of Prague.

== Administrative division ==
Křešín consists of five municipal parts (in brackets population according to the 2021 census):

- Křešín (80)
- Blažnov (15)
- Čeněnice (7)
- Kramolín (14)
- Mohelnice (44)

== Demographics ==
Historical population
Year	Pop.	±%
1869	908	—
1880	913	+0.6%
1890	821	−10.1%
1900	745	−9.3%
1910	800	+7.4%
1921	812	+1.5%
1930	727	−10.5%
1950	470	−35.4%
1961	451	−4.0%
1970	360	−20.2%
1980	282	−21.7%
1991	203	−28.0%
2001	166	−18.2%
2011	138	−16.9%
2021	160	+15.9%
Source: Censuses
