= Cavarus =

Celtic king in Thrace and the last king of Tylis

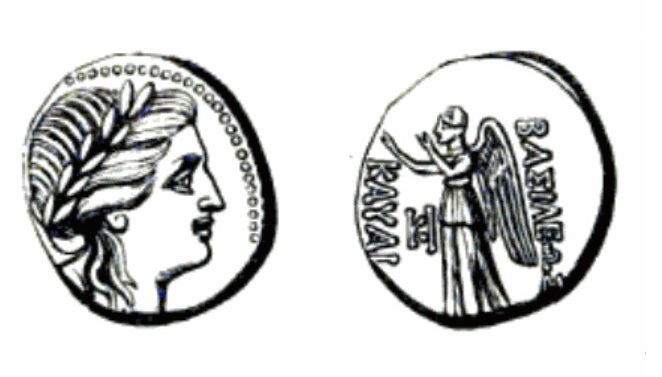
Copper coin of Cavarus

Cavarus was a Celtic king in Thrace and the last king of Tylis. Under Cavarus, Tylis was destroyed by the Thracians in 212 BC.
