= Yankee Harbour =

Bay of Antarctica

Coordinates: 62°32′S 59°47′W

Location of Greenwich Island in the South Shetland Islands

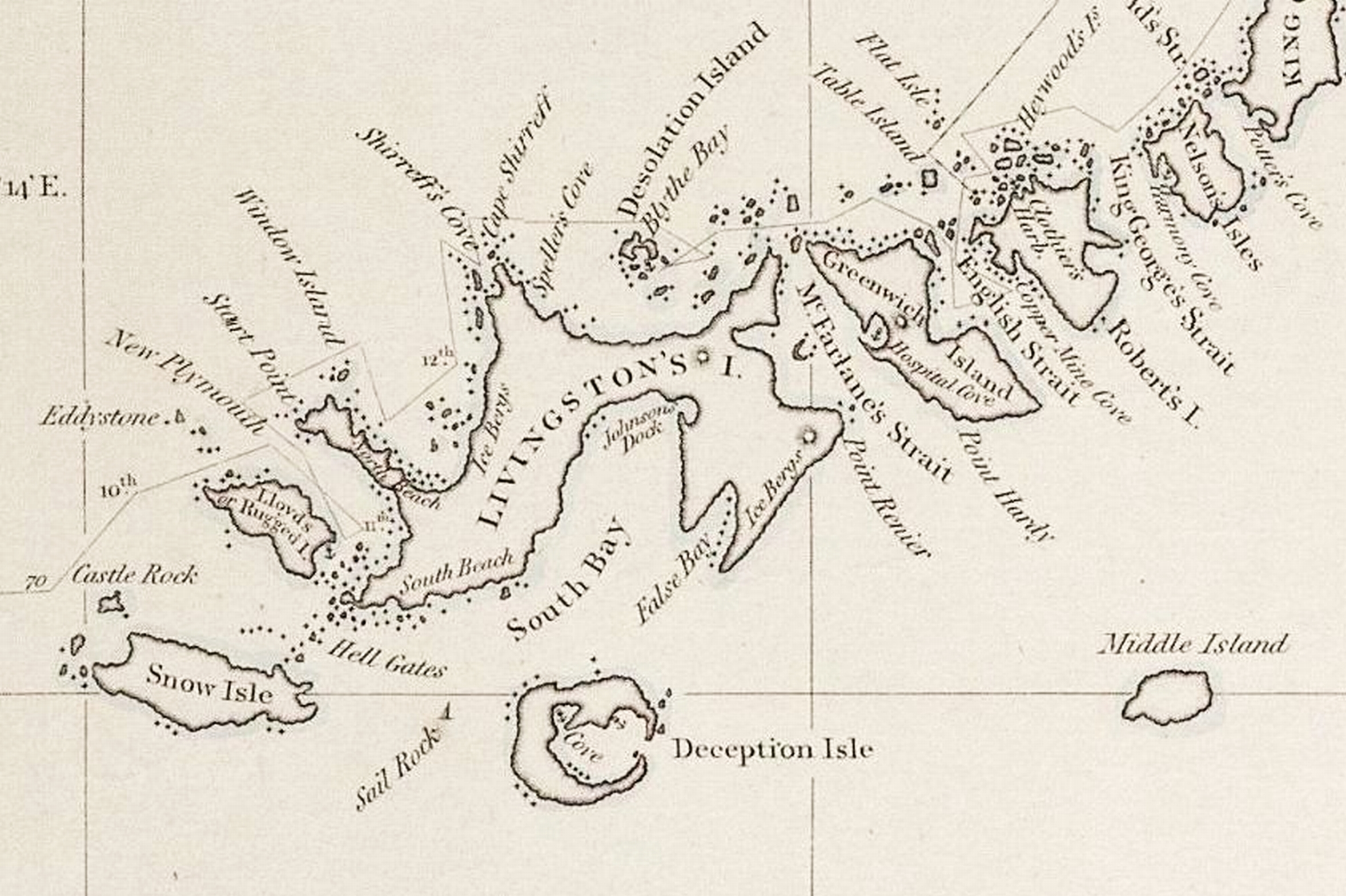
Fragment of George Powell's 1822 chart of the South Shetland Islands and South Orkney Islands featuring Yankee Harbour (as 'Hospital Cove')

Topographic map of Livingston Island, Greenwich, Robert, Snow and Smith Islands

Yankee Harbour is a small inner harbour entered from Shopski Cove between Glacier Bluff and Spit Point, indenting the south-west side of Greenwich Island in the South Shetland Islands, Antarctica. It is 2.35 km (1.46 mi) long in west-south-west to east-north-east direction, and 1.6 km (0.99 mi) wide, and is bounded by Provadiya Hook to the south-west, Parvomay Neck to the north and east, and Kladara Beach to the south.

== History ==
Yankee Harbour was known to both American sealers and the British (who called it Hospital Cove) as early as 1820, and this name is now established in international usage. Port Foster, the crater harbour of Deception Island, has at times also been referred to as Yankee Harbour.

=== Historic site ===
A plaque commemorating the achievements of Captain Andrew MacFarlane, who in 1820 explored the Antarctic Peninsula area in the brigantine Dragon, has been designated a Historic Site or Monument (HSM 57), following a proposal by Chile and the United Kingdom to the Antarctic Treaty Consultative Meeting.

== Flora and fauna ==
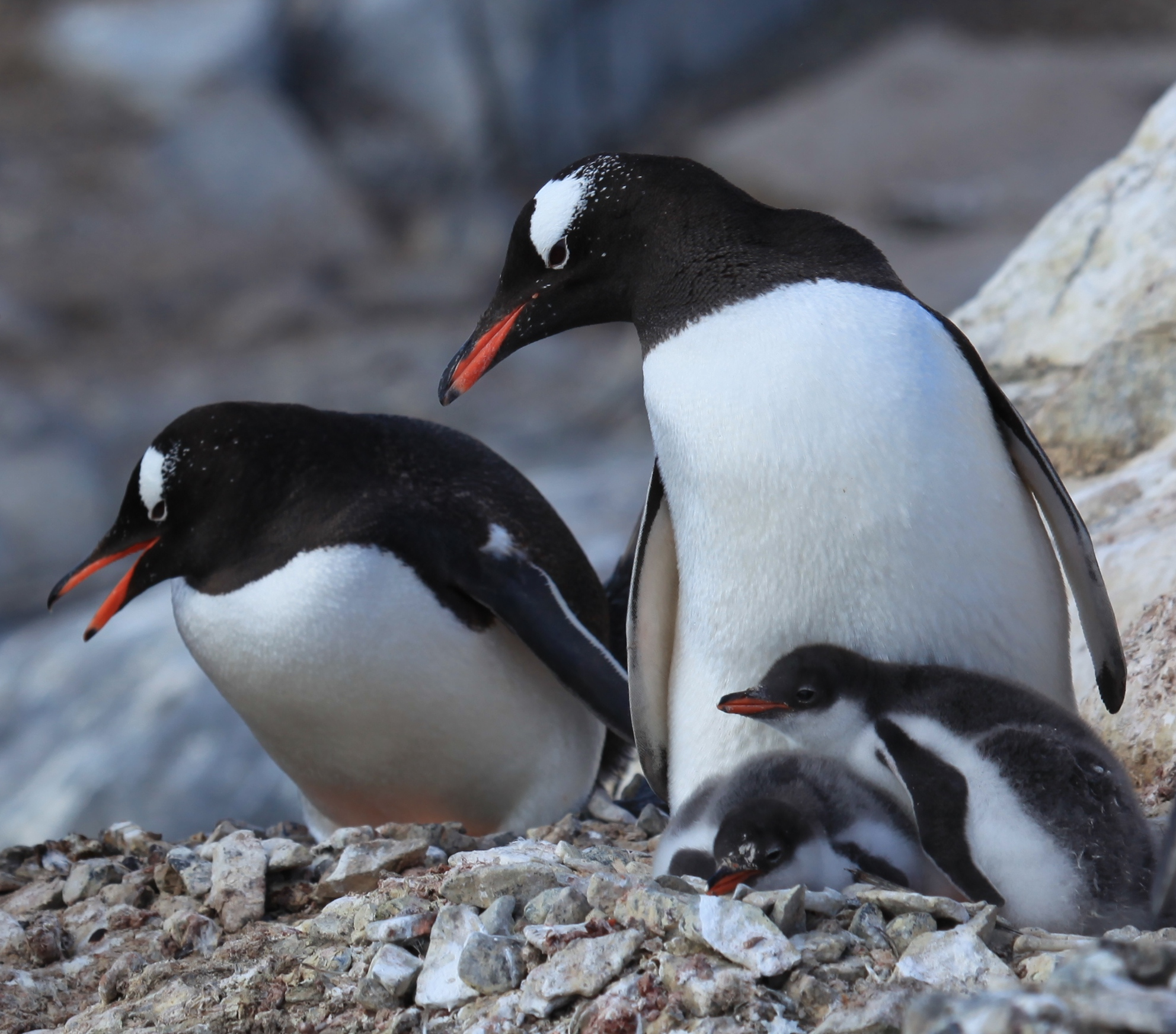
The site is an important for nesting gentoo penguins

As well as mosses, lichens and algae, the flowering plants Antarctic hairgrass and Antarctic pearlwort occur. The site has been identified as an Important Bird Area by BirdLife International because it supports a breeding colony of about 5000 pairs of gentoo penguins. Skuas, Wilson's storm petrels and snowy sheathbills are also thought to nest there. Southern elephant seals, Weddell seals and Antarctic fur seals regularly haul out on the beaches.

== Maps ==
- Chart of South Shetland including Coronation Island, &c. from the exploration of the sloop Dove in the years 1821 and 1822 by George Powell Commander of the same. Scale ca. 1:200000. London: Laurie, 1822
- L.L. Ivanov. Antarctica: Livingston Island and Greenwich, Robert, Snow and Smith Islands. Scale 1:120000 topographic map. Troyan: Manfred Wörner Foundation, 2010. ISBN 978-954-92032-9-5 (First edition 2009. ISBN 978-954-92032-6-4)
- Antarctic Digital Database (ADD). Scale 1:250000 topographic map of Antarctica. Scientific Committee on Antarctic Research (SCAR). Since 1993, regularly upgraded and updated.
- L.L. Ivanov. Antarctica: Livingston Island and Smith Island. Scale 1:100000 topographic map. Manfred Wörner Foundation, 2017. ISBN 978-619-90008-3-0
