= Shopski Cove =

Cove in the South Shetland Islands, Antarctica

Location of Greenwich Island in the South Shetland Islands

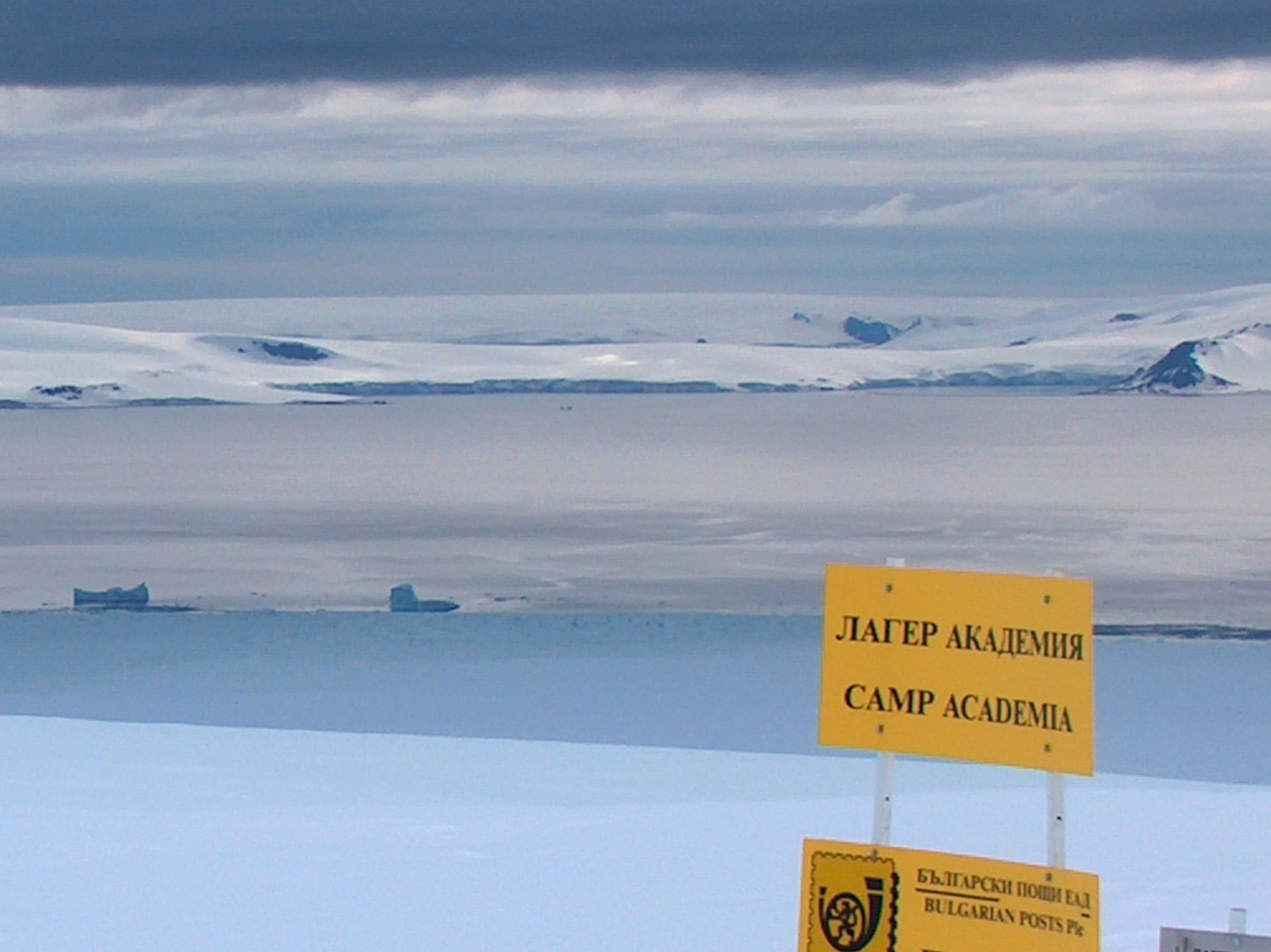
Shopski Cove from Camp Academia, with Huron Glacier and McFarlane Strait in the foreground

Topographic map of Livingston Island and Smith Island featuring Shopski Cove

Shopski Cove (Bulgarian: Шопски залив, romanized: Shopski zaliv, IPA: [ˈʃɔpski ˈzalif]) is a 2.6 km wide cove indenting for 1.9 km the southwest coast of Greenwich Island in the South Shetland Islands, Antarctica, between Triangle Point and the westernmost extremity of the moraine spit of Provadiya Hook protecting Yankee Harbour. Shape enhanced as a result of Bravo Glacier’s retreat in the late 20th and early 21st century. The area was visited by early 19th century sealers operating from Yankee Harbour.

The feature is named "after the Shoppe Region in Western Bulgaria."

== Location ==
The cove is located at 62°31′15″S 59°48′40″W. Bulgarian mapping in 2005 and 2009.

== Maps ==
- South Shetland Islands. Scale 1:200000 topographic map. DOS 610 Sheet W 62 58. Tolworth, UK, 1968.
- L.L. Ivanov et al. Antarctica: Livingston Island and Greenwich Island, South Shetland Islands. Scale 1:100000 topographic map. Sofia: Antarctic Place-names Commission of Bulgaria, 2005.
- L.L. Ivanov. Antarctica: Livingston Island and Greenwich, Robert, Snow and Smith Islands. Scale 1:120000 topographic map. Troyan: Manfred Wörner Foundation, 2009. ISBN 978-954-92032-6-4
- Antarctic Digital Database (ADD). Scale 1:250000 topographic map of Antarctica. Scientific Committee on Antarctic Research (SCAR). Since 1993, regularly updated.
- L.L. Ivanov. Antarctica: Livingston Island and Smith Island. Scale 1:100000 topographic map. Manfred Wörner Foundation, 2017. ISBN 978-619-90008-3-0
