= Tile Ridge =

Mountain in Antarctica

Location of Greenwich Island in the South Shetland Islands.

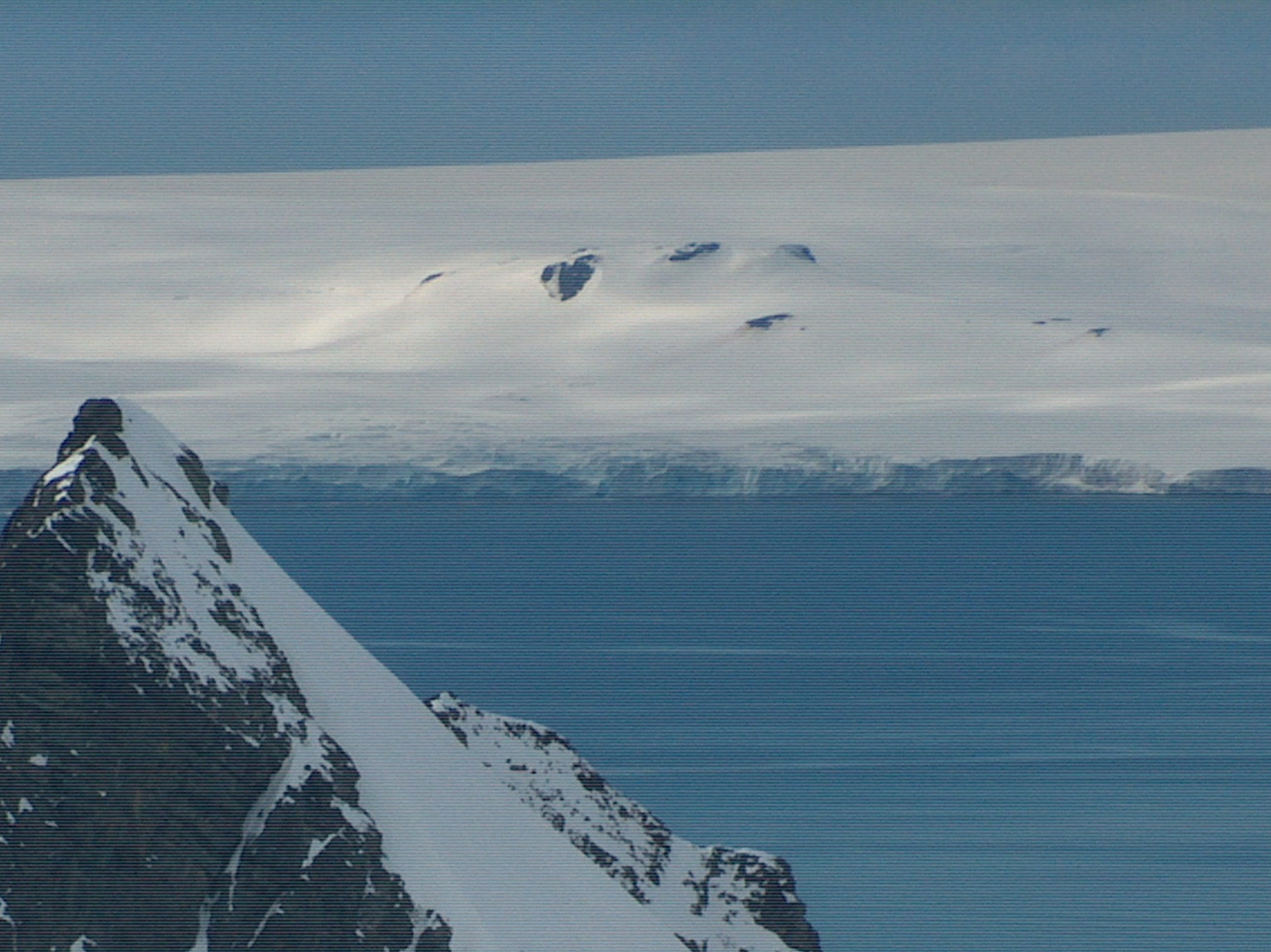
Tile Ridge from Kuzman Knoll in Livingston Island, with Atanasoff Nunatak and McFarlane Strait in the foreground.

Topographic map of Livingston Island, Greenwich, Robert, Snow and Smith Islands.

Tile Ridge (Rid Tile /ˈrid ˈti.le/) is a partly ice-free ridge of elevation 240 m in Dryanovo Heights, Greenwich Island in the South Shetland Islands, Antarctica.

The ridge is named after the ancient Tile (Tylis), capital town of the Celtic Kingdom in Thrace, 279–213 BC, and ancestor of the present Bulgarian settlement of Tulovo near Stara Zagora City.

== Location ==
The ridge is located at 62°29′58″S 59°50′57″W, which is 2.3 km east-southeast of Lloyd Hill, 2.55 km north of Triangle Point, and 2.37 km west of Malamir Knoll (Bulgarian topographic survey Tangra 2004/05 and mapping in 2009).

== See also ==
- List of Bulgarian toponyms in Antarctica

== Maps ==
- L.L. Ivanov et al. Antarctica: Livingston Island and Greenwich Island, South Shetland Islands. Scale 1:100000 topographic map. Sofia: Antarctic Place-names Commission of Bulgaria, 2005.
- L.L. Ivanov. Antarctica: Livingston Island and Greenwich, Robert, Snow and Smith Islands. Scale 1:120000 topographic map. Troyan: Manfred Wörner Foundation, 2009. ISBN 978-954-92032-6-4
