= Boris Drangov =

Bulgarian officer and warfare pedagogue

- Борис Дрангов
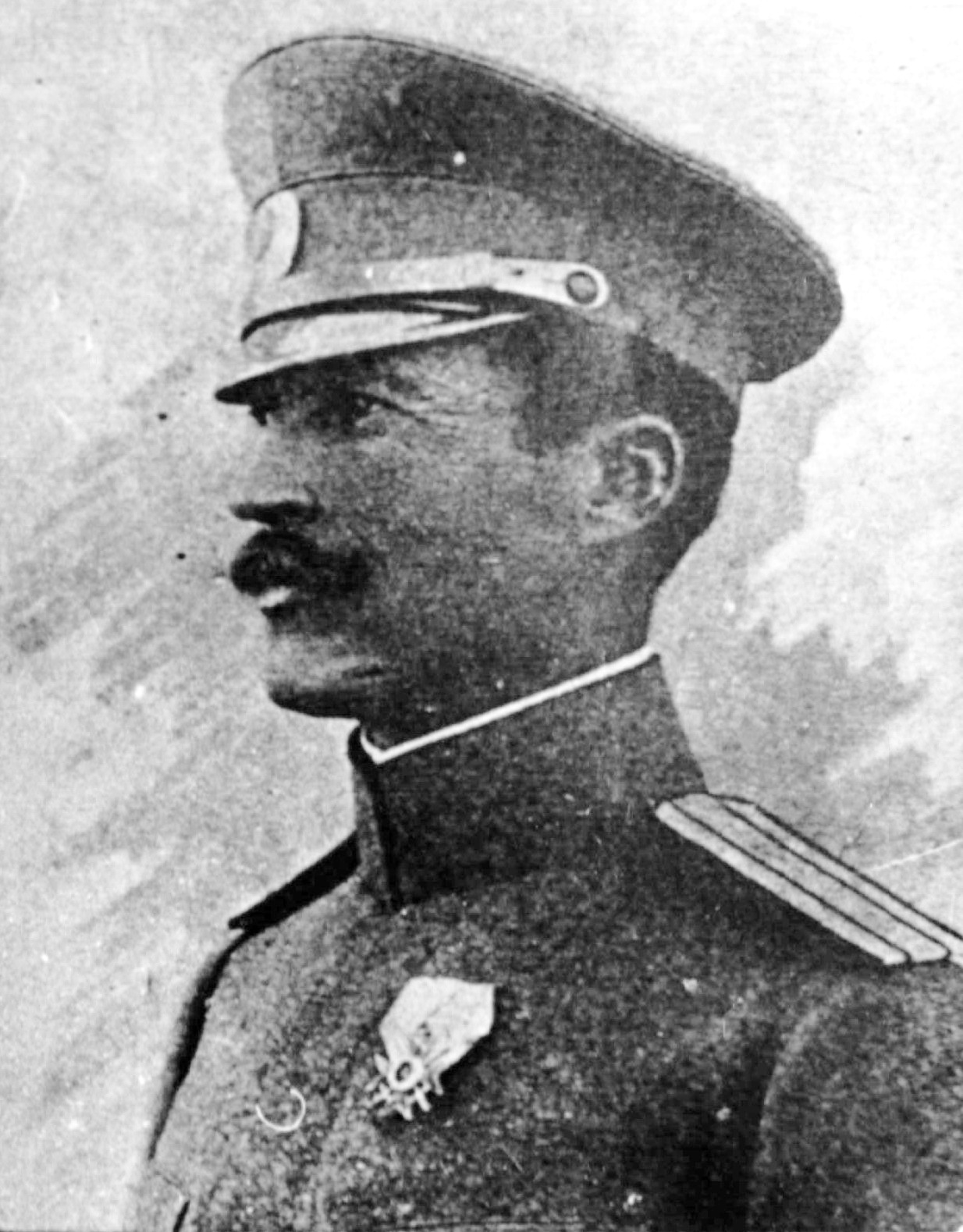
- Born: Boris Stoyanov Drangov; 15 March 1872; Skopje, Sanjak of Skopje, Ottoman Empire
- Died: 26 May 1917 (aged 45); Near Crna River bend, Kingdom of Bulgaria
- Burial place: Butel cemetery, Skopje
- Education: Military School of Sofia
- Spouse: Rayna Denkova Popova
- Military career
- Branch: Bulgarian Army
- Rank: Colonel (posthumously)
- Conflicts: Ilinden–Preobrazhenie Uprising; Balkan Wars; World War I
- Other work: Military pedagogue and theorist

Boris Stoyanov Drangov (Bulgarian: Борис Стоянов Дрангов; Macedonian: Борис Стојанов Дрангов; 3 March [15 March N.S.] 1872 – 26 May 1917) was a Bulgarian Army officer and warfare pedagogue. He participated in the Macedonian-Adrianopolitan revolutionary movement, as well as the Ilinden–Preobrazhenie Uprising, Balkan Wars and World War I.

== Biography ==
Boris Drangov was born on 3 March [15 March N.S.] 1872 in Skopje in Ottoman-ruled Macedonia (today the capital of North Macedonia), to the family of Stoyan Drangov and his wife Gyurgya. His father was a wine and timber merchant. He spent his childhood in Skopje. Drangov did not graduate from the Bulgarian Men's High School of Thessaloniki. In 1890, Drangov graduated with honours from the five-year Bulgarian Pedagogical School in Skopje. After passing his high school graduation exams in 1891, on 6 July of that same year, he enrolled as a cadet into the 13th class of the Military School in the capital of the Principality of Bulgaria - Sofia. He studied together with Gotse Delchev, Boris Sarafov, Petar Darvingov, Hristo Sarakinov, Yordan Venedikov and other future officers and participants of the Macedonian-Adrianopolitan revolutionary movement. At that time, a revolutionary circle was established by him, Gotse Delchev, Boris Sarafov, and Efrem Chuchkov, with the aim of working towards the liberation of Macedonia. This was contradictory with military regulations and on 10 June 1894, Drangov was dismissed from the school by the disciplinary committee. He was stripped of his rank of cadet-officer and transferred to the 3rd Cavalry Regiment of the Bulgarian Army in Plovdiv to complete his term of active military service. Taking into account the performance report published by the regiment's command, Drangov was re-admitted to the Military School on 11 October 1894, and enrolled in its senior class. Even as a cadet, Drangov wrote articles on military issues, which he later published as an officer. He graduated from the Military School in 1895. Drangov was commissioned as an officer and assigned as a platoon commander of the 3rd Cavalry Regiment in Plovdiv. In Plovdiv, he wrote the work Detailed Program for Training Young and Old Soldiers in the Infantry. On 21 January 1898, he was appointed as a junior officer in the Fourth Squadron of the 2nd Cavalry Regiment in Lom. In this period, he became more actively involved in the Macedonian-Adrianopolitan revolutionary movement by joining the underground officers' organisation, Bulgarian Officers' Brotherhoods, while maintaining correspondence with members of the Supreme Macedonian-Adrianople Committee (SMAC) and the Internal Macedonian Revolutionary Organisation (IMRO). Drangov also expressed a desire to get to know the Macedonian Bulgarian families who lived in the city. He was taken to the home of Bulgarian revolutionary Denko Nikolov Popov from Mlado Nagoričane and met his daughter Rayna. He and Rayna got married in October 1900.

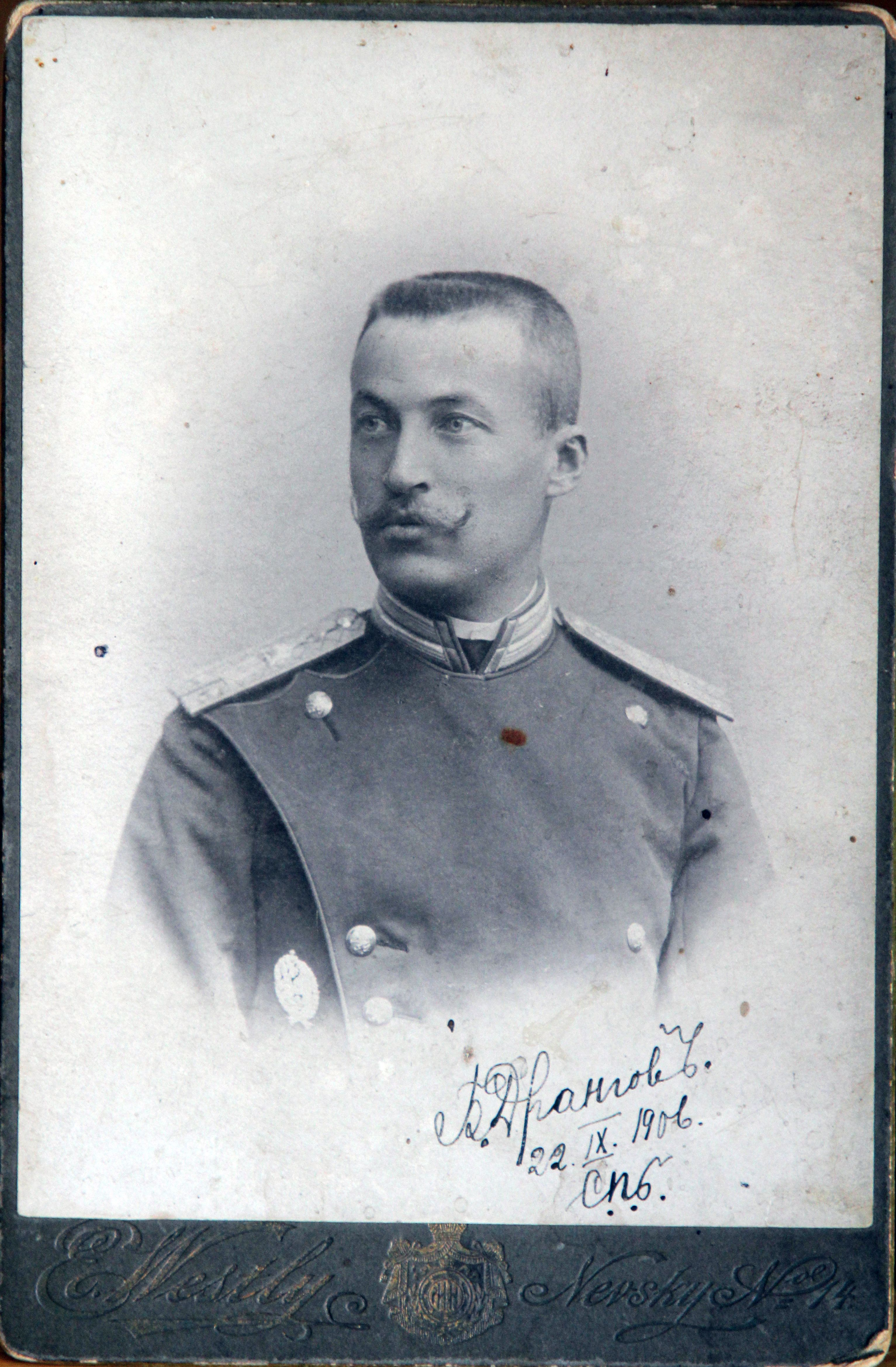
Boris Drangov, Saint Petersburg, c. 1906

Drangov (standing fourth from the left), alongside officers from the Fifth Macedonian Infantry Regiment, 1915

In 1903, under the pretext that he was going away on official business, he headed to Ottoman Macedonia. On the eve of the Ilinden–Preobrazhenie Uprising in 1903, he joined the detachment of lieutenant Vladislav Kovachev, his fellow citizen from Skopje, and voivode Atanas Babata. During the uprising, he participated in the battle on the Plavica mountain on 29 August 1903. Drangov, together with other three officers, directed the revolutionaries' actions. In 1904, Drangov won a competition for specialisation at the Imperial Russian General Staff Academy in Saint Petersburg. After graduating in 1907, he served as a staff officer with the rank of captain in Tarnovo, Shumen and Sofia. Drangov also worked for the Bulgarian Ministry of War, while also conducting classes on military history at the School for Reserve Junior Lieutenants in Knyazhevo. In September 1910, after being promoted to the rank of major, he took up the post of military tactics instructor at the Military School in Sofia. From 1910 to 1912, together with his colleagues Aleksandar Protogerov, Kliment Krastev and Petar Darvingov, he led the revolutionary group of Bulgarian officers which succeeded SMAC. Drangov participated in the Balkan Wars. He was later awarded the fourth class of Bulgaria's Order of Bravery. During World War I, he was the commander of the 5th Infantry Regiment of the 11th Macedonian Infantry Division. In February 1915, the Minister of War, Major General Kliment Boyadzhiev, promoted Drangov to the next officer rank, lieutenant colonel. At the head of his forces, he participated in the victorious battles against Serbian and Montenegrin forces at Kalimanci, Kočani and Štip, as well as in the subsequent repulsion of the Anglo-French forces at Krivolak.

In April 1916, the High Command decided to establish a School for Reserve Second Lieutenants in Skopje. On 15 May, the army's commander-in-chief, General Nikola Zhekov, appointed him as the head of the newly formed school. Drangov used his time at the school to complete his long-conceived military-theoretical work, Remember the War, which was published in the same year. Although Drangov was the head of the School for only four months, it still ended up being called the "Drangov School". In September 1916, Drangov returned to the front as Chief of Staff of the 1st Infantry Division of the Dobruja front. On 18 March 1917, he was appointed as the commander of the 9th Infantry Plovdiv Regiment of the 2nd Infantry Division, which fought at the Crna River. During his life, Drangov was awarded two Orders of Bravery, the Order of Military Merit, the Order of Saint Anna, the Iron Cross, the Iron Crescent, and others. He published more than 150 articles, books and brochures, consisting of over 1,400 pages.

On 26 May 1917, Drangov was severely wounded by shrapnel from a shell at the position on Hill 1050, near the bend of the Crna River and died afterwards, despite attempts to save him. His comrades-in-arms mourned his death. His family and the headquarters of the 9th Plovdiv Infantry Regiment received telegrams of condolence. In recognition of his combat service, Drangov was posthumously promoted to the rank of colonel. Thousands of people attended his funeral in Skopje, with him being buried in the courtyard of the Church of Saint Demetrius. In the 1920s, the Serbian authorities moved his remains to the city's Butel cemetery.

== Family ==
Drangov's wife Rayna was one of the founders and an active member of the Macedonian Women's Union. Drangov raised his children strictly, making them sleep on boards with ordinary blankets, clean his shoes and sending them on errands. His son Kiril was an activist of IMRO, who killed himself as he was about to be arrested by the Bulgarian communist police. His grandson, Boris, graduated from the Sofia Theological Seminary and headed the Macedono-Bulgarian St. George Orthodox Church in Toronto. After the fall of communism, his granddaughter Rayna was a co-chairman of the IMRO-Union of Macedonian Societies in 1996.

== Honours ==
After his death, he was commemorated in Bulgarian military circles. In 1934, for the 17th anniversary of his death, the only issue of the special commemorative newspaper Drangov List was printed in the printing house of the Army Publishing Fund in Sofia. А youth association in Skopje with mostly members from Bulgaria, which was active during World War II in Yugoslav Macedonia, was named after him. His commemoration was renewed by the late communist and post-communist Bulgarian military. Three villages in Bulgaria bear his name: Drangovo, Kardzhali Province, Drangovo, Blagoevgrad Province and Drangovo, Plovdiv Province. Drangov Peak in the Breznik Heights on Greenwich Island, Antarctica, was also named after him. A memorial plaque honouring him was placed in Dobrich on the initiative of VMRO-BND in 1999, which was reportedly restored in 2018 with funds of the parliamentary group United Patriots after being damaged through vandalism. A monument in his honour was placed in Plovdiv in 2005, made by sculptor Atanas Karadechev. A class in the Vasil Levski National Military University beared his name in 2022.

== Literature ==
- Шишков, К., Полковник Борис Дрангов — избрани произведения, Военно издателство, София, 1985.
- Шишков, К., Преподавателят майор Борис Дрангов., „Военнисторически сборник“, 1985, № 5.
- Недев, Светлозар, Командването на българската войска през войните за национално обединение, Военноиздателски комплекс „Свети Георги Победоносец“, София, 1993, стр. 181.
- Борис Дрангов. Сборник материали и научни изследвания. София, 1993.
- Карнфилов, Ефрем. Борис Дрангов в: Ефрем Каранфилов, „Българи“, София, 1980.
- Узунов, Христо. Полковник Борис Дрангов, „Армейски преглед“, 1986, №10.
