= Kormesiy Peak =

Rocky peak in the South Shetland Islands, Antarctica

Coordinates: 62°32′42.4″S 59°37′02″W

Location of Greenwich Island in the South Shetland Islands.

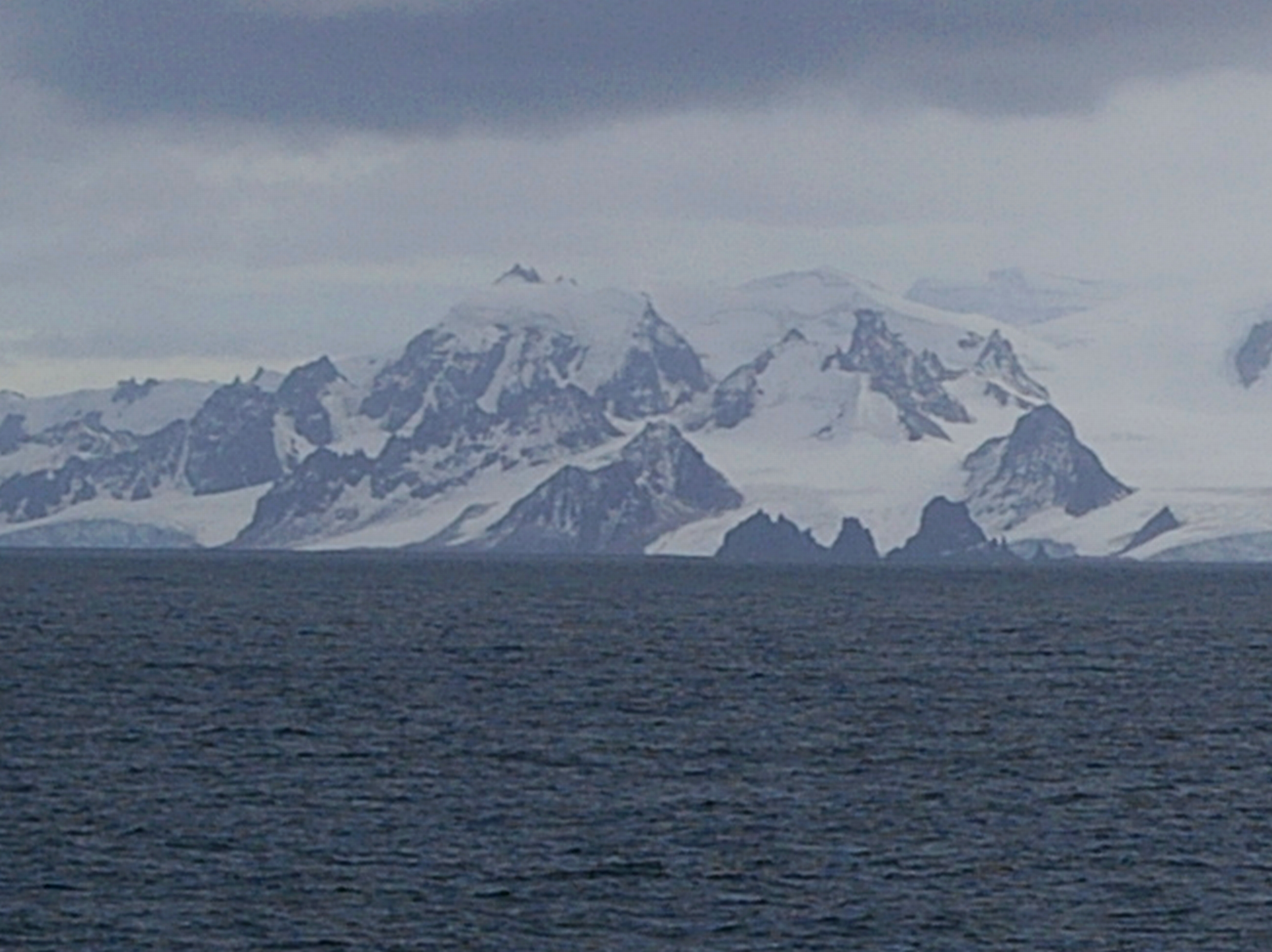
Kormesiy Peak from Bransfield Strait.

Topographic map of Livingston Island, Greenwich, Robert, Snow and Smith Islands.

Kormesiy Peak (Bulgarian: връх Кормесий, romanized: vrah Kormesiy, IPA: [ˈvrɤx korˈmɛsij]) is a rocky peak rising to 235 m in the southeast extremity of Breznik Heights on Greenwich Island in the South Shetland Islands, Antarctica. Situated on the southeast coast of the island, 2.17 km west of Fort Point, 800 m southwest of St. Kiprian Peak, 730 m southeast of Drangov Peak, and 430 m east of Ziezi Peak. Bulgarian topographic survey Tangra 2004/05 and mapping in 2009. Named after Khan Kormesiy of Bulgaria, 721-738 AD.

== Maps ==
- L.L. Ivanov et al. Antarctica: Livingston Island and Greenwich Island, South Shetland Islands. Scale 1:100000 topographic map. Sofia: Antarctic Place-names Commission of Bulgaria, 2005.
- L.L. Ivanov. Antarctica: Livingston Island and Greenwich, Robert, Snow and Smith Islands. Scale 1:120000 topographic map. Troyan: Manfred Wörner Foundation, 2009. ISBN 978-954-92032-6-4
