= Ziezi Peak =

Rocky peak in the South Shetland Islands, Antarctica

Location of Greenwich Island in the South Shetland Islands.

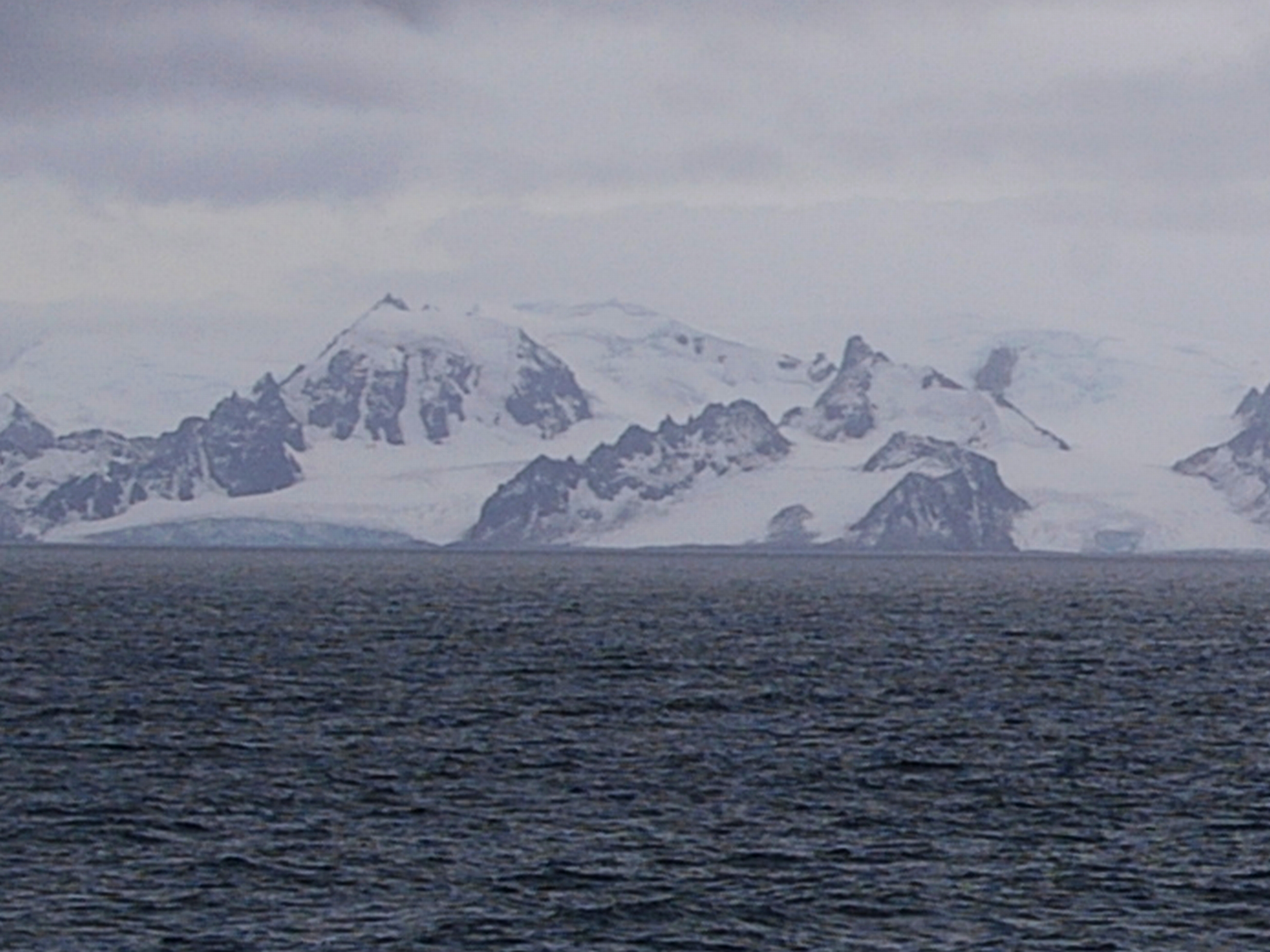
Ziezi Peak from Bransfield Strait, with Viskyar Ridge on the left and Kormesiy Peak on the right.

Topographic map of Livingston Island, Greenwich, Robert, Snow and Smith Islands.

Ziezi Peak (Bulgarian: връх Зиези, romanized: vrah Ziezi, IPA: [ˈvrɤɣ ziˈɛzi]) ia s rocky peak rising to 320 m in the southeast extremity of Breznik Heights on Greenwich Island in the South Shetland Islands, Antarctica overlooking Targovishte Glacier to the west.

The feature is named after Ziezi, the mythical grandson of Noah, from whom the Bulgars descended, according to the 354 AD Roman Chronograph of Ravenna.

== Location ==
The peak is located at 62°32′46.2″S 59°37′30.5″W which is 1.35 km east of Viskyar Ridge, 500 m south of Drangov Peak and 430 m west of Kormesiy Peak. Bulgarian topographic survey Tangra 2004/05 and mapping in 2009.

== Maps ==
- L.L. Ivanov et al. Antarctica: Livingston Island and Greenwich Island, South Shetland Islands. Scale 1:100000 topographic map. Sofia: Antarctic Place-names Commission of Bulgaria, 2005.
- L.L. Ivanov. Antarctica: Livingston Island and Greenwich, Robert, Snow and Smith Islands. Scale 1:120000 topographic map. Troyan: Manfred Wörner Foundation, 2009. ISBN 978-954-92032-6-4
