= Drangov Peak =

Mountain in Greenwich Island, South Shetland Islands, Antarctica

Coordinates: 62°32′32″S 59°37′48″W

Location of Greenwich Island in the South Shetland Islands.

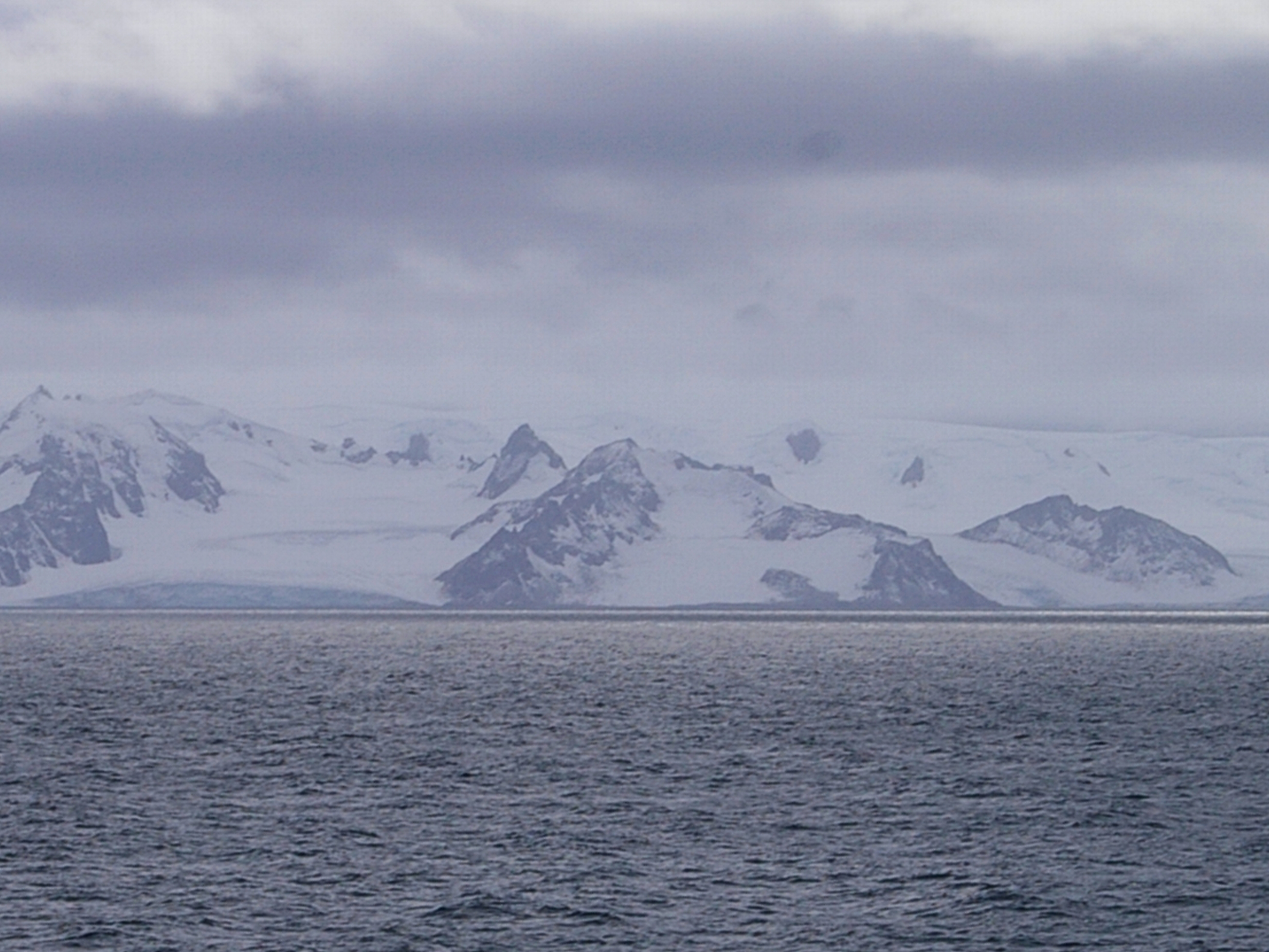
Drangov Peak

Topographic map of Livingston Island, Greenwich, Robert, Snow and Smith Islands.

Drangov Peak (Bulgarian: Дрангов връх, romanized: Drangov vrah, IPA: [ˈdraŋɡov ˈvrɤx]) is a peak rising to 430 m in the southeast extremity of Breznik Heights on Greenwich Island, Antarctica. Situated 360 m southeast of Vratsa Peak, 1.45 km east by south of the highest point of Viskyar Ridge, 2.8 km west of Fort Point, 500 m north of Ziezi Peak, and 2.37 km northeast of Sartorius Point. Overlooking Musala Glacier to the north, and Targovishte Glacier to the southwest. Bulgarian topographic survey Tangra 2004/05. Named after Col. Boris Drangov (1872–1917), a renowned Bulgarian military commander and pedagogue.

== Maps ==
- L.L. Ivanov et al. Antarctica: Livingston Island and Greenwich Island, South Shetland Islands. Scale 1:100000 topographic map. Sofia: Antarctic Place-names Commission of Bulgaria, 2005.
- L.L. Ivanov. Antarctica: Livingston Island and Greenwich, Robert, Snow and Smith Islands. Scale 1:120000 topographic map. Troyan: Manfred Wörner Foundation, 2009. ISBN 978-954-92032-6-4
