= Ziezi =

Bulgar

According to an anonymous Roman Chronographer of 354 CE, Ziezi was a son of Shem and a grandson of Noah. His name is mentioned in the excerpt Ziezi ex quo vulgares meaning "Ziezi, of whom the Bulgars" but being regarded as the first reference to the Bulgars as a people.

== Honour ==
Ziezi Peak on Greenwich Island in the South Shetland Islands, Antarctica is named after Ziezi.
