= Drangovo, Kardzhali Province =

Drangovo Дрангово
- Village
- Location within Bulgaria
- Coordinates: 41.3333°N 25.2500°E
- Country: Bulgaria
- Province: Kardzhali Province
- Municipality: Kirkovo
- Time zone: UTC+2 (EET)
  - Summer (DST): UTC+3 (EEST)

Drangovo is a village in Kirkovo Municipality, Kardzhali Province, southern Bulgaria.

Drangovo has two ancient Roman bridges, one in the center, one at a tributary of Drangovskko river close by. The second was destroyed by treasure hunters in February 2016 illegally digging for legendary gold treasures.
