= Anthony de la Roché =

17th-century English explorer

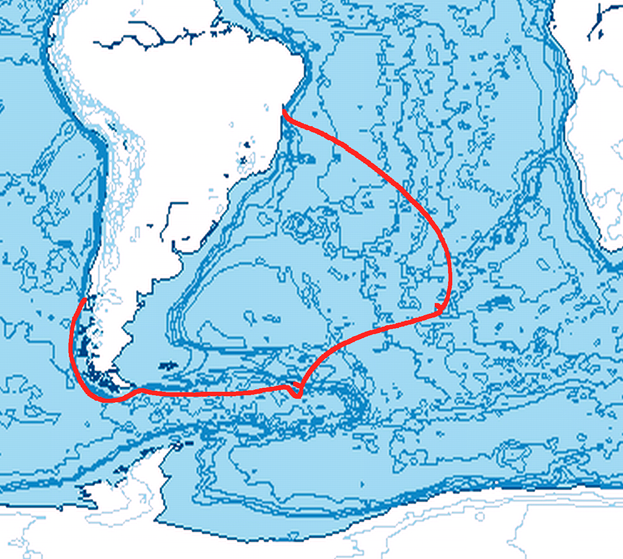
- Route of La Roché's voyage from Chile to Roché Island (South Georgia) and on to Brazil in 1675
- Born: Mid-17th century London, England
- Occupations: Maritime explorer and merchant

Early voyages in the Southern or Antarctic Ocean

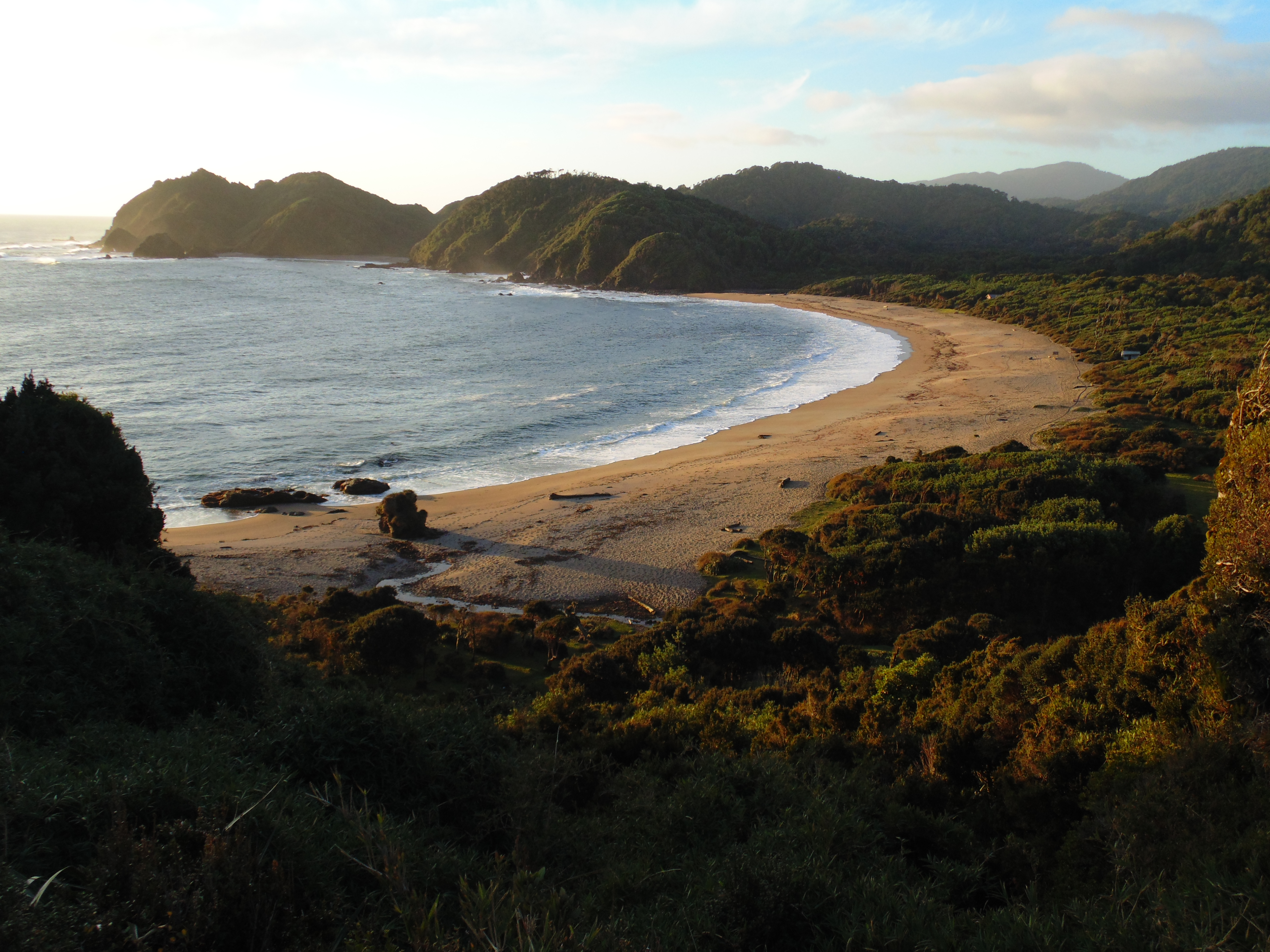
Chiloé Island

Anthony de la Roché (spelled also Antoine de la Roché, Antonio de la Roché or Antonio de la Roca in some sources) was a 17th-century English maritime explorer and merchant, born in London to a French Huguenot father and an English mother, who took part in a joint venture established by English and Dutch shipowners in the Spanish port city of Cádiz in order to engage in the lucrative New World trade. During a commercial voyage between Europe and South America he was blown off course in Drake Passage, visited the island of South Georgia and sighted Clerke Rocks in 1675, thereby making the first discovery of land in the Antarctic. In doing so he crossed the Antarctic Convergence, a natural boundary of the Antarctic region that would be described two and a half centuries later by the British Discovery Investigations and the German Meteor Expedition.

== 1675 voyage ==
=== Discovery of Roché Island (South Georgia) and Clerke Rocks ===
Having acquired a 350-ton ship and a bilander of 50 tons in Hamburg, with 56 men in the two vessels, La Roché obtained permission by the Spanish authorities to trade in Spanish America. He called at the Canary Islands in May 1674, and in October that year arrived in the port of Callao in the Viceroyalty of Peru by way of Le Maire Strait and Cape Horn. On the return voyage, they careened their vessels on the coast of Chiloé Island, Chile and set sail for Baía de Todos os Santos (Salvador), Brazil.

In April 1675 La Roché rounded Cape Horn and was overwhelmed by tempestuous conditions in the treacherous waters off Staten Island. With "the Winds and Currents having carried them so far to the Eastward", he failed to make Le Maire Strait as desired, nor could he round Cape Saint John, the eastern tip of Staten Island "to sail into the No. Sea by Brouwer’s Strait" (no strait actually but rather a seaway by the east of Staten Island discovered during the 1643 circumnavigation of the island by the Dutch expedition to Valdivia under Admiral Hendrik Brouwer).

Eventually, they found refuge in one of South Georgia's southern bays – possibly Drygalski Fjord or Doubtful Bay, according to Matthews and other authors – where the battered ships anchored for a fortnight.

According to La Roché's account of the events reportedly published in French in London in 1678 and its surviving 1690 Spanish précis by the mariner, cosmographer and writer Capt. Francisco de Seixas y Lovera (translated into English by Alexander Dalrymple, the first Hydrographer of the British Admiralty), "they found a Bay, in which they anchored close to a Point or Cape which stretches out to the Southeast with 28. 30. and 40. fathoms sand and rock." The surrounding glaciated, mountainous terrain was described as "some Snow Mountains near the Coast, with much bad Weather."

Once the weather cleared up, they set sail and while rounding the southeast extremity of South Georgia sighted on their starboard Clerke Rocks (Seixas y Lovera's "Southern land"), a group of conspicuous rocky islets extending 11 km in east–west direction and rising to 244 m (James Cook's "Sugar-Loaf Peak") some 60 km to the east-southeast.

=== Fleurieu and Admiralty variant routes ===
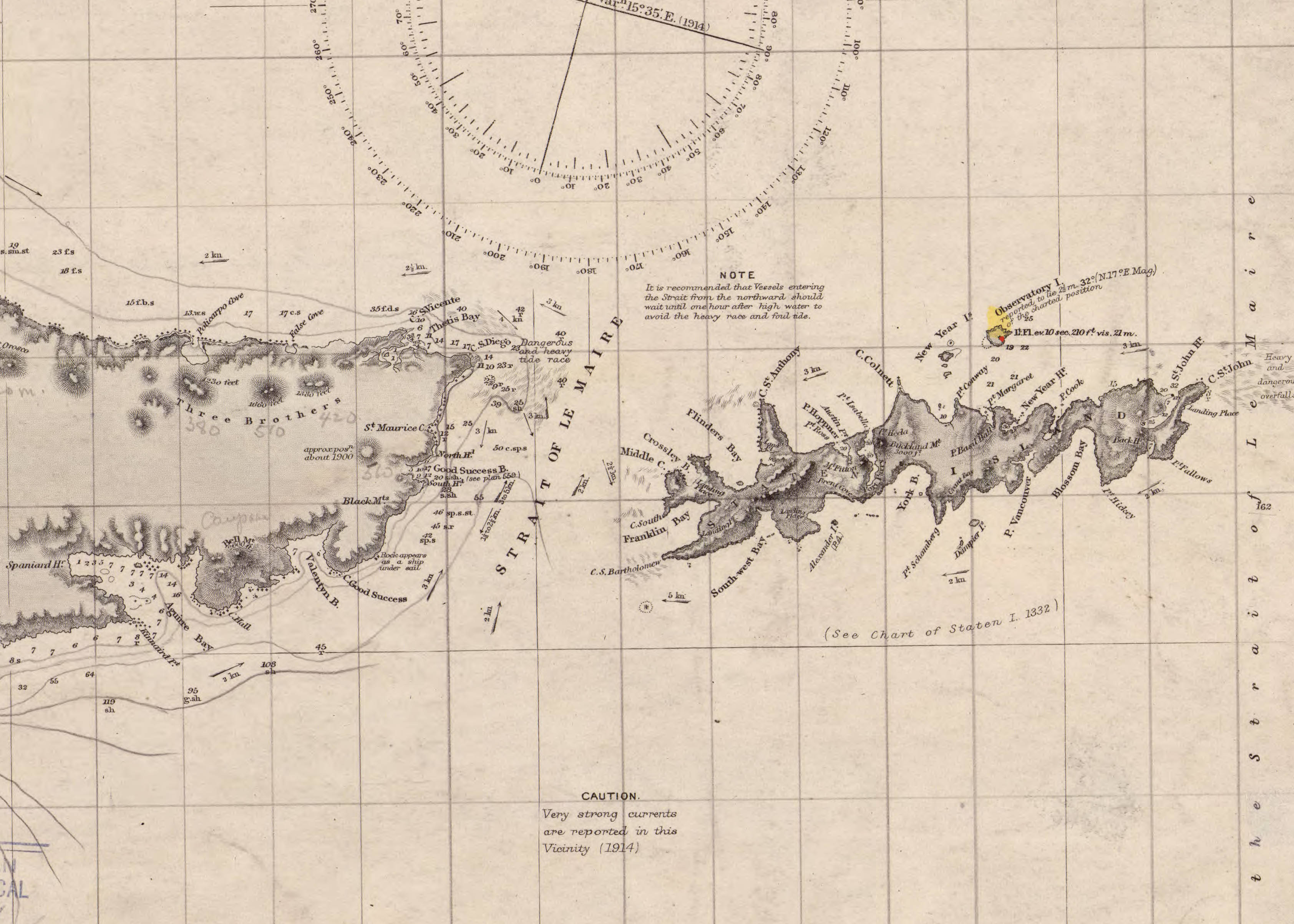
Nautical chart of Le Maire Strait and Isla de los Estados area; caution notes warn of local "very strong currents", "dangerous and heavy tide race" and "heavy race and foul tide"

French naval officer, explorer and hydrographer Charles Pierre Claret de Fleurieu opined that La Roché's strait was actually Stewart Strait running between Willis Islands and Bird Island off the northwestern tip of South Georgia, traversed and mapped by Capt. James Cook in 1775, which however is 3.6 km (less than one league) wide, with no point or cape stretching out to the southeast.

For quite some time in the 20th century, the even narrower (550 m wide) nearby passage separating Bird Island from the main island of South Georgia used to appear as La Roché Strait, La-Roche-Straße or Estrecho La Roche on Admiralty charts and in other publications. This version was eventually discarded due to its discord with the existing historical description, and the passage got renamed to Bird Sound.

Likewise, the navigable Cooper Sound separating Cooper Island from mainland South Georgia is way too narrow (exactly one kilometre wide) to qualify as a possible La Roché Strait.

=== Burney, Fitte and Destéfani variant routes ===
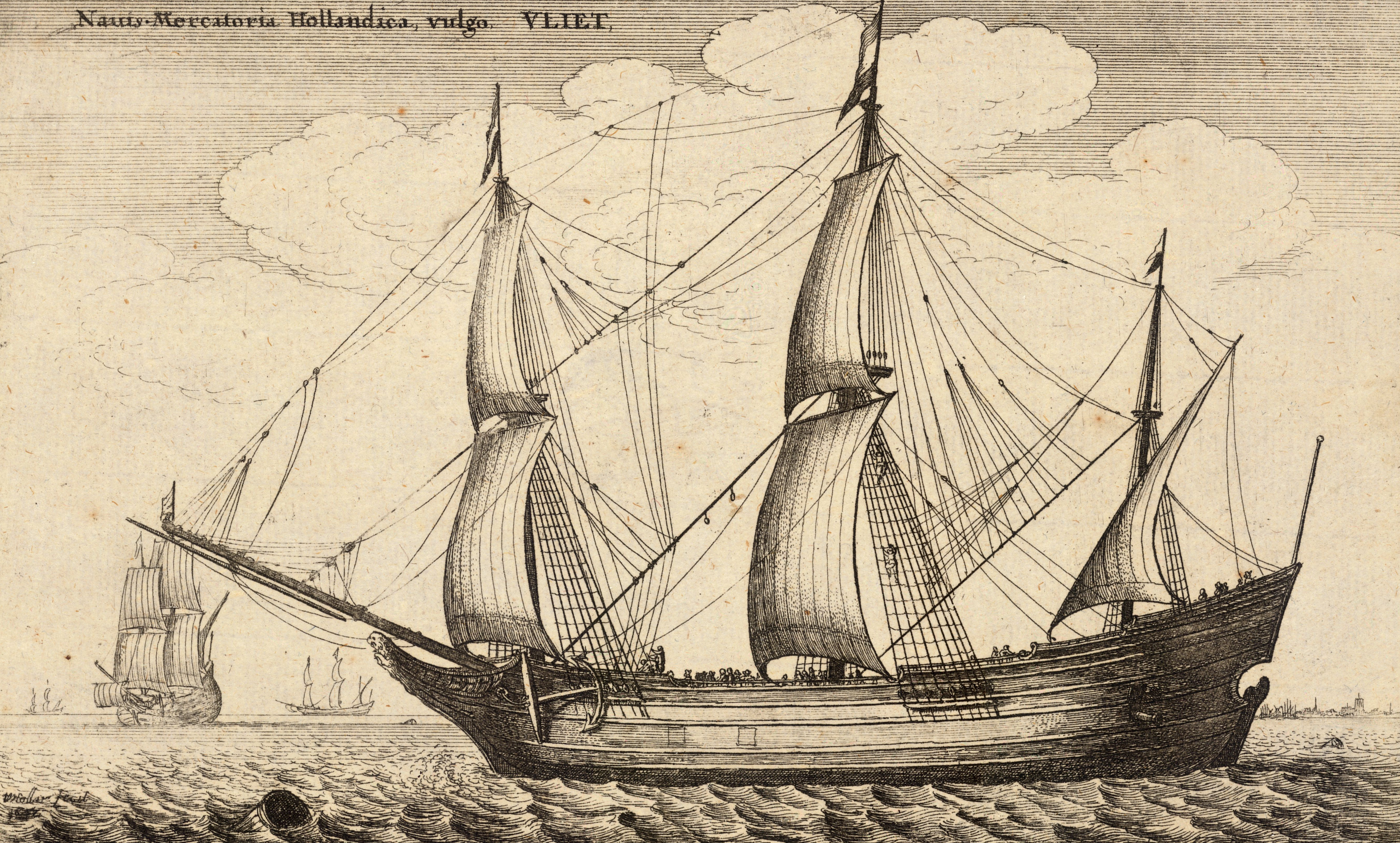
17th-century merchantman

Royal Navy officer and author James Burney conjectured that La Roché might have visited not South Georgia but the Falkland Islands instead (known at that time as John Davis's South Land or Sebald Islands, not yet Malouines, Falklands or Malvinas), possibly anchored in the Bay of Harbours or Eagle Passage area, and upon his departure sailed east with the flat, boggy Lafonia Peninsula on his port and Beauchene Island on his starboard.

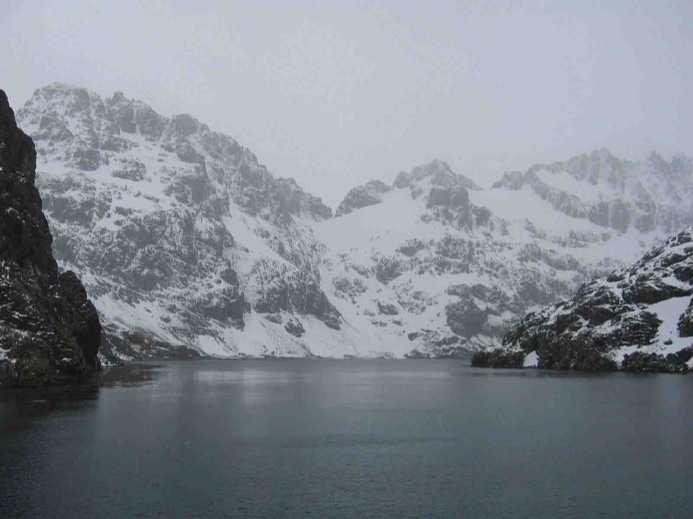
Drygalski Fjord, a possible place of La Roché's stay in South Georgia

In a variant Falklands version, Argentine historian Ernesto Fitte identified La Roché Strait with the Falkland Sound separating the two main islands of the Falklands archipelago. That passage, however, is some 90 km long – no way of disemboguing through it "in 3 Glasses" – and narrowing to less than 5 km rather than "10 leagues little more or less."

Argentine naval officer and historian Laurio Destéfani referred to the possibility of Roché Island actually being Beauchene Island itself. Yet there is no land to the southeast of Beauchene, whether within visibility range or further beyond, hence no "said Passage." Furthermore, with its elevation of 70 m that island could hardly be one of the two "high lands" in Seixas y Lovera's summary.

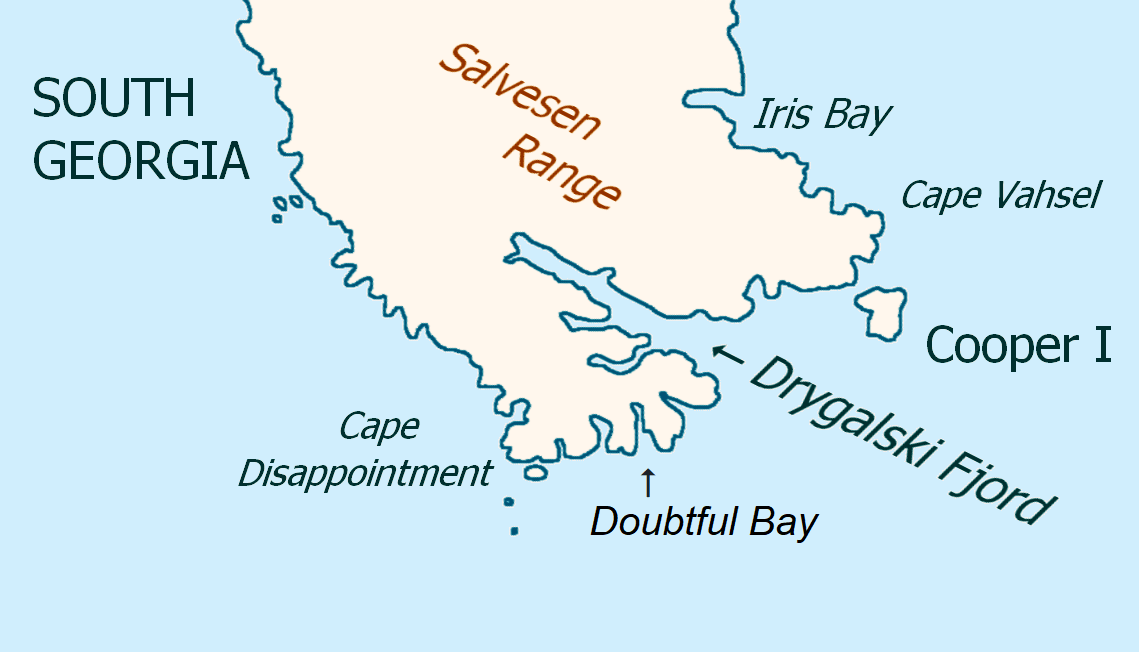
Location of Drygalski Fjord and Doubtful Bay

One common drawback of Burney's conjecture and its varieties is that the Falkland Islands are not known for their "snow mountains near the coast."

Another drawback would stem from La Roché's approaching his island from the west ("the Land which they now began to see toward the East"). Indeed, in such a westerly location with respect to the Falklands he would have already been in the "North Sea", even before his two-week anchorage and before sailing his strait – something refuted by the report narrating that, on departure, "steering ENE they found themselves in the No. Sea."

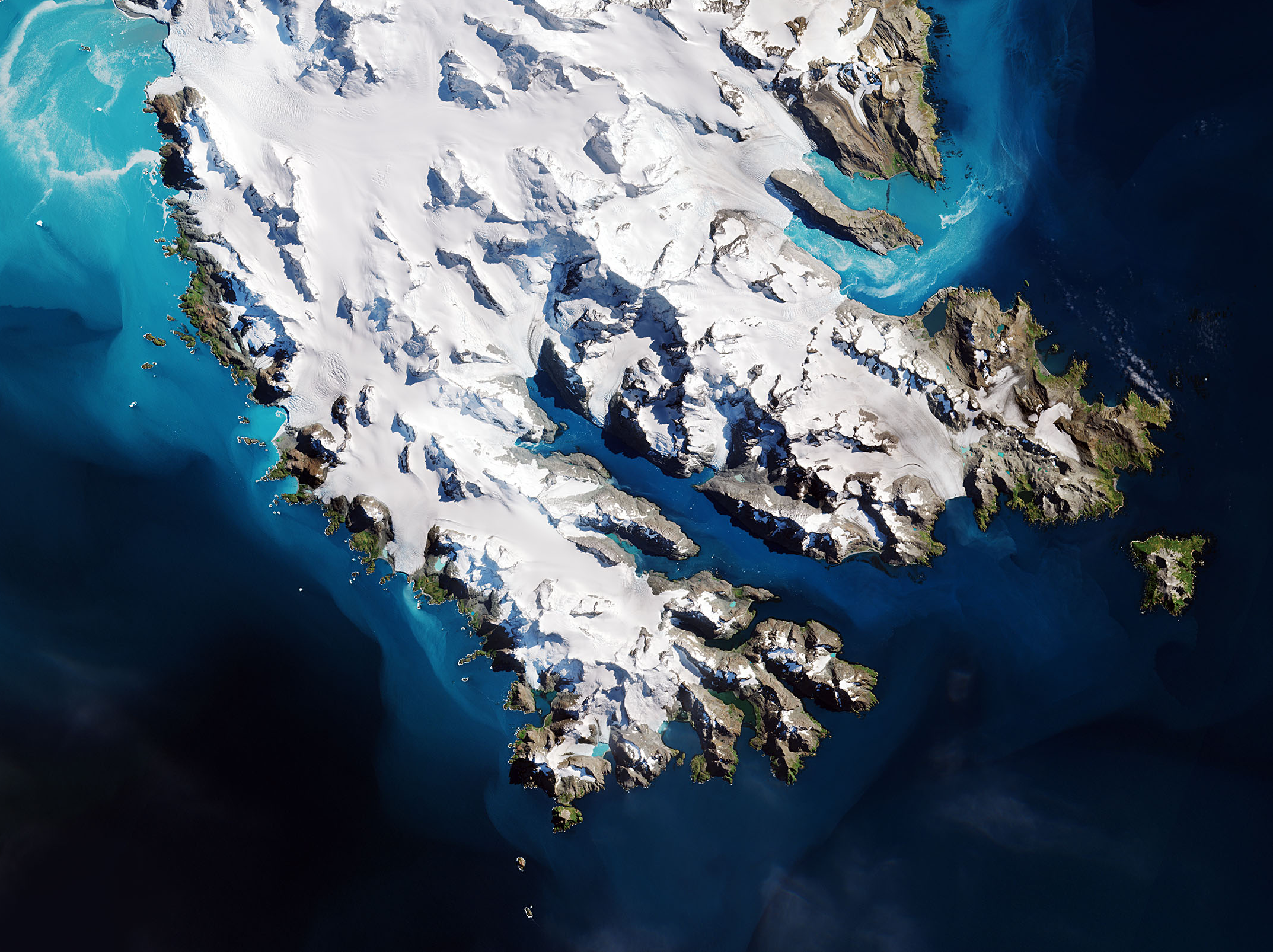
Satellite image of the southeast end of South Georgia

(According to American historian Mark Peterson, "maps from the sixteenth and seventeenth centuries commonly referred to the entire Atlantic as the North Sea ... even the southernmost regions of the Atlantic, the waters to the east of Argentina and Tierra del Fuego ...")

That a sailing ship in Drake Passage could be blown off course and find itself near South Georgia was demonstrated by the Spanish merchant ship León captained by Gregorio Jerez on a voyage in service of the French company Sieur Duclos of Saint-Malo, which ship made the second sighting of the island in June 1756. On that particular occasion, the Board of Expert Pilots in Cádiz examined the ship pilot Henri Cormer's report and concluded that the island was probably that sighted by Antoine de la Roche in 1675.

=== Varnhagen-Duperrey hypothesis ===
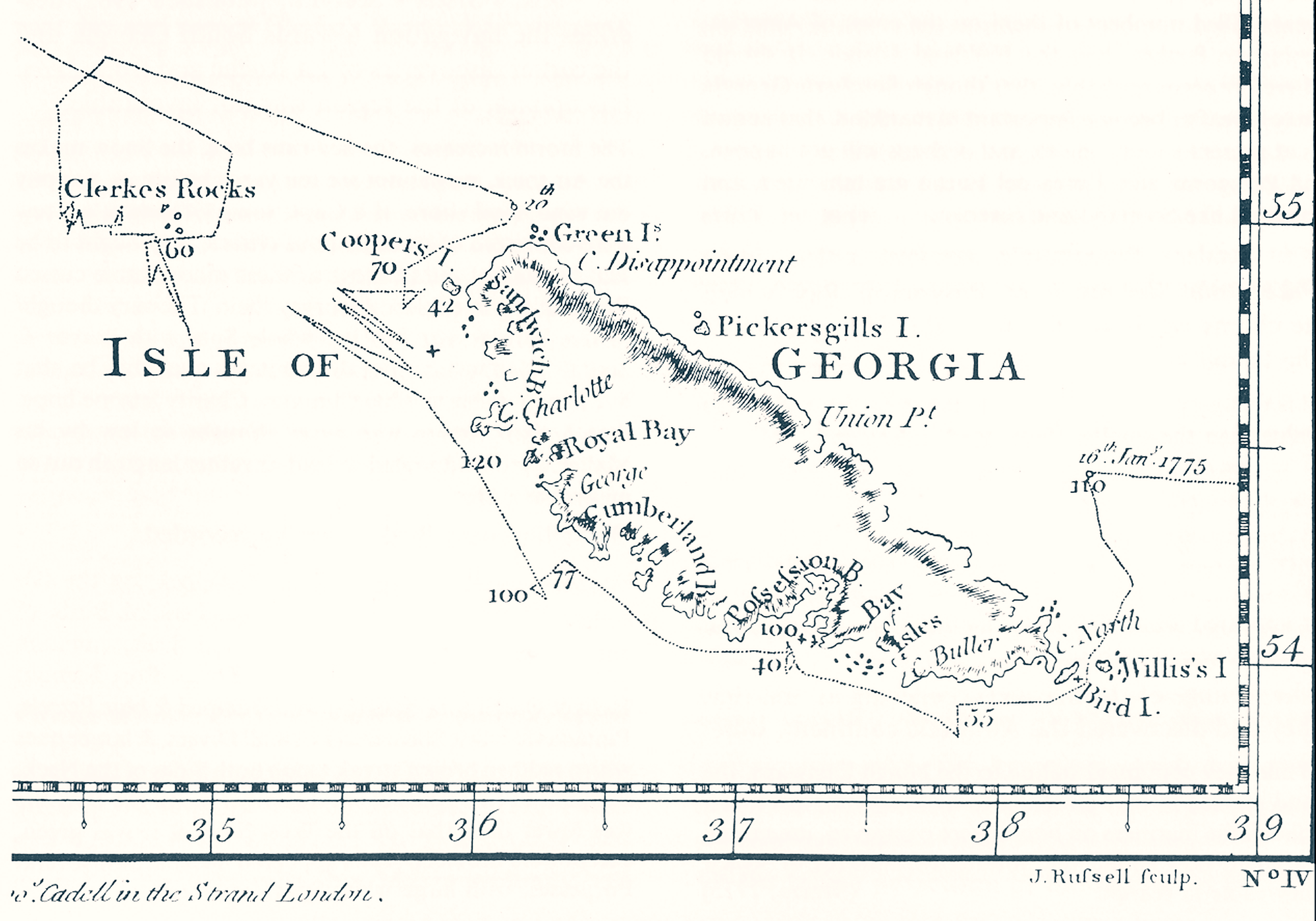
A 1777 south-up chart by Capt. James Cook, according to which La Roché's strait running between Cooper Island, South Georgia and Clerke Rocks is 67 km wide (being equal to 36 minutes of latitude), and centred at 54°55′S 35°20′W, while South Georgia itself extends from 53°57'S to 54°57'S latitude and 36°W to 38°15'W longitude

Brazilian historian Francisco Adolfo de Varnhagen, in following French naval officer and explorer Louis-Isidore Duperrey, supposed that South Georgia might have been discovered as early as April 1502 by a Portuguese expedition led by Gonçalo Coelho, finding evidence of this in an episode reported by Florentine Amerigo Vespucci. According to the latter's account, from Brazil the expedition headed south and reached 52°S latitude, from where, after a four-day voyage in turbulent weather they made a landfall and sailed "about 20 leagues" along a rocky coast in severe cold weather.

Vespucci made no mention of snow/ice cover, something with which South Georgia invariably impresses seafarers. For instance, Cook described Possession Bay, South Georgia like this: "The head of the bay, as well as two places on each side, was terminated by perpendicular ice-cliffs of considerable height. Pieces were continually breaking off, and floating out to sea; and a great fall happened while we were in the bay, which made a noise like cannon ... and the valleys lay covered with everlasting snow." The island rises to an elevation of 2934 m and has been described like "the Alps in mid-ocean" or "the Himalayas seen from Simla."

Map of Lafonia, Beauchene Island and Falkland Sound in the Falkland Islands

Vespucci wrote, however, that the night there lasted fifteen hours, which on the date in question (7 April, 17 April New Style) was valid 2,000 km south of 52°S – a location unattainable in four days. Indeed, the estimated top speed of a ship like Coelho's caravel used to be 8 knots or 356 km per day.

Coelho's voyage was commissioned by King Manuel I of Portugal and duly documented in the Portuguese archives which, however, have no reports of venturing that far south, and indeed no information sourced to Vespucci.

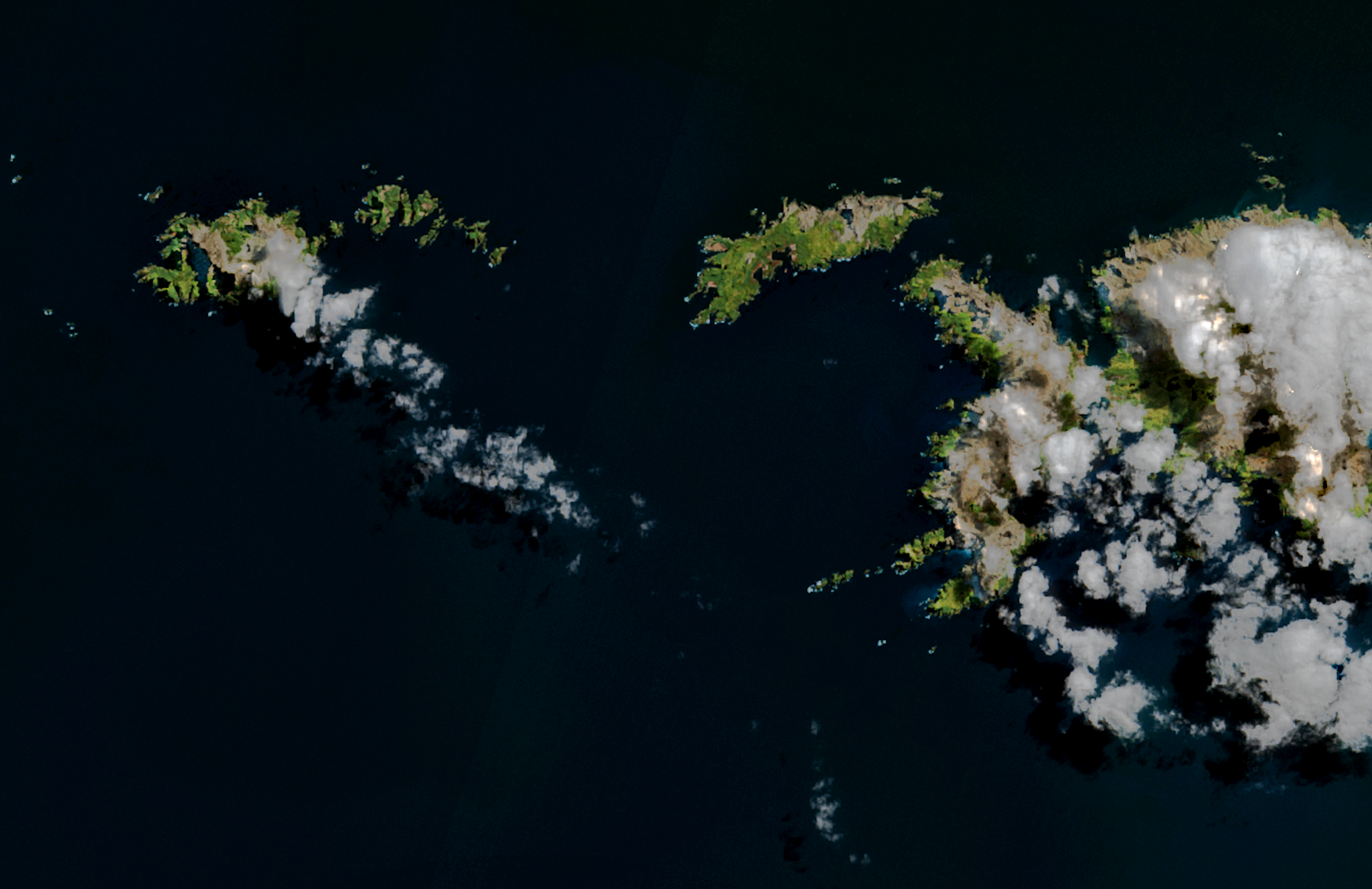
Satellite image of (left to right) Willis Islands, Stewart Strait, Bird Island and Bird Sound off the northwestern tip of South Georgia

In comparison, Seixas y Lovera's work Descripcion Geographica y Derrotero de la Region Austral Magallanica (for which there is evidence of governmental aid for its printing costs) was duly licensed, endorsed and officially reported to Charles II of Spain in his Royal and Supreme Council of the Indies in 1690, with its publication and translation into French making the reported European and Spanish American developments related to La Roché's voyage open to wider scrutiny. The 1690 Spanish map of the Strait of Magellan and Tierra del Fuego area was officially presented before the Council in 1692, while Seixas y Lovera's 1688 book Theatro Naval Hydrographico extensively referring to Roché Passage had three Spanish editions and a French one.

Alexander von Humboldt respectfully disagreed with Duperrey, and thought that Vespucci must have been driven back by a storm and seen part of the east Patagonian coast. According to British historians Eric Christie and Robert Headland, the analysis of historical evidence refutes the Varnhagen-Duperrey hypothesis.

=== Isle Grande (Gough Island) landing and Cook's mapping error ===
Isle Grande as placed due north of South Georgia on this 1777 chart of the southern hemisphere by Capt. James Cook; Gough Island appears as Diego Alvares

Several days after his departure from South Georgia, La Roché came across another uninhabited island, "where they found water, wood and fish" and spent six days "without seeing any human being", thus making what some historians believe was the first landing on the South Atlantic island that had been discovered by the Portuguese navigator Gonçalo Álvares in 1505, called Gonçalo Álvares Island (sometimes erringly Diego Álvarez or Diego Alvares), and better known as Gough Island since 1732.

Following La Roché's voyage, a sizeable island named Isle Grande, Isla Grande or Isle Grand was placed on the map mostly northeast of Roché Island (like on the 1703 map by Guillaume Delisle, 1710 map by Nicolaes Visscher or 1715 map by Herman Moll referred to below) and west-southwest of Gough Island, with near five degrees of latitude discrepancy between them.

However, when Roché Island was relocated on the map eastwards to its more precise longitude ascertained by James Cook in 1775 (using a Kendall copy of Harrison's marine chronometer), the cartographers would seem to have overlooked the necessity to adjust the location of Isle Grande accordingly. Apparently, the error of placing Isle Grande due north rather than northeast of South Georgia was originally committed by Cook himself in his 1777 chart of the southern hemisphere, and widely upheld by others because of his impeccable cartographic authoritativeness.

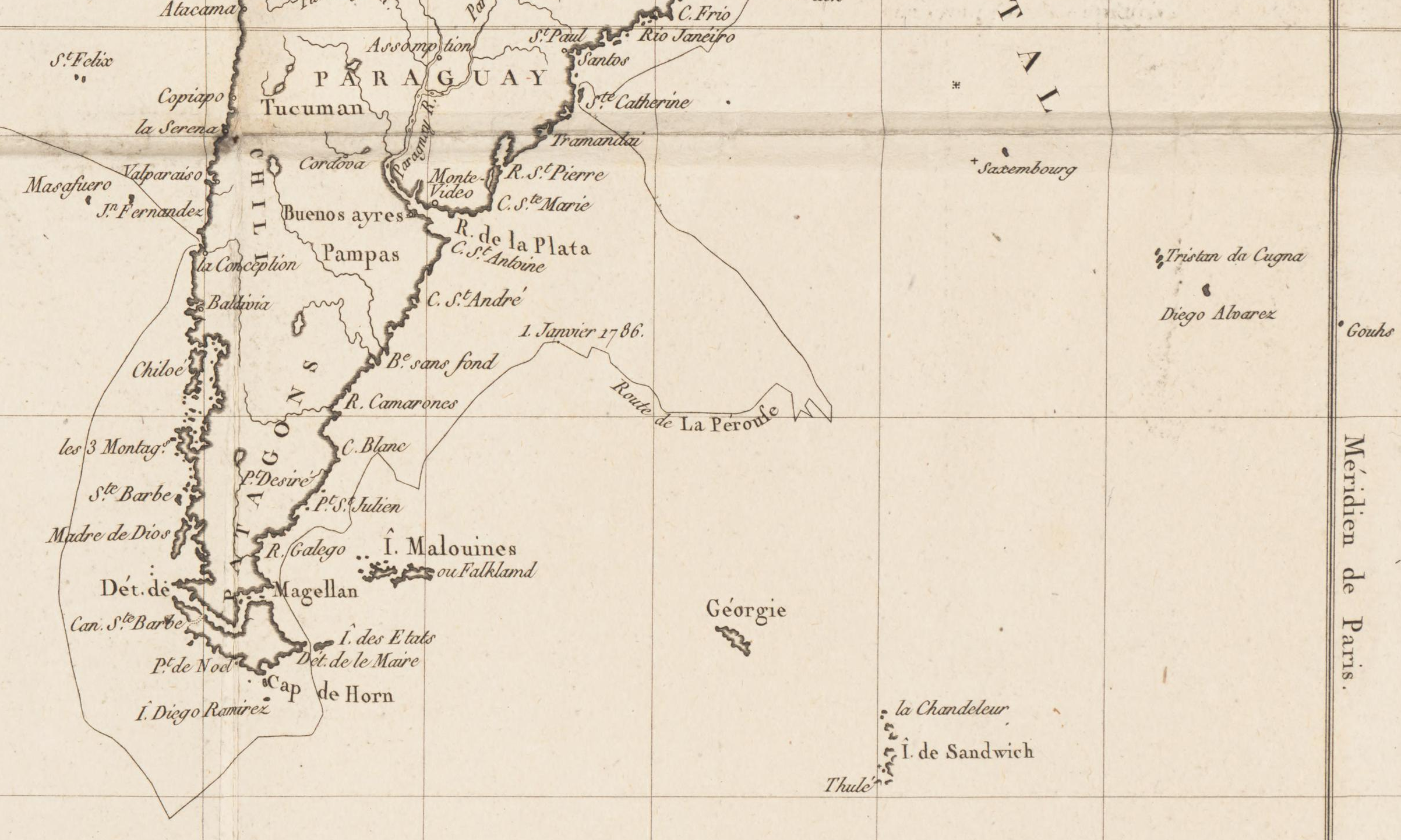
Capt. Jean-François de Galaup de Lapérouse's detour in 1785 to search for Isle Grande in an area situated due north of South Georgia and west-southwest of Gough Island, with the latter shown on the chart as Diego Alvarez. The mythical Saxembourg Island is shown near the top of the map, to the north-west of Tristan da Cunha.

As a result of that Lapérouse, Vancouver, Colnett, von Bellingshausen and other mariners sought in vain to find Isle Grande as mapped north of South Georgia (like on the 1784 chart by Henry Roberts, 1790 map by de:Johann Walch, 1794 map by Aaron Arrowsmith, 1794 map by John Russell, 1796 map by Mathew Carey, 1804 map by Jedidiah Morse or 1810–20 map by fr:Jean-Baptiste Poirson referred to below) instead of northeast of it. For instance, on his way to the Pacific via Le Maire Strait and Cape Horn, Capt. Lapérouse made in November–December 1785 a forty-day detour from the Brazilian island of Santa Catarina to an area north of South Georgia in fruitless search of Isle Grande.

On his way to rounding Cape Saint John and Cape Horn, Colnett wrote in April 1793: "In this course I ran directly over the situations in which the Isle of Grand is placed in all the charts, without discovering any appearance of land" ... "I am disposed to believe, that the Isle of Grand also exists, and that my not being able to find it, arose from an error in copying the Latitude given by La Roche ... I might, on my return, search for it in the Latitudes of 40° and 41°, having strong reason to believe, that there is land in or near those Latitudes, but to the Eastward of the Longitude which I crossed; as otherwise, I am at a loss to account for such a quantity of birch twigs, sea-weed, drift-wood and birds as were seen in that situation."

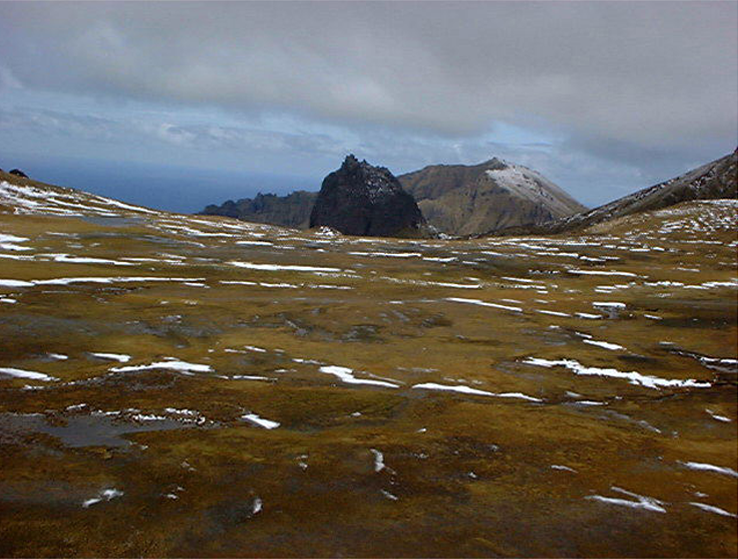
Gonçalo Álvares (Gough) Island

Colnett had been instructed by the Board of Admiralty to look for Isle Grande as the first objective in his 1793–1794 exploratory voyage but, although his reckoned latitude was correct (Gough is actually centred at 40°19'S), he missed the opportunity to find the island: "... we crossed near the supposed situation of the Isle Grande. At this time my vessel was almost a wreck, very short of provisions, and what remained in a very bad state, to which may be added an hurricane of wind and the winter season: circumstances that, I trust, will be a sufficient excuse for my not renewing my search of it as I had intended."

In his attempted reconstruction of the 1675 events Burney found a possible place of landing as far west as the coast of Patagonia, at the projecting headlands of either Cabo Dos Bahías or Punta Santa Elena (south and north entrance to Camarones Bay respectively). Each of these, it was said, "afar off appears like an island." However, for La Roché and his companions it was no afar off appearance as they approached, landed, and spent time ashore.

Royal Navy officer and prolific author Rupert Gould endorsed Burney's Patagonian conjecture but not his Falklands one, and regarded La Roché as either discoverer or rediscoverer of South Georgia.

Resuming his voyage from Isle Grande, La Roché successfully reached the Brazilian port of Salvador as intended, and eventually arrived in La Rochelle, France on 29 September 1675.

== Legacy ==
=== Maritime navigation and exploration ===
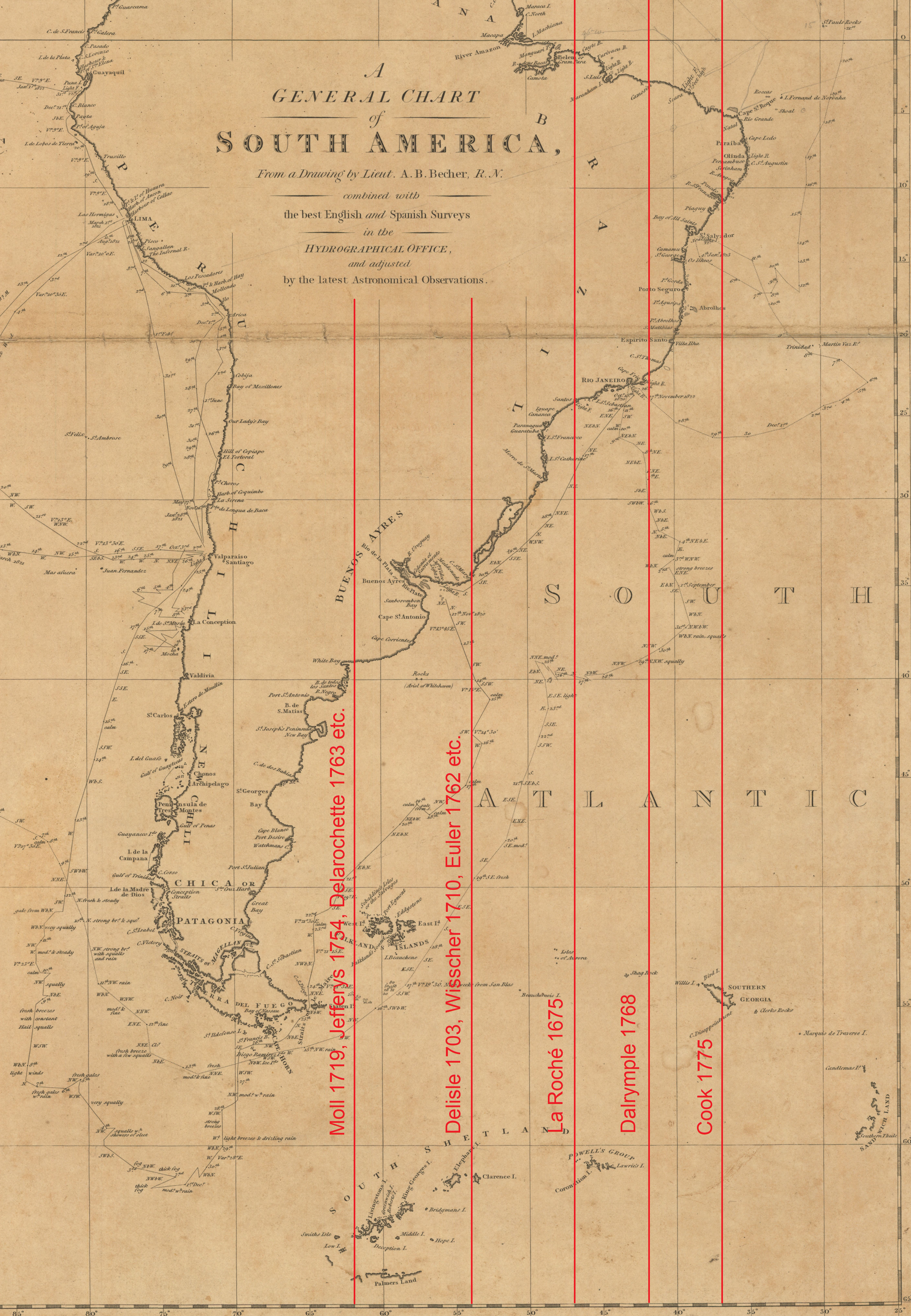
Early reckonings of the geographical longitude of Roché Island (South Georgia)

La Roché's discovery of South Georgia was preceded by that of several uninhabited island territories situated close north of the Convergence, notably Auckland Islands discovered by Polynesians, Gough Island and Prince Edward Islands by Europeans, and Staten Island (Isla de los Estados), Diego Ramírez Islands and Falkland Islands by Europeans with evidence attesting to early visits by indigenous Fuegians.

Following the 1675 voyage cartographers started to depict on their maps Roché Island or Land of la Roché, Terre de la Roché, with Strait(s) de la Roché separating it from an Unknown Land, with these features situated to the eastward of Tierra del Fuego, as well as Isle Grande (occasionally Ile de la Roché, la Roche’s Island or Isla de la Roca) – that "very great and nice island" in the middle of South Atlantic Ocean.

La Roché reckoned that his island was situated 18° of longitude east of Le Maire Strait, which would place it on the meridian 47°W running across the Brazilian city of São Paulo, 10° of longitude west of the central meridian 37°W of South Georgia; the latter being about the same as the central meridian of the northeastern Brazilian state of Alagoas. The 1768 chart by Dalrymple and Thomas Jefferys shows Roché Island as situated on the meridian of Cabo Frio, Brazil, some 5° of longitude west of the central meridian of South Georgia.

For no good reason, Roché Island is found further west on a number of old maps, roughly on the meridian 54°W of es:Cabo de Santa María, Uruguay (like on the 1703 map by Guillaume Delisle, the 1710 map by Nicolaes Visscher or the 1762 map by Leonhard Euler referred to below), or still further west, roughly on the meridian 62°W of the Patagonian bay of es:Anegada (like on the 1719 map by Herman Moll, the 1754 map by Jefferys or the ca. 1763 map by Louis Delarochette referred to below).

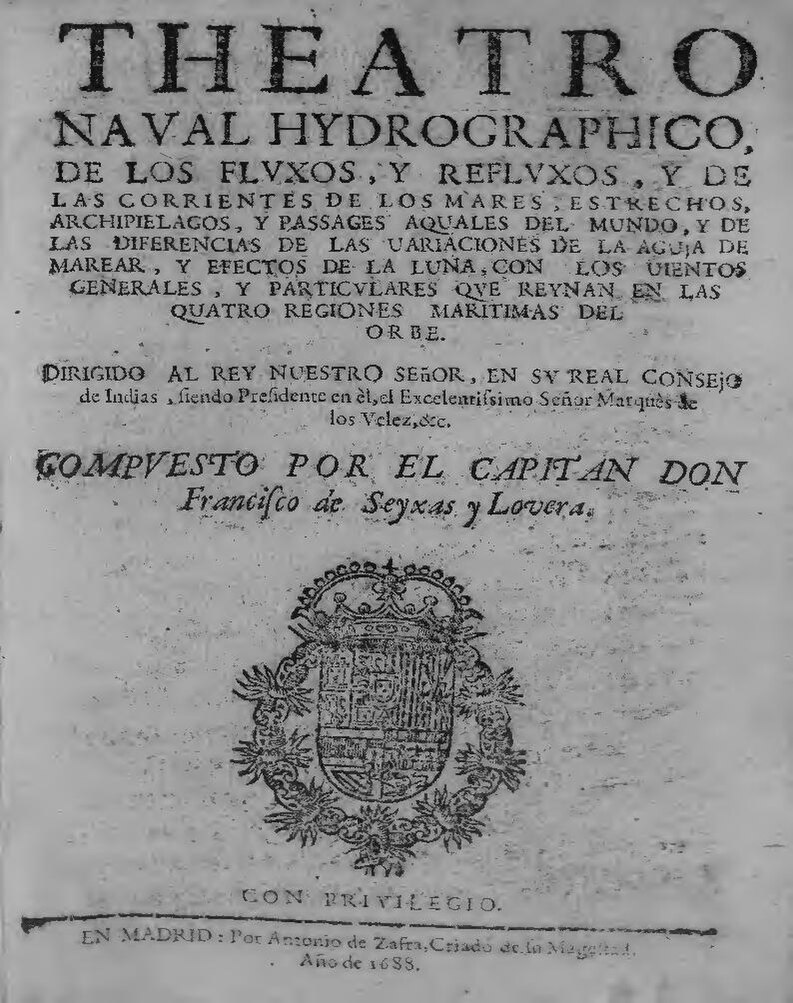
Title page of the 1688 book Theatro Naval Hydrographico etc. by Capt. Francisco de Seixas y Lovera (aka Seyxas y Lovera or Seijas y Lobera)

Based on La Roché's data however, old cartographers rendered geographical latitude rather more uniformly by placing the island at 55°S on their maps.

Well aware of La Roché's discovery, James Cook mentioned it in his ship's logbook upon approaching South Georgia one hundred years later in January 1775, and later wrote in the general introduction to his 1777 book: "In April 1675, Anthony la Roche, an English merchant, in his return from the South Pacific Ocean, where he had been on a trading voyage, being carried, by the winds and currents, far to the East of Strait La Maire, fell in with a coast, which may possibly be the same with that which I visited during this voyage, and have called the Island of Georgia."

Cook made the first recorded landing, surveyed and mapped Roché Island, and renamed and claimed it for King George III of Great Britain and Ireland. (Fleurieu disapproved of the name change disrespecting early discovery, and recommended that the island "should not be called New Georgia." Cook was more considerate in the case of Kerguelen though, an island that he visited in 1776 and noted: "which, from its sterility, I should, with great propriety, call the Island of Desolation, but that I would not rob Monsieur de Kerguelen of the honour of its bearing his name.")

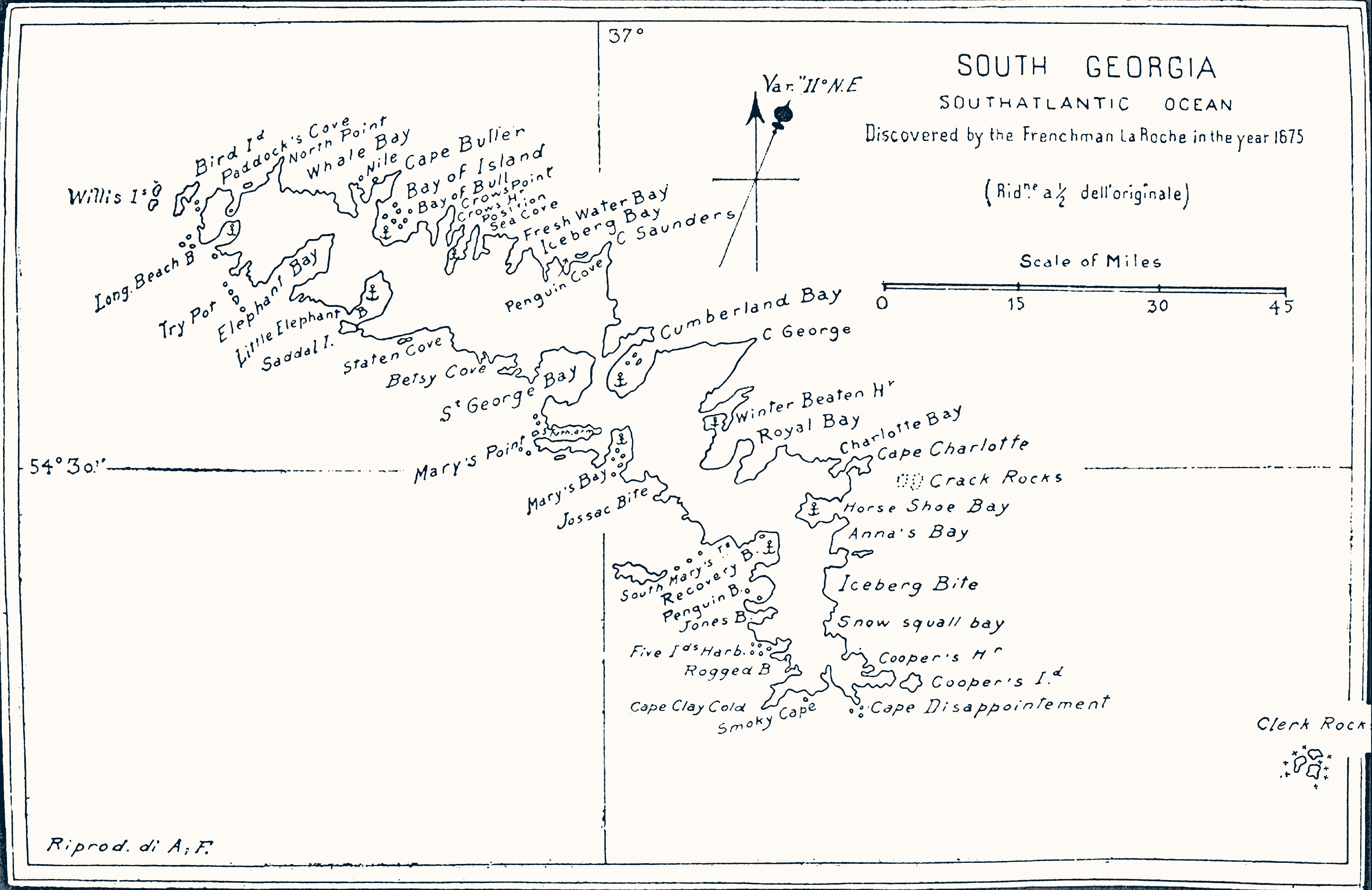
1802 Map of South Georgia and Clerke Rocks by Capt. Isaac Pendleton

German naturalist Georg Forster, scientist in Cook's expedition, also knew of La Roché's discovery. So did naval officer and explorer James Colnett, then a midshipman in the expedition who later wrote of "the land discovered by Monsieur La Roche, in Latitude 55° South, which I touched at with Captain Cook ..." (Along with Colnett, Vancouver, Burney and Roberts had also served under Cook on his 1772–1775 voyage.)

Comments and analysis of La Roché's discoveries could be found in the ship's journals of notable explorers such as Britain's Cook, Vancouver and Colnett, France's Lapérouse and Russia's von Bellingshausen, also in Dalrymple's Memoir of a chart of the Southern Ocean, The Nautical Magazine for 1835 and multiple editions of the authoritative Laurie’s Sailing Directory by John Purdy and by Alexander Findlay.

The second-ever map of South Georgia and Clerke Rocks, made in 1802 by Capt. Isaac Pendleton of the American sealing vessel Union and reproduced by the Italian polar cartographer Arnaldo Faustini in 1906, was entitled South Georgia: Discovered by the Frenchman La Roche in the year 1675. While Pendleton probably erred regarding La Roché's nationality due to his French last name, British historian Peter Bradley noted: "Despite the suggestion that La Roché was English, the name and the return to La Rochelle ... appear to indicate a French connection."

Some authors maintain that La Roché was a Spaniard ("... a century before, the Spaniard Antonio de la Roca had discovered Georgia ...;" "... the Spanish navigator Antonio de la Roca discovered the South Georgia Islands ...") yet provide no supporting evidence.

La Roché was quoted in relation to his compass variation data, too.

=== Sovereignty implications and context ===
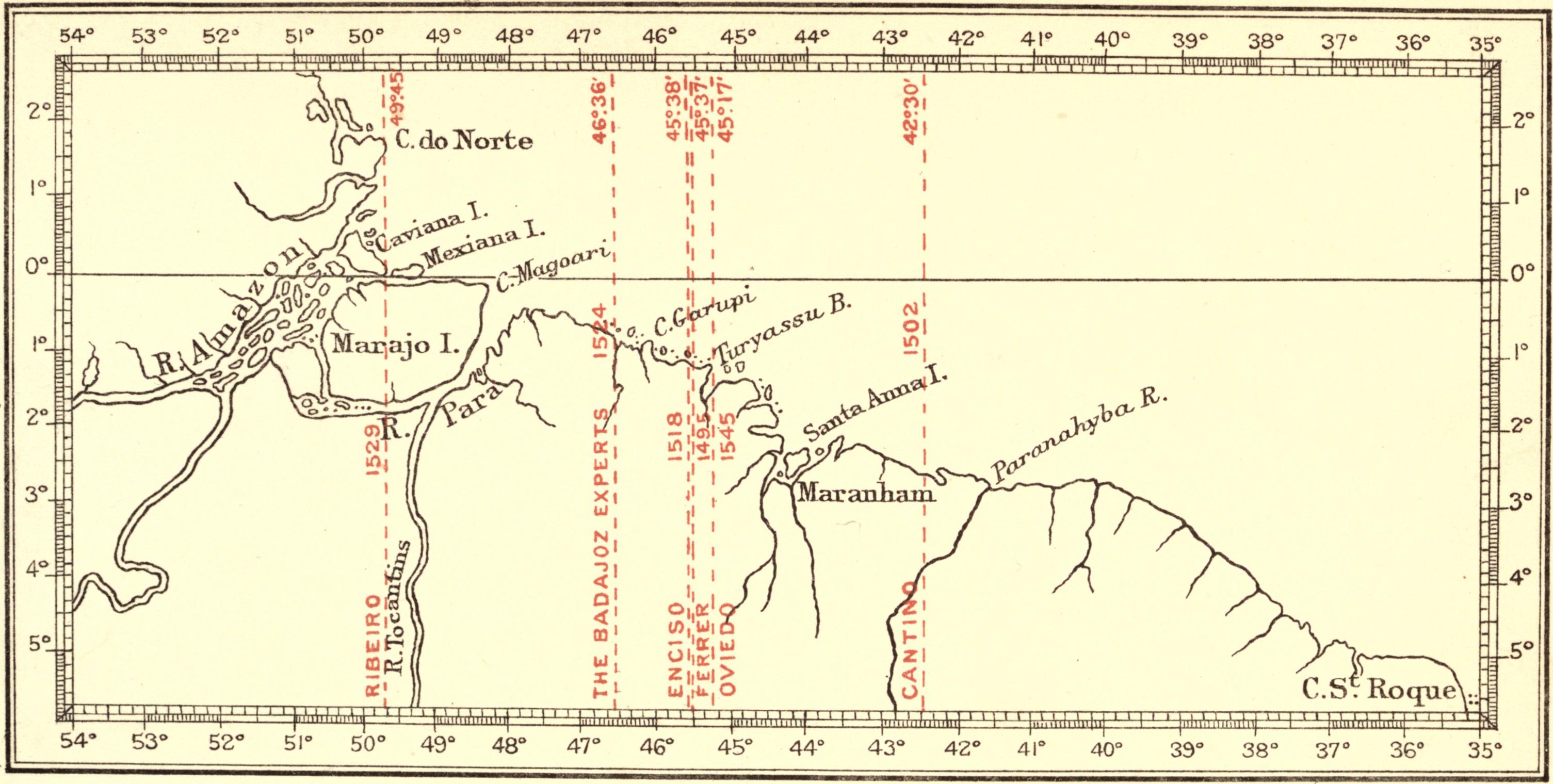
Various reckonings of the Tordesillas line according to Henry Harrisse, all of them running west of the meridian 42°20'W and thus west of South Georgia and Gough, potentially leaving both islands to Portugal

Both the discovery of Roché Island (South Georgia) and the landing on Isle Grande (Gough Island) in 1675 had little if any sovereignty implications, as the islands were not even claimed on that occasion.

A sort of antecedent in that respect might have been the territorial delimitation provisions of the Treaty of Tordesillas concluded in 1454 between Portugal and Spain which, if applied, would have left both islands to the former. Portugal, however, never claimed the islands. Neither did Spain, while major European powers of that time like France, England and a newly independent Netherlands denied any wider validity to the inter-Iberian agreement anyway. As King Francis I of France is quoted to have remarked about the Tordesillas Treaty, "I should like to see the clause in Adam's will that cuts me out of my share in the New World."

Claiming would have to wait until 1775 for South Georgia and 1938 for Gough, in both cases by Britain.

Another attempt at introducing some bilateral legal arrangements for southernmost South America (roughly Patagonia and Tierra del Fuego) was the 1790 Nootka Sound Convention concluded by Britain and Spain, establishing a sort of regime that granted to the subjects of the two kingdoms equal exclusive rights over the local marine living resources, notably seals, whales and fish; and last but not least, kept third countries out. (The restriction to erect only huts and other temporary structures connected to fishery "shall remain in force only so long as no establishment shall have been formed by the subjects of any other power.")

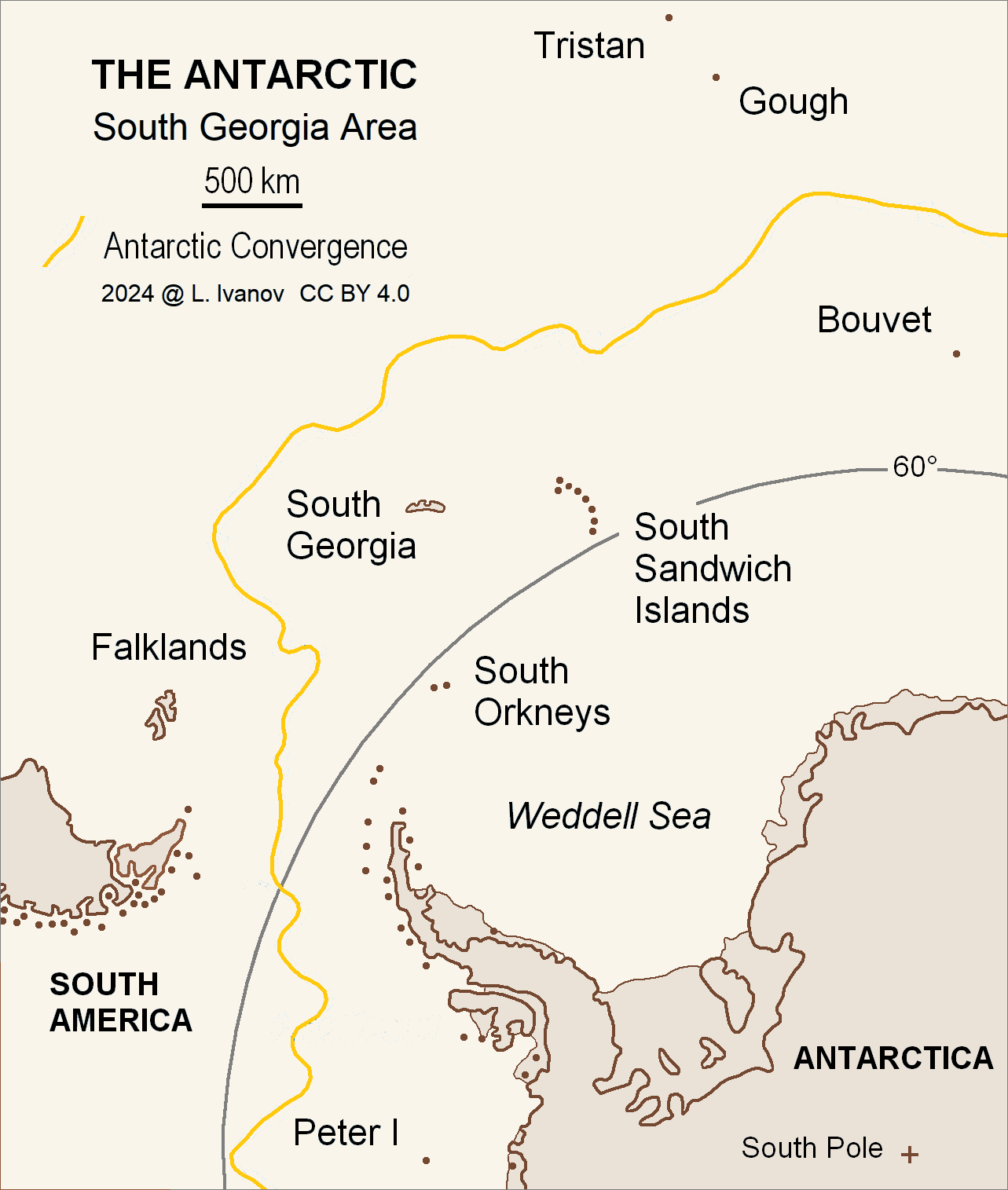
The South Georgia sector of the Antarctic

Seixas y Lovera insisted in his publications that Spain should effectively control both Strait of Magellan and Cape Horn routes to the Pacific coast of Spanish America and to Spanish East Indies, stressing also the strategic value of the pertaining Le Maire, Brouwer and La Roché seaways. Already in 1584 the Spanish expedition of Pedro Sarmiento de Gamboa founded two fortified settlements in the Strait of Magellan, albeit short-lived ones. The Dutch and the French had their own strategic interests in the region and tried to establish effective occupation over certain territories in Chile and the Falklands respectively.

In his remarks on the navigation round Cape Horn, Colnett advised for his country to make use of the Nootka Convention and take possession of Staten Island: "Staten Land is well situated as a place of rendezvous both for men of war and merchant ships ... the North side offers the best place for an establishment, if it should ever be in the view of our government to form one there ... If the navigation round Cape Horn should ever become common, such a place we must possess; and agreeable to the last convention with Spain, we are entitled to keep possession of it, and apply it to any purpose of peace or war." By his personal experience, living conditions there were deemed "far preferable to many stations in Norway." As it happened, Britain took over the Falkland Islands instead.

=== Maps and charts ===
1703 map of southern South America by Guillaume Delisle featuring Roché Island, Strait de la Roché, Unknown Land and Isle Grande, along with the ship tracks of Coelho / Vespucci, Magellan, Sarmiento de Gamboa, La Roché, Sharp and Halley

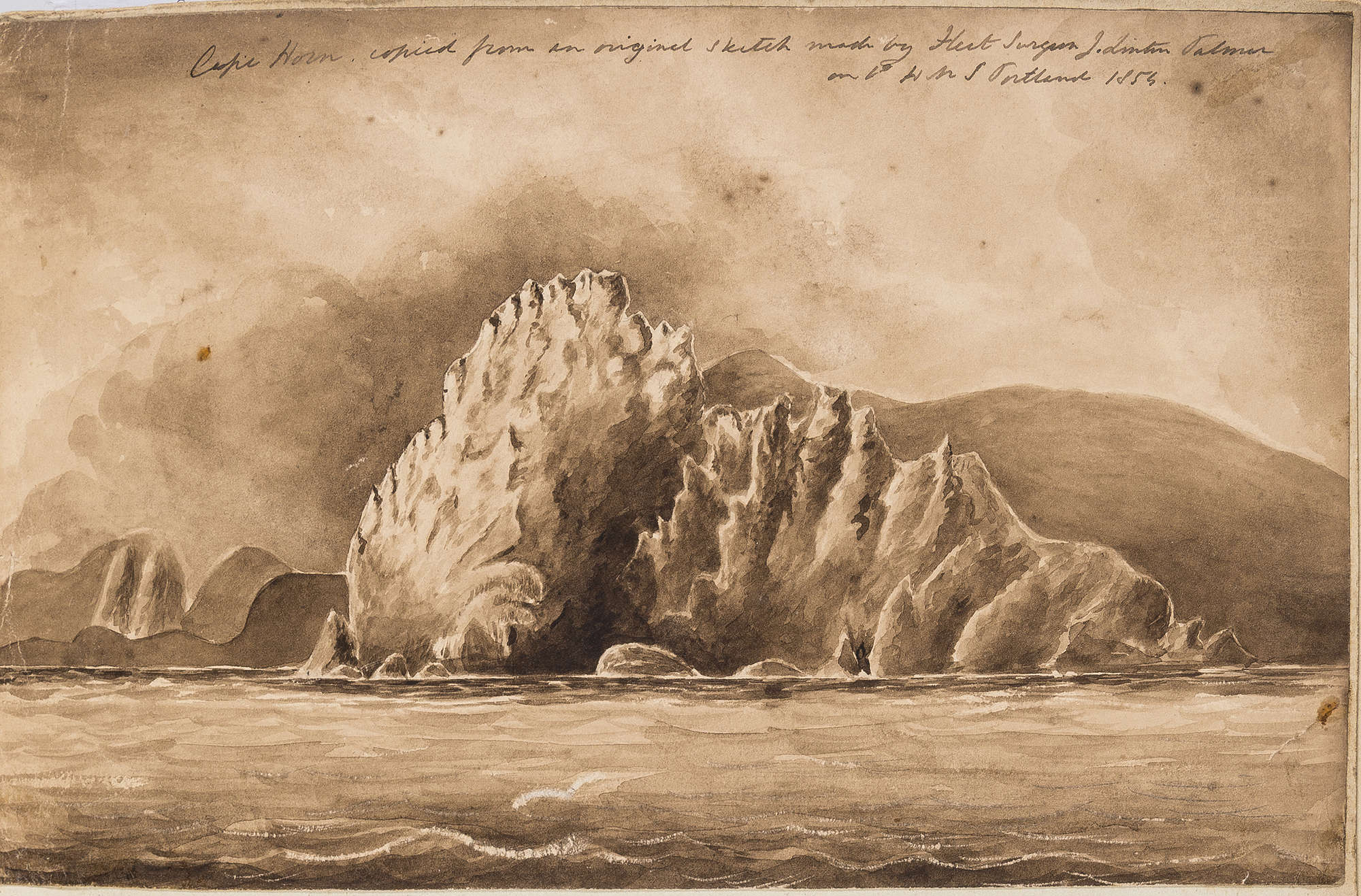
Sketch of Cape Horn

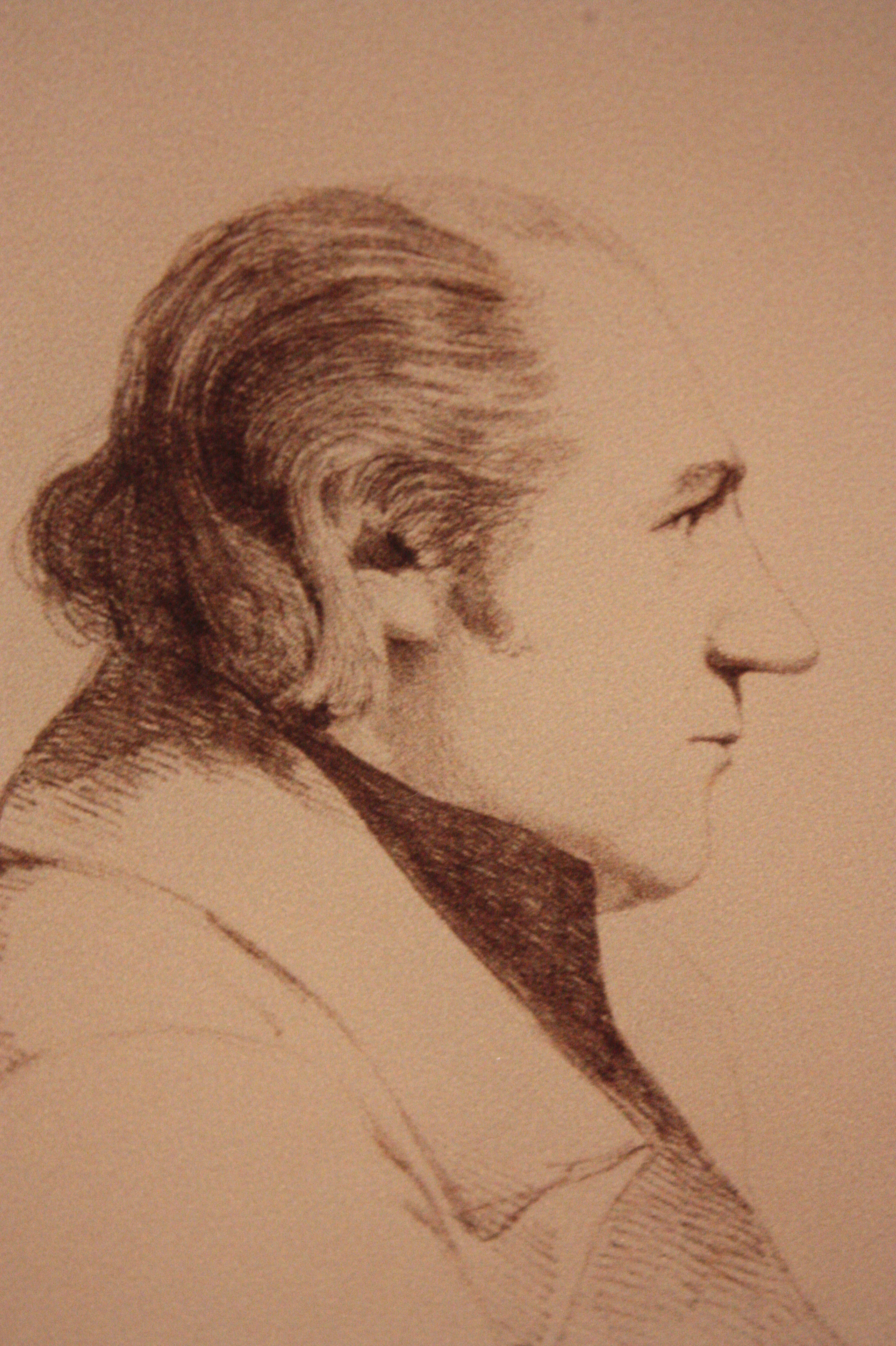
Alexander Dalrymple

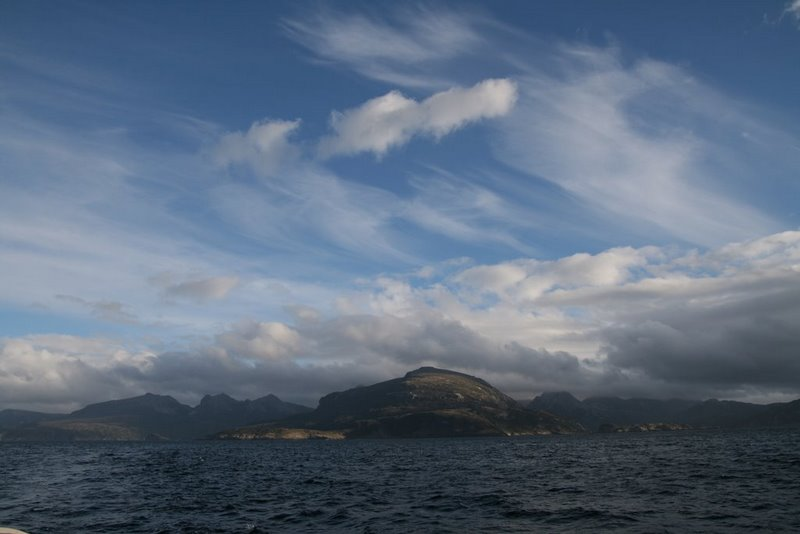
Le Maire Strait with Isla de los Estados in the background

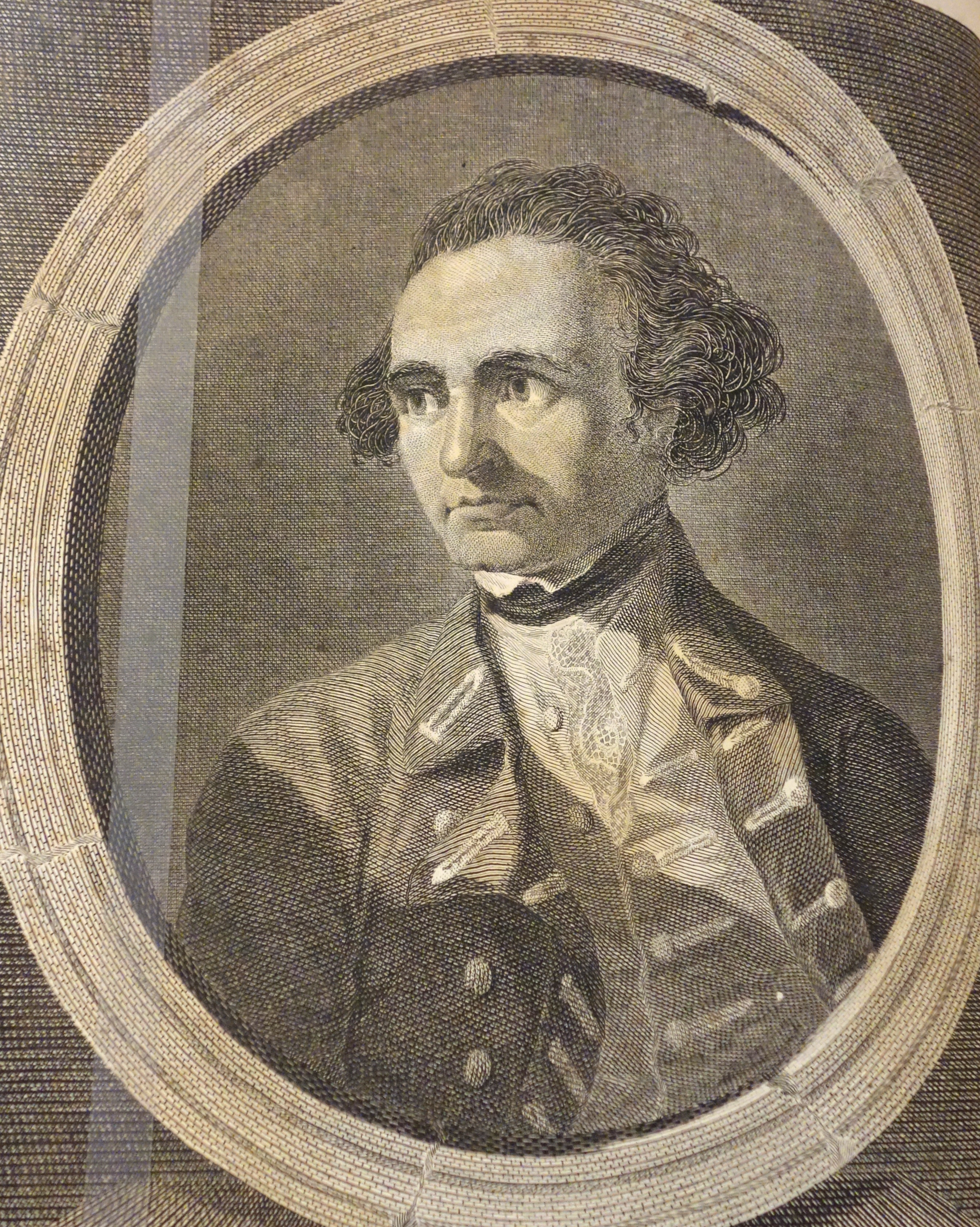
James Cook

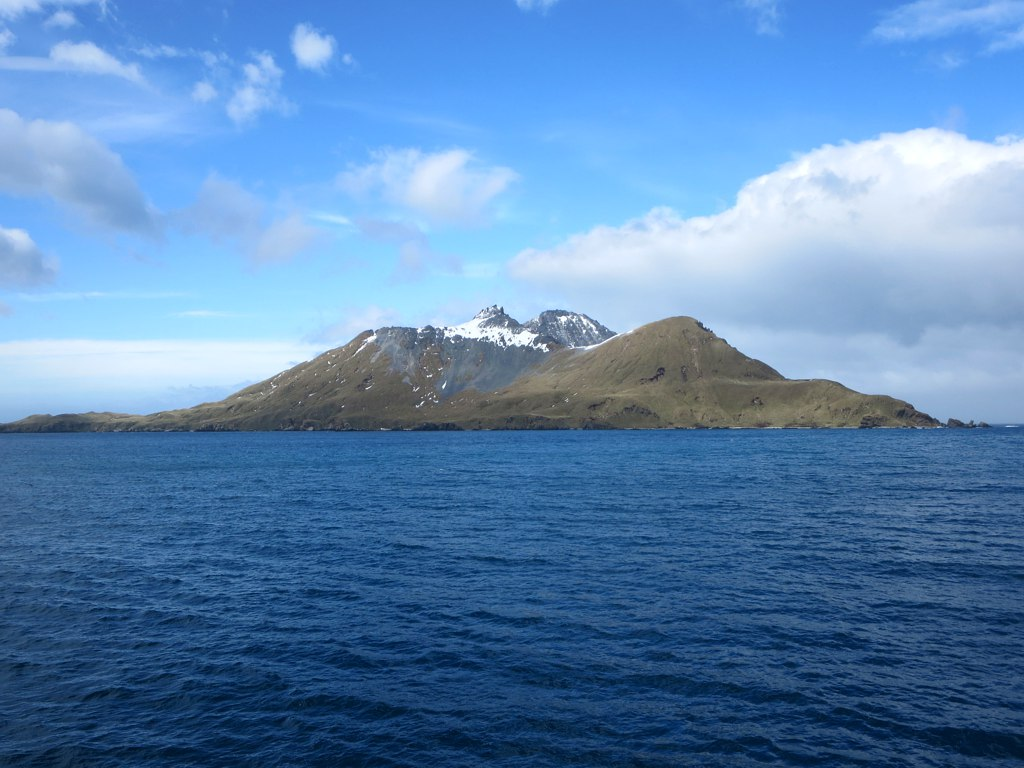
A west view of Cooper Island at the southeast extremity of South Georgia

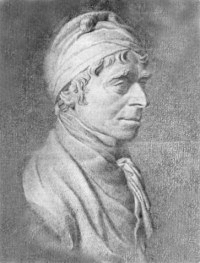
James Burney

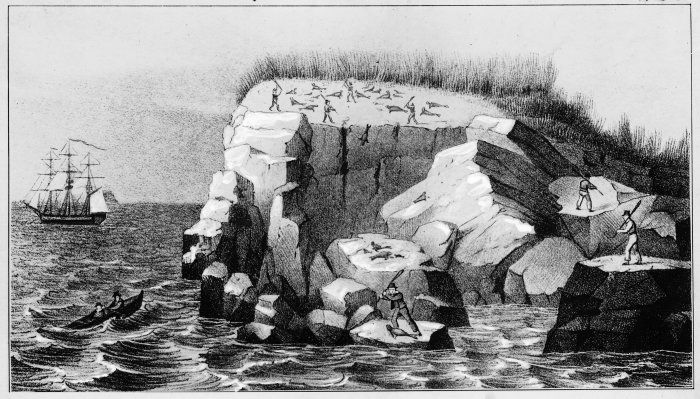
View of Beauchene Island, Falkland Islands

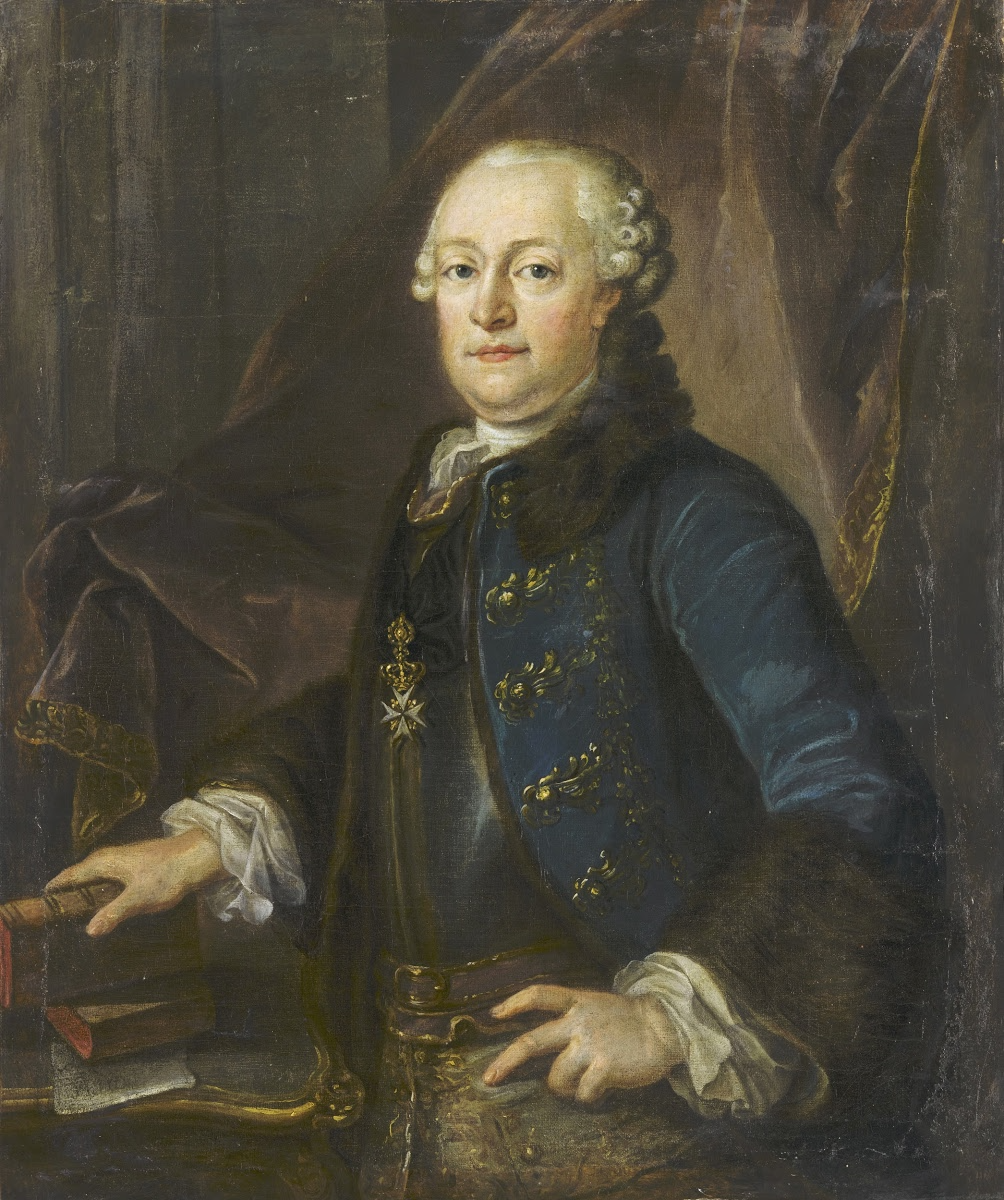
Charles Pierre Claret de Fleurieu

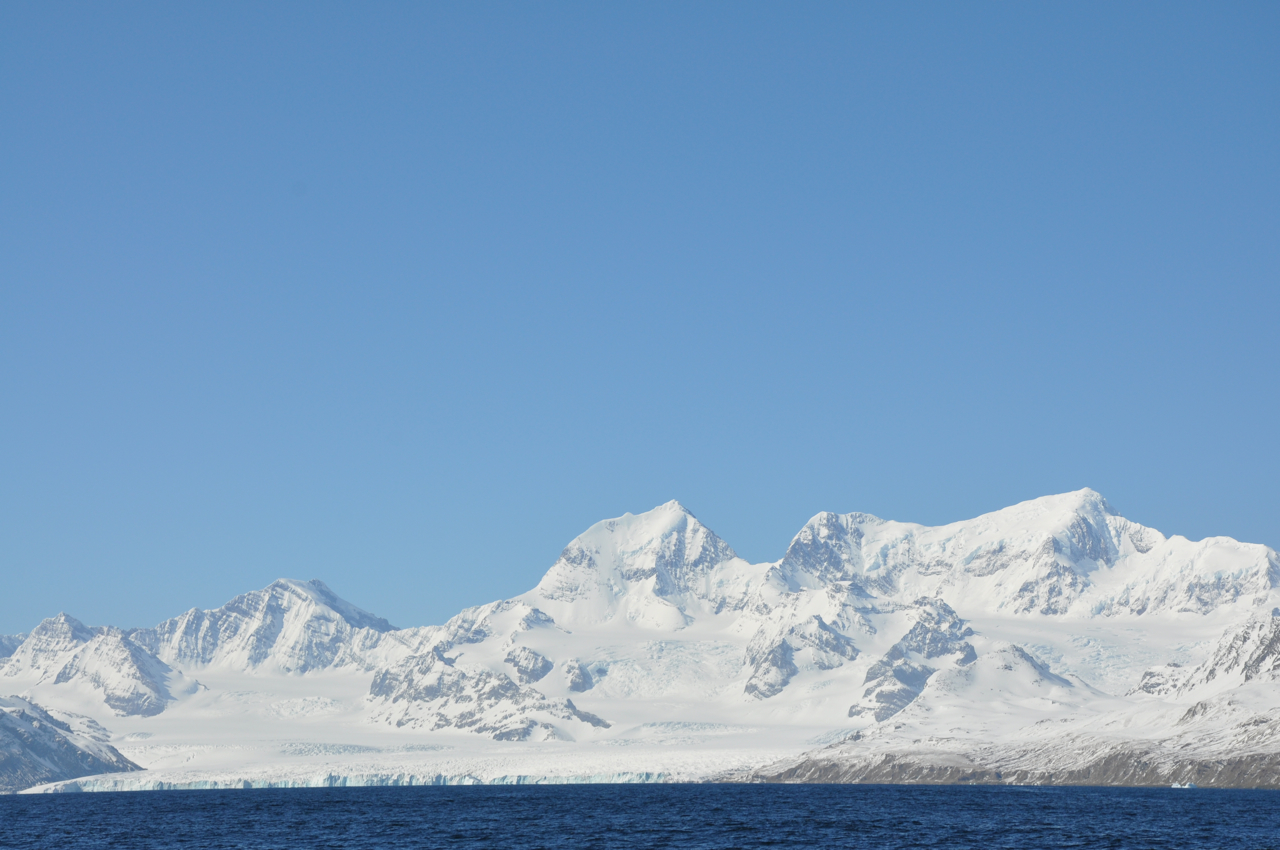
Allardyce Range, South Georgia

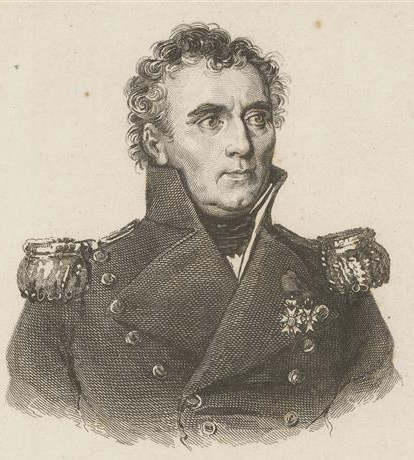
Louis-Isidore Duperrey

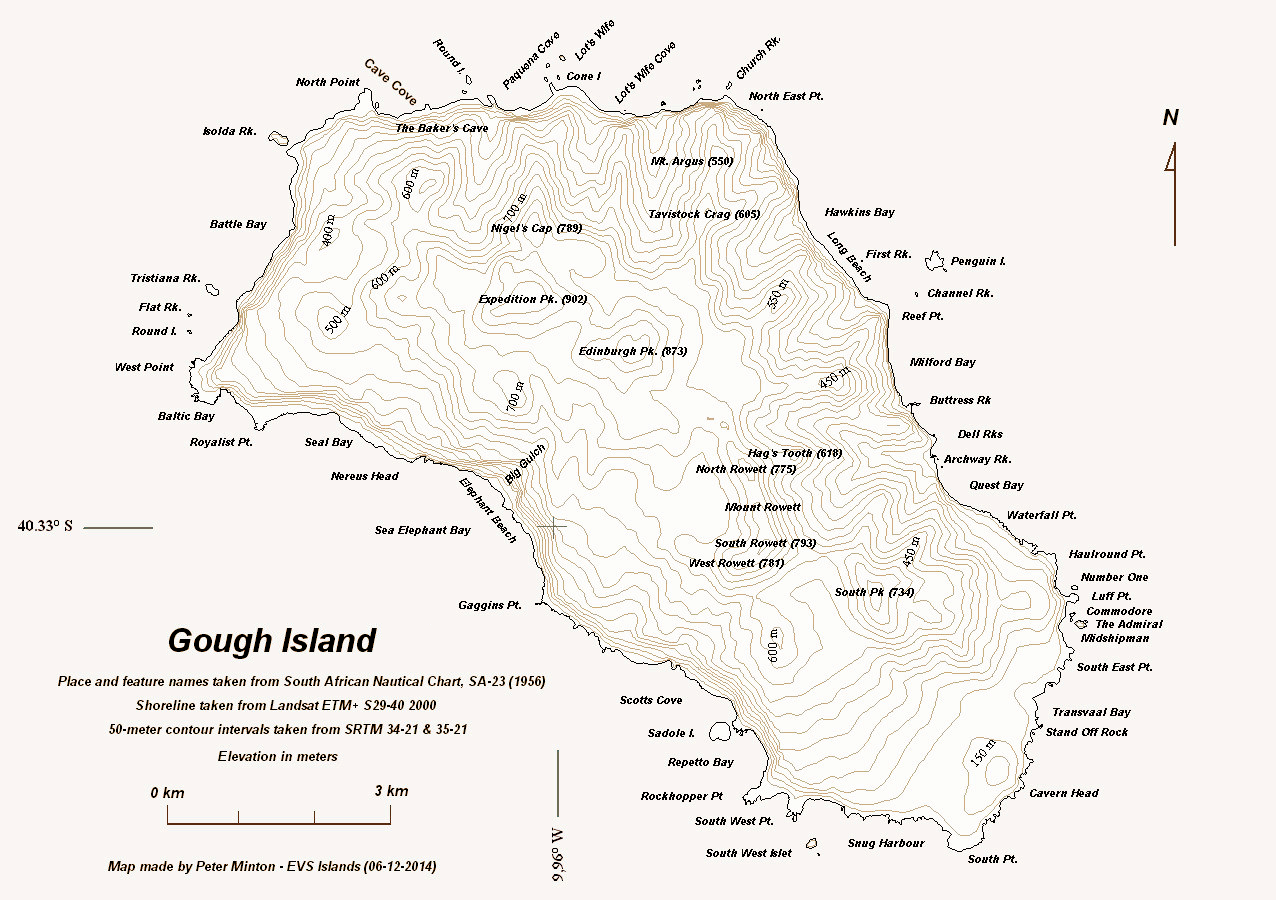
Map of Gough Island, Tristan da Cunha island group

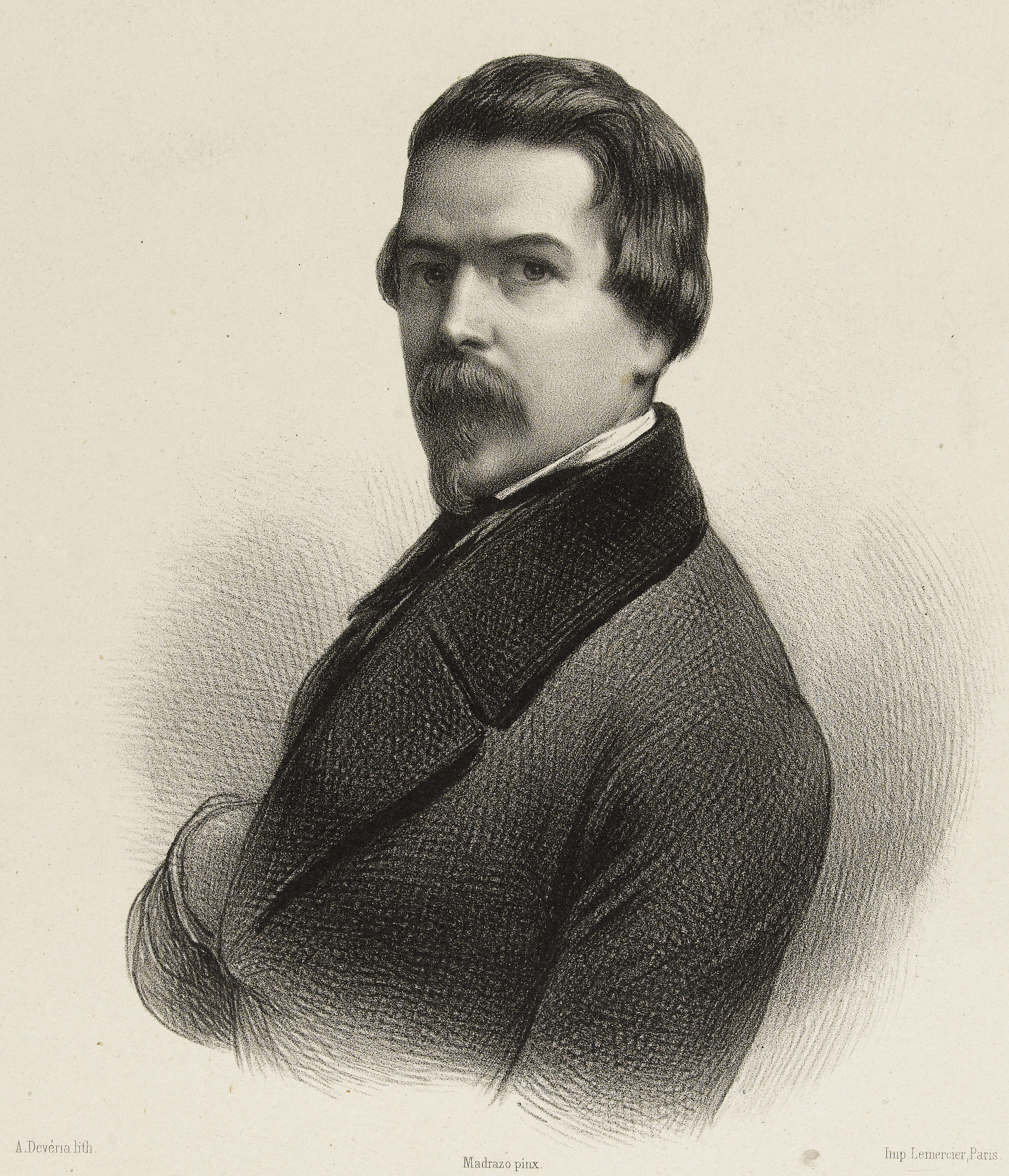
Francisco Adolfo de Varnhagen

The following 17th, 18th and 19th-century maps and charts reflect the geographical knowledge gained from La Roché's 1674-75 voyage:

- Albernaz, João Teixeira; Jeronimo de Attayde e Francisco de Seixas y Lovera. (1692). Mapas generales originales y universales des todo el orue con los puertos principales y fortalezas de Ambas Indias y una descripcion topographica de la region Austral Magallonica año de 1692. (The 1630 Portuguese atlas Taboas Geraes de Toda a Navegação appended in 1692 by the 1690 Spanish map insert Strait of Magellan and Tierra del Fuego.)
- Godson, William. (1702). A new and correct map of the world. London: George Willdey.
- L'Isle (or Lisle), Guillaume de & Charles-Louis Simonneau. (1703). Carte du Paraguai, du Chili, du Detroit de Magellan. Paris. (Shows the track of La Roché's; the Falkland Islands are called Isles de Sebald de Weert.)
- L'Isle (or Lisle), Guillaume de; J. Covens & C. Mortier. (1705). L'Amerique Meridionale. Paris.
- L'Isle (or Lisle), Guillaume de. (1708). L'Amerique Meridionale Dressee sur les Observations de Mrs. de l'Academie Royale des Sciences. Amsterdam: Peter Schenk. / Paris edition
- Senex, John. (1710). South America corrected from the Observations communicated to the Royal Society's of London & Paris. London. (Shows the track of La Roché's.)
- Visscher, Nicolaes. (1710). Carte du Paraguay, du Chili, Detroit de Magellan & Terre de Feu dans l'Amerique Meridionale. Amsterdam.
- Moll, Herman. (1711). A New & Exact Map of the Coast, Countries and Islands within ye Limits of ye South Sea Company. London. / 1726 edition
- Price, Charles. (ca. 1713). South America corrected from the observations communicated to the Royal Society's of London and Paris. London. (Shows the track of La Roché's.)
- Price, Charles. (ca. 1713). A Correct Map of the World with several useful Theories extracted from the Writings of the Greatest Mathematicians and Philosophers of the Age. London.
- Van der Aa, Pieter. (1714). L'Amérique méridionale. Leiden.
- Chatelain, Henry. (1714). Nouvelle Carte de Géographie de la Partie Méridionale de l'Amérique. Amsterdam.
- Moll, Herman. (1715). This map of South America, according to the newest and most exact observations. London.
- Price, Charles. (1715). Terrestrial Globe. London. (Curiously, the globe features Isle Grande same as the 1702 map by William Godson does, situated at 35°S latitude and named "la Roche’s Island.")
- L'Isle (or Lisle), Guillaume de. (1717). Carte du Paraguai, du Chili, du Detroit de Magellan. Amsterdam. (Shows the track of La Roché's.)
- Chatelain, Henri. (1719). Carte tres curieuse de la Mer du Sud Contenant des remarques nouvelles et tres utiles non seulement sur les ports et isles de cette mer, Mais aussy sur les principaux Pays de l'Amerique tant Septentrionale que Meridionale, Avec les Noms & la Route des Voyageurs. Amsterdam.
- Moll, Herman. (1719). A new & correct map of the whole World. London.
- Fer, Nicolas de. (1720). Partie la plus méridionale de l'Amérique, où se trouve le Chili, le Paraguay, et les Terres Magellaniques avec les Fameux Détroits de Magellan et de Le Maire. Paris.
- Covens, J. & C. Mortier. (1730). Carte du Paraguay, du Chili, du Detroit de Magellan &c. Amsterdam. (Shows the track of La Roché's.)
- Moll, Herman. (1732). A map of Chili, Patagonia, La Plata and ye south part of Brasil. London.
- Techo, Nicolas. (1733). Typus Geographicus Chili a Paraguay Freti Magellanici &c. Nuremberg.
- L'Isle (or Lisle), Guillaume de & Giambattista Albrizzi. (1740). Carta Geografica della America Meridionale. Venice.
- Seale, Richard W. (ca. 1744). A Map of South America. With all the European Settlements & whatever else is remarkable from the latest & best observations. London.
- Ottens, Reiner & Joshua. (1745). Tractus Australior Americae Meridionalis a Rio de la Plata per Fretum Magellanicum ad Toraltum. Amsterdam.
- Cowley, John. (ca. 1745). A Map of South America. London.
- Homann Heirs & Johann Haas. (1746). Americae Mappa generalis. Nuremberg.
- Jefferys, Thomas & John Green (aka Bradock Mead). (1753). A chart of North and South America: including the Atlantic and Pacific Oceans, with the nearest coasts of Europe, Africa and Asia. London. / 1776 edition
- Buache, Philippe. (1754). Carte des Terres Australes, Comprises entre le Tropique du Capricorne et le Pôle Antarctique. Paris.
- Gendron, Pedro. (1754). La America: dispuesta segun el Sistema de Mr. Hasius Profesor de Mathematicas en la Vniversidad de Witembergo, añadidos los ultimos descubrimientos por M. de Lisle. Madrid.
- Fer, Nicolas de. (1754). Mappe-Monde ou Carte Générale de la Terre. Paris.
- Jefferys, Thomas. (ca. 1754). South America. London.
- Le Rouge, Georges-Louis. (1756). Amerique Meridionale. Paris.
- Seutter, Matthäus. (1757). Le Pays de Perou et Chili. Augsbourg.
- Lotter, Tobias Conrad. (1757). America Meridionalis. Augsburg.
- Euler, Leonhard. (1762). Hemisphere Meridional dressé en 1754 par M. le Comte de Redern Curateur de l'Académie Royale des Sciences et des belles Lettres. Berlin.
- Delarochette, Louis. (ca. 1763). South America From the latest Discoveries. London: John Bowles.
- Dalrymple, Alexander & Thomas Jefferys. (1768). A chart of the ocean between South America and Africa with the tracks of Dr. Edmund Halley in 1700 and Monsr. Lozier Bouvet in 1738. London: J. Nourse. (This chart is the subject of Dalrymple's Memoir of a chart of the Southern Ocean; a supposed track of La Roché's is shown as departing from the east entrance to an imaginary Gulf of St. Sebastian in Terra Australis (admittedly borrowed from a 1586 edition of Ortelius's world map) that in January 1775 James Cook didn't find and wrote: "I think I may venture to assert that the extensive coast, laid down in Mr. Dalrymple's chart of the ocean between Africa and America, and the Gulph of St. Sebastian, do not exist." Isle Grande is located due north rather than northeast of Roché Island on this chart, which singularity might have been replicated in Cook's chart of the southern hemisphere. Certain areas on the chart would appear somewhat distorted, with southern South America shifted ca. 3° of longitude to the west.)
- Phinn, Thomas. (1771). South America. Edinburgh.
- Guthrie, William. (1771). South America. London.
- Bowen, Thomas. (1772). South America from the best Authorities. London: G. Robinson.
- Sayer, Robert. (1772). A General Map of America divided into North and South, and West Indies: with the Newest Discoveries. London.
- Jefferys, Thomas. (1776). South America. London.
- Cook, James. (1777). A Chart of the Southern Hemisphere; shewing the Tracks of some of the most distinguished Navigators. London: William Strahan & Thomas Cadell.
- Gibson, John. (1777). A New Map of the Whole Continent of America, divided into North and South America and West Indies, with a Descriptive Account of the European Possessions, as Settled by the Definitive Treaty of Peace, Concluded at Paris, Feby. 10th, 1763, Compiled from Mr. D'Anville's Maps of that Continent, and Corrected in the Several Parts belonging to Great Britain, from the Original Materials of Governor Pownall, MP. London: Robert Sayer.
- Robert de Vaugondy, Didier. (1777). Hemisphère Australe ou Antarctique. Paris.
- Seutter, Matthäus & Johann Michael Probst. (1784). Novus Orbis Sive America Meridionalis et Septentrionalis. Augsburg.
- Roberts, Henry. (1784). A General Chart: Exhibiting the Discoveries made by Captn. James Cook in this and his two preceeding [sic] Voyages; with the Tracks of Ships under his command. London.
- Walch, Johann. (ca.1790). L'Amerique Selon L'Etendue de ses Principales Parties. Augsburg.
- Elwe, Ian Barend. (1792). L'Amérique Méridionale. Amsterdam.
- Doolittle, Amos. (1793). South America. Boston: Thomas & Andrews.
- Dunn, Samuel. (1794). South America as Divided amongst The Spaniards and The Portuguese, The French and The Dutch. London.
- Arrowsmith, Aaron. (1794). Map of the World on a Globular Projection, Exhibiting Particularly the Nautical Researches of Capn. James Cook, F.R.S. with all the Recent Discoveries to the Present Time. London.
- Russell, John. (1794). A General Map of South America Drawn from the Best Surveys. London. / 1797 edition
- D'Anville, Jean Baptiste Bourguignon. (1795). A Map of South America. London: Laurie & Whittle.
- Carey, Mathew. (1796). A map of South America: According to the best authorities. Philadelphia.
- Morse, Jedidiah. (1804). South America from the best Authorities. Charleston, MA.
- Wilkinson, Robert. (1806). South America. London.
- Dessiou, Joseph Foss. (1808). A Chart of the Ethiopic or Southern Ocean, and part of the Pacific Ocean; from the Parallel of 3 Degrees North to 56°20' South Latitude etc. London: William Faden. (Features three possible locations of Isle Grande as per la Roché, Dalrymple and Cook.)
- Poirson, Jean-Baptiste. (ca. 1810–20). South America. Paris. (Features two Isle Grande islands, one "discovered by La Roché in 1675", and another, more westerly, "according to Mr. Dalrymple.")
- Tardieu, Ambroise. (1821). Carte De L'Amerique Meridionale Dressee pour l'intelligence de l'histoire generale des Voyages de Laharpe. Paris.
- Johnson, Alvin Jewett & Ross Browning. (1861). Johnson’s South America. New York.

=== Various ===
Apart from mapping, both La Roché and his geographic discoveries have been used in encyclopedic editions and dictionaries, scientific and popular publications, video gaming, commercial promotion etc. (see Bibliography).

=== Honours ===
Roché Peak, the summit of Bird Island, South Georgia, and Roché Glacier in Vinson Massif, Antarctica are named for Anthony de la Roché.

The Overseas Territory of South Georgia and the South Sandwich Islands issued in 2000 a two pound coin commemorating the 325th anniversary of the discovery of South Georgia by La Roché.

=== Namesake ===
A sea captain named Anthony de la Roche was reportedly in command of a merchant ship owned by the prominent Bermudian Henry Corbusier in the late 1770s, having previously commanded the ship Saint James of Bordeaux, France, which got wrecked.

== See also ==
- History of South Georgia and the South Sandwich Islands
- Clerke Rocks
- Gough Island
- Roché Glacier
- Roché Peak

== Bibliography ==
- Coleti, Giandomenico. (1771). Dizionario Storico-Geografico dell’ America Meridionale. Venezia: Stampedaria Coleti. p. 117.
- Alcedo, Antonio de. (1788). Diccionario Geográfico-Histórico de las Indias Occidentales ó América. Tomo IV. Madrid: Manuel Gonzalez. p. 435.
- Cruttwell, Clement. (1808). The New Universal Gazetteer or Geographical Dictionary: Containing a description of all the empires, kingdoms, states, provinces, cities, towns, ports, seas, harbours, rivers, lakes, mountains, and capes in the known world. Second edition. Vol. II. (Entries for Land, or island of de la Roche, and Isle Grande, or La Roche.)
- Navarrete, Martín Fernández de. (1846). Disertación sobre la historia de la náutica y de las ciencias matemáticas que han contribuido á sus progresos entre los españoles. Madrid: Imprenta de la Viuda de Calero. 421 pp.
- USBGN. (1956). Geographic Names of Antarctica. Washington, D.C.: Office of Geography, Department of the Interior. pp. 9, 11, 287.
- David, Andrew. (2012–21). Roché, Antonio de la. In: The Dictionary of Falklands Biography (including South Georgia). Ed. David Tatham.
- Caviglia, Sergio Esteban. (2015). Malvinas: Soberanía, Memoria y Justicia. Vol. II: Balleneros – Loberos – Misioneros. S. XVIII-XIX. Rawson: Ministerio de Educación de la Provincia de Chubut. 300 pp.
- Gutiérrez, Eduardo Fernández. (2019). San Telmo en la Antártida. Conferencia San Telmo en el Nuevo y Viejo Mundo. Frómista, 23 Febrero 2019. 6 pp.
- A.G.M. (2021). Anthony de la Roché. Base Antártica Española Gabriel de Castilla: Exploradores Antárticos.
- France Diplomacy. (2024). Antarctica. Ministère de l'Europe et des Affaires étrangères.
- Campbell, David G. (2002). The Crystal Desert: Summers in Antarctica. Boston & New York: Houghton Mifflin. p. 154.
- Hince, Bernadette. (2000). The Antarctic Dictionary: A Complete Guide to Antarctic English. Collingwood: Csiro Publishing, 2000. p. 335.
- Nardo, Don. (2011). Polar Explorations. Lucent Books. p. 46.
- Young, Jonah. (1015). Southern Ocean: Oceanographer's Perspective. Ice Press. p. 3.
- Dubov, Kalman. (2020). Journeys to the Antarctic Peninsula: Review & Analysis. San Antonio, TX. Accessed 2024.
- Wilson, Eric. (2003). The Spiritual History of Ice: Romanticism, science, and the imagination. New York, NY & Houndmills, England: Palgrave Macmillan. p. 157.
- Manjunath R. (ed.). (2021). Timelines of Nearly Everything. Bangalore. p. 112. Accessed 2024.
- Heiney, Paul. (2017). Cape Horn and Antarctic Waters: including Chile, the Beagle Channel, the Falkland Islands and the Antarctic Peninsula. St. Ives, England: Imray, Laurie, Norie & Wilson. p. 157.
- Possession Day in South Georgia and the South Sandwich Islands: January 17. AnydayGuide. Accessed 2024.
- Gubert, Romain. (2024). À qui appartient l’Antarctique? Le Point, 6 janvier 2024.
- Elite Dangerous: Anthony de la Roche Gateway
- Farer Watches Roché: Story.
- Playground Expedition: Children playground constructions: Anthony de la Roche.
