= Hesse Peak =

Mountain in South Georgia

Hesse Peak (54°2′S 38°0′W) is, at 515 metres (1,690 ft), the highest peak on Paryadin Ridge, lying midway between Cape Alexandra and Cape Paryadin at the west end of South Georgia. It was charted and named by a German expedition under Kohl-Larsen in 1928–29.
