= Hornaday Rock =

Hornaday Rock (54°1′S 38°1′W) is a rock lying in Bird Sound, 0.6 nautical miles (1.1 km) west-southwest of Cape Alexandra at the west end of South Georgia. The feature appears on charts dating back to the 1930s. It was recharted by the South Georgia Survey in the period 1951–57, and named by the UK Antarctic Place-Names Committee for William T. Hornaday, an American zoologist who was Director of the New York Zoological Park, 1896–1926. From 1907 he was a leader in the fight to introduce protective legislation for fur seals; fur seals breed on nearby Bird Island.
