= Paryadin Ridge =

Ridge in South Georgia

Paryadin Ridge (54°2′S 38°0′W) is a ridge extending from Cape Alexandra to Cape Paryadin at the west end of South Georgia. The name "Paryadin-Kamm," derived from nearby Cape Paryadin, was given by Ludwig Kohl-Larsen during his visit to South Georgia in 1928–29. An English form of the name has been approved.

Hesse Peak is the highest peak on Paryadin Ridge.
