= Roché Peak =

Mountain in South Georgia

Location of Roché Peak on Bird Island

Roché Peak (54°00′S 38°02′W) is a conspicuous peak rising to 365 metres (1,198 ft), the highest feature on Bird Island, South Georgia. It stands 1.6 kilometres (0.99 mi) west of the east extremity of the island. The name La Roche Strait, for the nearby strait between Bird Island and South Georgia, was used for many years but has now been replaced in usage by Bird Sound. The name Roché Peak, given by the UK Antarctic Place-names Committee in 1960, preserves the original name for the area. The Englishman merchant Anthony de la Roché discovered South Georgia in 1675.

== See also ==
- Anthony de la Roché
- Roché Glacier
