= Clerke Rocks =

Group of UK-administered islands in the subantarctic South Atlantic

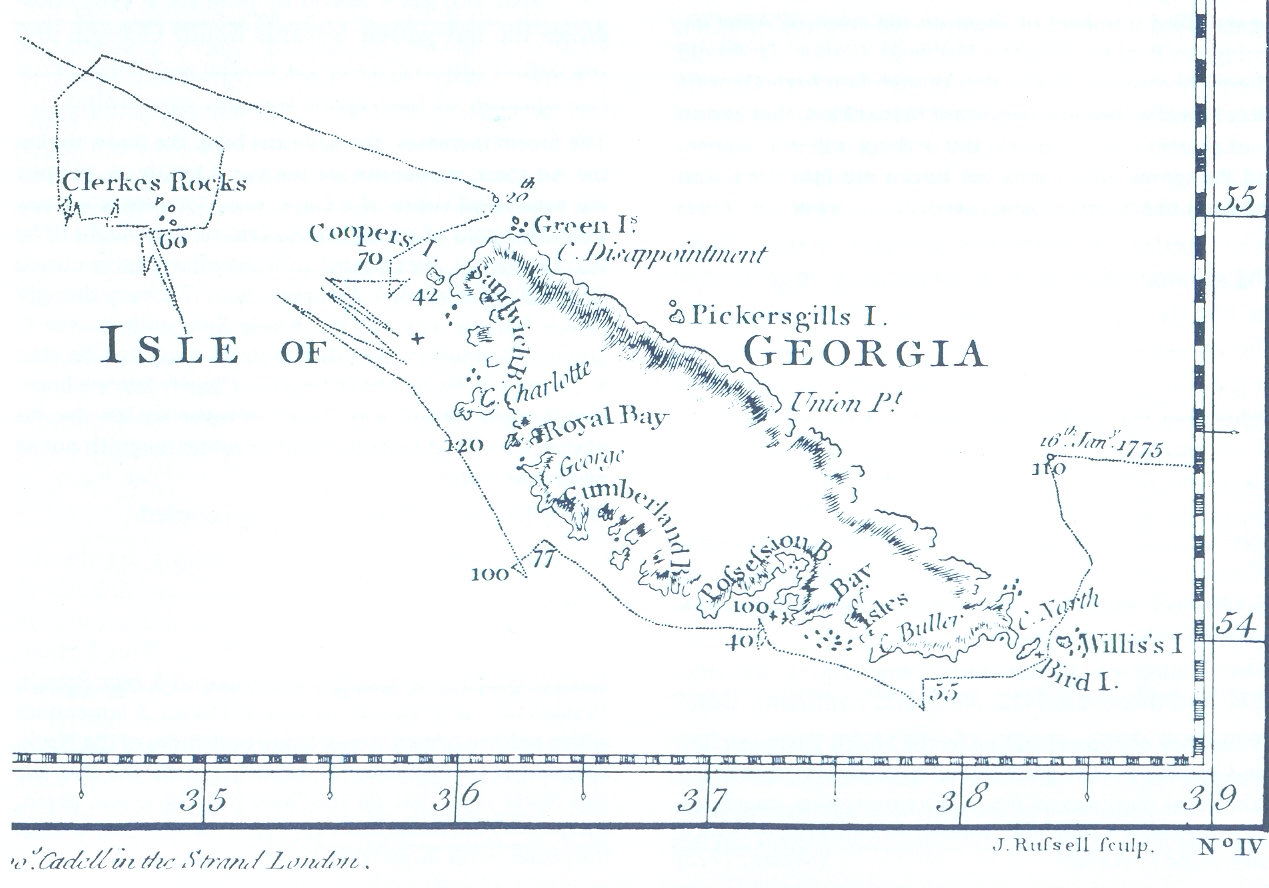
- The Clerke Rocks, can be seen on this North-down Cook's map
- Interactive map of Clerke Rocks

Geography
- Coordinates: 55°01′S 34°41′W
- Archipelago: South Georgia

Administration
- United Kingdom

Demographics
- Population: 0

The Clerke Rocks are a group of small rocky islands some 35 miles (56 km) southeast of South Georgia that extend 5 miles (8.0 km) from east to west. The Clerke Rocks include The Office Boys (Spanish: Los Mandaderos) at the northeastern end and Nobby (Spanish: Islote Llamativo or Roca Notable) at the southeastern end of the group. The highest island reaches 242 m (794 ft) above sea level. The rocks are similar to those found at Drygalski Fjord on South Georgia. Vegetation is largely absent but there is sparse lichen flora.

As on the Shag Rocks, cormorants make up a large part of the bird population. Macaroni penguins and black-browed albatrosses are known to breed here, and other birds may also do so. Antarctic fur seals also breed here.

The islands, possibly seen first by Anthony de la Roché in April 1675, were discovered in 1775 by a British expedition under Captain James Cook, who named them for Charles Clerke, an officer on HMS Resolution, who first saw the rocks. There are no natural landing places; the first landing was made in 1927 by Norwegian whalers, who collected rock samples. Since then, three further landings have been recorded, two of them for scientific purposes.

Along with South Georgia, the South Sandwich Islands and the Shag Rocks, the islands are part of a 200 mile maritime zone proclaimed in 1992. The islands belong to the British Overseas Territory of South Georgia and the South Sandwich Islands and are also claimed by Argentina as part of Tierra del Fuego Province. Fishing in the zone is licensed by the South Georgia authorities which administer quotas and regulate the trade.

== See also ==
- Anthony de la Roché
- Composite Antarctic Gazetteer
- History of South Georgia and the South Sandwich Islands
- List of Antarctic islands north of 60° S
- Scientific Committee on Antarctic Research
