= Nobby (Antarctica) =

Rock in the subantarctic South Atlantic

Coordinates: 55°2′S 34°38′W

Nobby is a rock at the southeast end of the Clerke Rocks, lying some 40 nautical miles (70 km) east-southeast of the southeast end of South Georgia. The Clerke Rocks were discovered by Captain James Cook in 1775. Nobby was probably given this descriptive name by DI personnel, who made surveys of the South Georgia area in the period 1926–30.
