= Willis Islands =

Main island of the South Georgia Islands

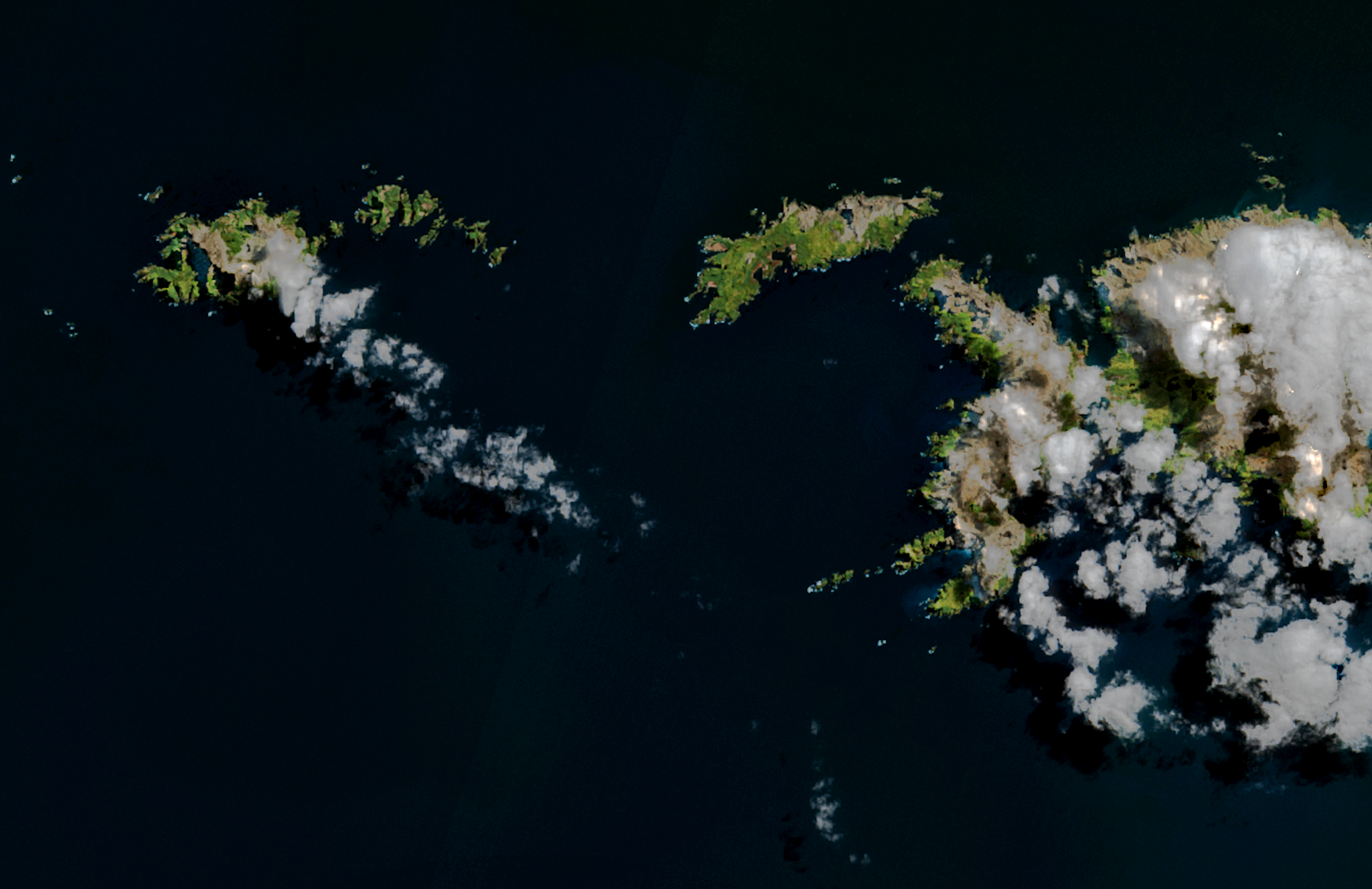
- Satellite image of Willis Islands to the left

- Location of Willis Islands

Geography
- Location: South Atlantic Ocean
- Coordinates: 54°0′S 38°11′W
- Archipelago: South Georgia Islands

Administration
- United Kingdom
- Overseas Territory: South Georgia and the South Sandwich Islands

Demographics
- Population: 1 (2010)

The Willis Islands are a small archipelago to the west of South Georgia Island in the South Georgia Islands. They are 2 miles (3.2 km) west of Bird Island, separated by the Stewart Strait. They were discovered on 14 January 1775 by Captain James Cook and named for Cook's midshipman Thomas Willis, the crew member who first sighted them. The Willis Islands were charted in greater detail and individually named by Discovery Investigations (DI) personnel between 1926 and 1930.

== Geography ==
=== Main Island ===

The archipelago's largest island is called Main Island, so-named because at 1.7 mi (2.7 km) long and 1,800 ft (550 m) high, it is the principal island in the group.

Its southwestern point is called Johannesen Point, originally "All Johannesens Point," likely by DI personnel. Following a survey of the island in 1951–52, the South Georgia Survey (SGS) reported that the cumbersome name was seldom used locally. On that basis, the UK Antarctic Place-Names Committee (UK-APC) recommended the present shortened form of the name.

=== West and south of Main Island ===
West of Main Island are several named rocks, groups of rocks, and shoals.

Acorn Rock rises 20 m (66 ft) above sea level, 0.35 mi (0.6 km) northwest of Main Island. The descriptive name was applied during a hydrographic survey from HMS Owen (K640) in 1960–61. 1.5 nmi (3 km) northwest of Main Island is Holgate Shoal, an area of shoals named by the UK-APC for Able Seaman Ralph A. Holgate of the Owen, which charted the shoal in 1961. A pair of rocks named the Tiger Rocks are located 1.5 nmi (3 km) west of Main Island, southwest of the shoal. The descriptive name was applied during the surveys from the Owen. The westernmost point of the Willis Islands is a group of three barren rocks called the Ramp Rocks, 2.5 nmi (4.6 km) northwest of Johannesen Point on Main Island. The largest of them was originally called laavebrua ("threshing floor ramp") by Norwegian whalers, but to avoid confusion with Låvebrua Island, UK-APC named the trio the Ramp Rocks.

One nmi (2 km) west-southwest of the south end of Main Island is a small group of rocks named the Bryde Rocks. Positioned by the SGS between 1951 and 1957, the group was named by UK-APC for Thorleif Bryde, a gunner of the South Georgia Whaling Co.

Pugh Shoal is an area of shoal 1.5 nmi (2.8 km; 1.7 mi) south of Main Island, named by UK-APC for Able Seaman Peter J. Pugh of the Owen, which charted this shoal in 1961.

=== East of Main Island ===
Heron Passage separates Main Island from Vaughan Island close to the east, and Trinity Island 0.7 mi (1.1 km) to the northeast. The existence of the passage was first reported in the 1930s, and confirmed by HMS Owen during a hydrographic survey of the area in 1961. It was named by UK-APC after one of the Owen's survey motor boats, the Heron.

Vaughan Island is a small, conical tussock-covered island close east of Main Island. It was named by UK-APC for Lieutenant Commander Hugh L.F. Vaughan, Royal Navy, First Lieutenant of the Owen. The much larger Trinity Island was so-named by DI because it has three peaks. To the southeast are a pair of small tussock-covered islands called the Verdant Islands, descriptively named "Verdant Island" by DI. The name was amended in 1985 to reflect that there were actually two islands there. To the east is Hall Island, small, steep-sided, and tussock-covered. It was named by UK-APC after Commander Geoffrey P.D. Hall of the Royal Navy, Commanding Officer of the Owen. The easternmost island in the group is Proud Island, a small, relatively high, tussock-covered island, rising to a peak at its northern end. It was descriptively named by UK-APC, the expression "standing proud" in naval parlance being the equivalent of "sticking up."

Vaughan Island

Trinity Island

Verdant Islands

Hall Island

Proud Island

== Fauna ==
The Willis Islands are a significant breeding ground for Antarctic fur seals.

== See also ==
- Composite Gazetteer of Antarctica
- List of Antarctic and subantarctic islands
  - List of Antarctic islands north of 60° S
- Scientific Committee on Antarctic Research (SCAR)
- Territorial claims in Antarctica
