= Thomas Willis (sailor) =

Sailor on the second voyage of James Cook

Thomas Willis (1756-1797) was a sailor with the Second voyage of James Cook.

Willis was born in 1756, the son of Richard Willis, M.A., Rector of Hartley Mauditt, Hampshire, by his wife Anne (née) Hawkins. Thomas Willis began his career in the Royal Navy aboard HMS Dunkirk in 1769; he served on several other ships before joining the crew of Captain James Cook on HMS Resolution in 1772. The Willis Islands in the South Georgia Islands were named for Willis, the first to sight them. Willis kept a journal of his time with Cook.

Following the voyage, he was commissioned as a lieutenant in 1778, and joined HMS Sultan. He lost his right leg in 1782 whilst serving as second lieutenant aboard the Royal William, during skirmishes with French and Spanish forces. Willis married Mary, daughter of Anthony Kirkham, of Deal, Kent, in 1781, and had a son, Richard. Willis died 15 July 1797. The Victoria Cross recipient Major Richard Raymond Willis was the great-great-great nephew of Thomas Willis.
