= Smaaland Cove =

Smaaland Cove (54°52′S 36°3′W) is a cove lying 1 nautical mile (1.9 km) west of Doubtful Bay along the southeast coast of South Georgia in the southern Atlantic Ocean. The name Doubtful Bay was given to this feature during the survey by DI personnel in 1927, with the name Smaaland Bay appearing on their chart for a bay 1 nautical mile (1.9 km) to the east. The SGS, 1951–52, reported that both names are well established locally, but that they are always used in the reverse positions shown on the DI chart. In order to conform to local usage and provide the most suitable descriptive term, the name Smaaland Cove is approved for the feature now described. The name Doubtful Bay has been approved for the bay to the east.
