= Låvebrua Island =

Island in Antarctica

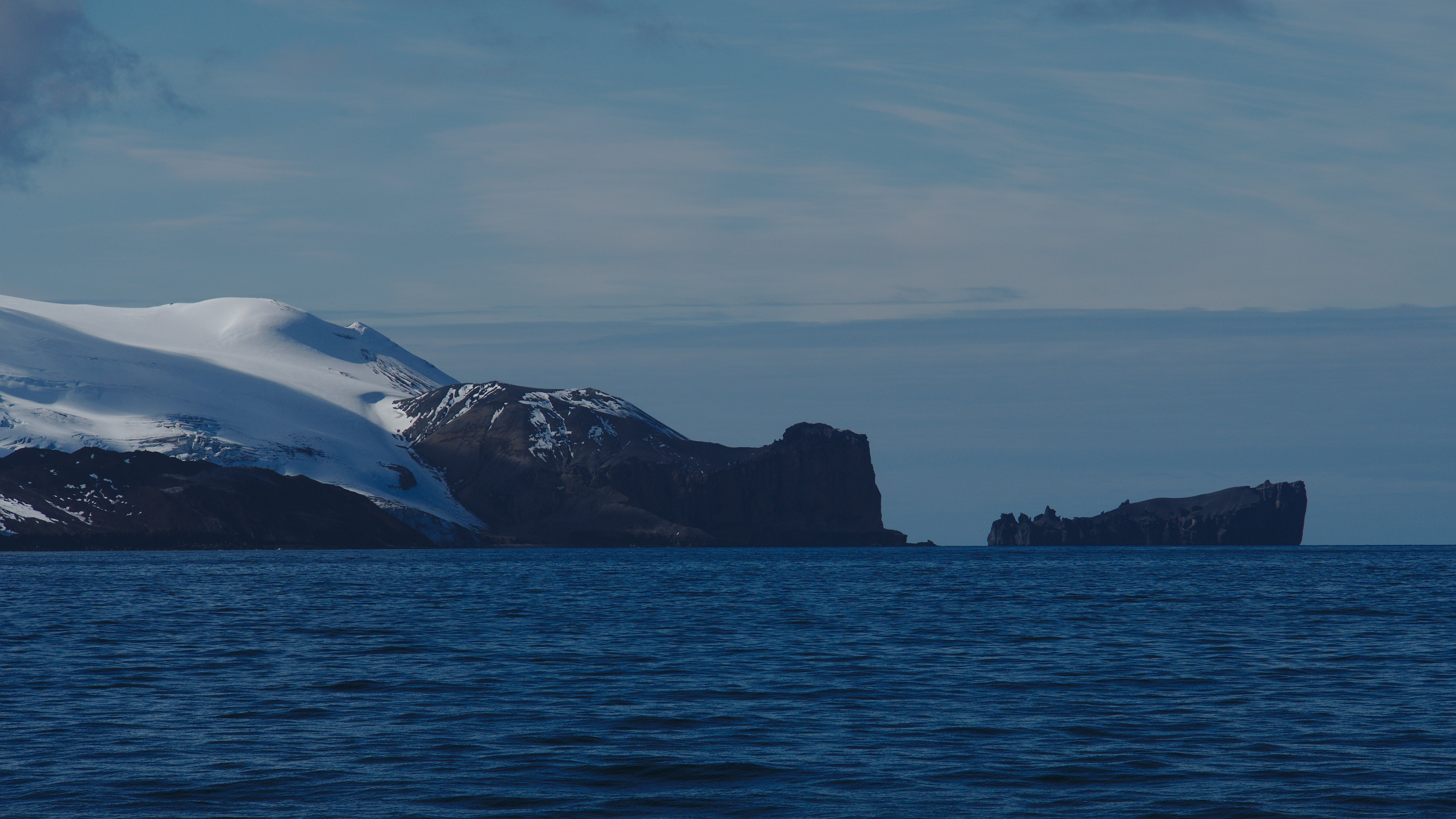
- Låvebrua ISland (right) and Deception Island (left)

- Location within Antarctic Peninsula Location within Antarctica

Geography
- Location: Antarctica
- Coordinates: 63°01′20″S 60°34′40″W
- Highest elevation: 95 m (312 ft)

Administration
- Administered under the Antarctic Treaty System

Demographics
- Population: Uninhabited

Låvebrua Island is an island, 95 metres (310 ft) high, lying 1.3 kilometres (0.7 nmi) east of South Point, Deception Island, in the South Shetland Islands off Antarctica. It was charted by a British expedition under Henry Foster, 1828–31. The name was given by Norwegian whalers operating from Deception Island, and was in use as early as 1927; it is descriptive, meaning literally "threshing floor bridge" or "barn bridge", and was a slang word for the inclined plane of the whaling factories' slipway.

== See also ==
- List of antarctic and sub-antarctic islands
