= Slossarczyk Crag =

Slossarczyk Crag (54°51′S 35°59′W) is a mountain crag, 805 m, between Doubtful Bay and Esbensen Bay at the southeast end of South Georgia. Surveyed by the SGS in the period 1951–57. Named by the United Kingdom Antarctic Place-Names Committee (UK-APC) for Third Officer Walter Slossarczyk, communications officer on the Deutschland during the German Antarctic Expedition under Filchner until his death in South Georgia on November 26, 1911. Filchner had named the present Doubtful Bay for Slossarczyk, but the earlier naming did not survive.
