= Rumbolds Point =

Rumbolds Point (54°52′S 36°0′W) is a point which marks the east side of the entrance to Doubtful Bay at the southeast end of South Georgia. The name appears on a chart based upon surveys of this area in 1930 by DI personnel, but may reflect an earlier naming.
