= South Point (Deception Island) =

South Point (63°1′S 60°37′W) is a point 1.75 nautical miles (3.2 km) southwest of Entrance Point, marking the southernmost point of Deception Island, in the South Shetland Islands. The point was charted by a British expedition 1828–31, under Foster. The name was proposed in 1949 by the Hydrographic Dept., Admiralty, following a survey of the island by Lieutenant Commander D.N. Penfold, Royal Navy, in 1948–49.
