= Doubtful Bay =

Coordinates: 54°52′S 36°1′W

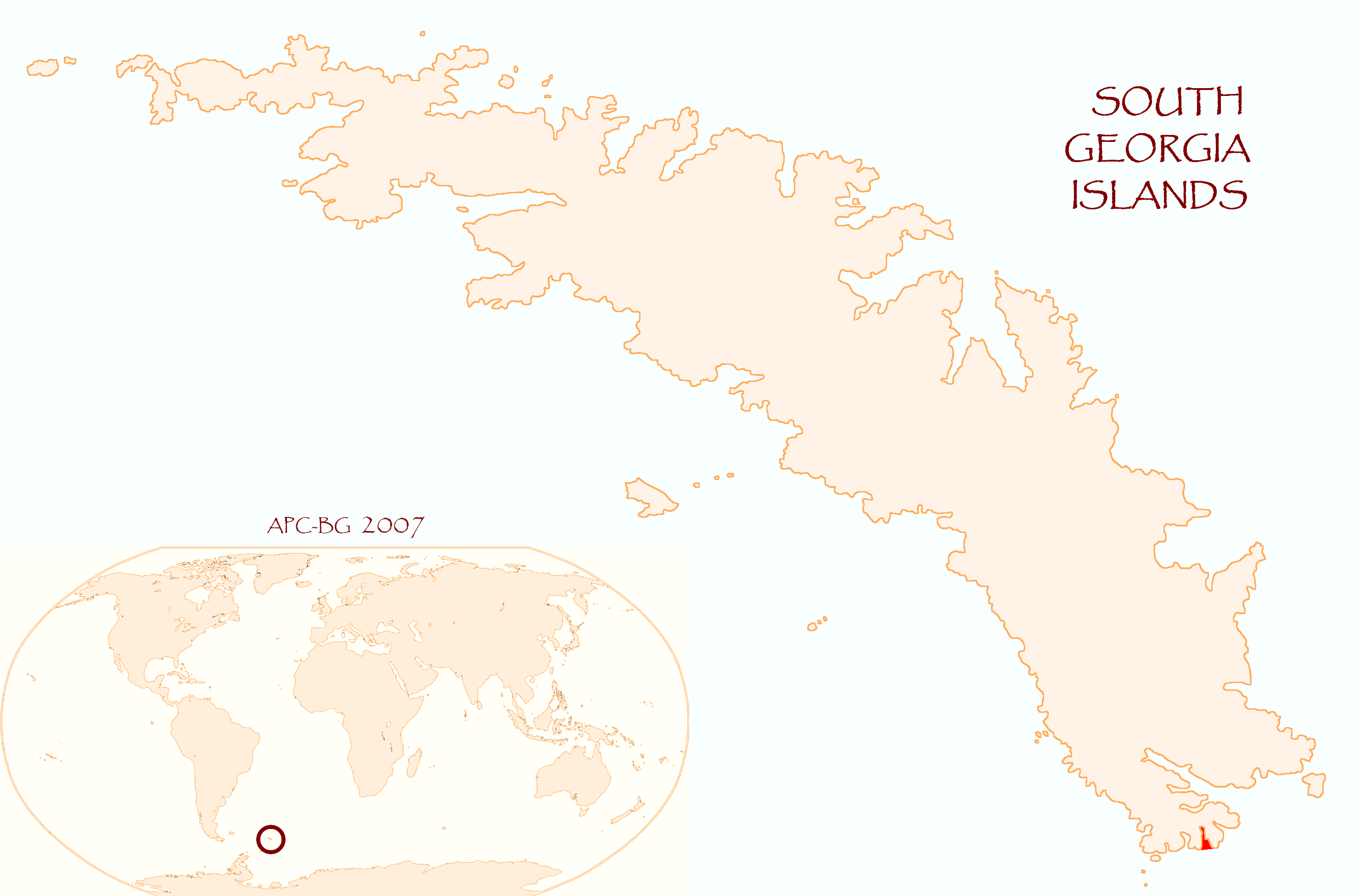
Location of Doubtful Bay on South Georgia Island

Doubtful Bay is a small, deeply indented bay, which lies 1 mile (1.6 km) east-northeast of Smaaland Cove and immediately west of Rumbolds Point on the southeast coast of South Georgia. It was charted by the Second German Antarctic Expedition under Wilhelm Filchner, 1911–12, who named it for Walter Slossarczyk, third officer of the expedition ship Deutschland. Later the names "Doubtful Bay" and "Smaaland Bay" (now Smaaland Cove) were erroneously transposed on charts of this area. The South Georgia Survey, 1951–52, reported that the name "Slossarczyk Bay" is not known locally and that this feature is best known as Doubtful Bay. Despite the undoubted priority of Filchner's naming, the name Doubtful Bay is approved in order to conform with local usage. The name Slossarczyk Crag has been approved for the elevation at the east side of the Bay.

The bay is not far from Drygalski Fjord and Cape Disappointment.
