= Cooper Island, South Georgia =

Small island near South Georgia

Cooper Island
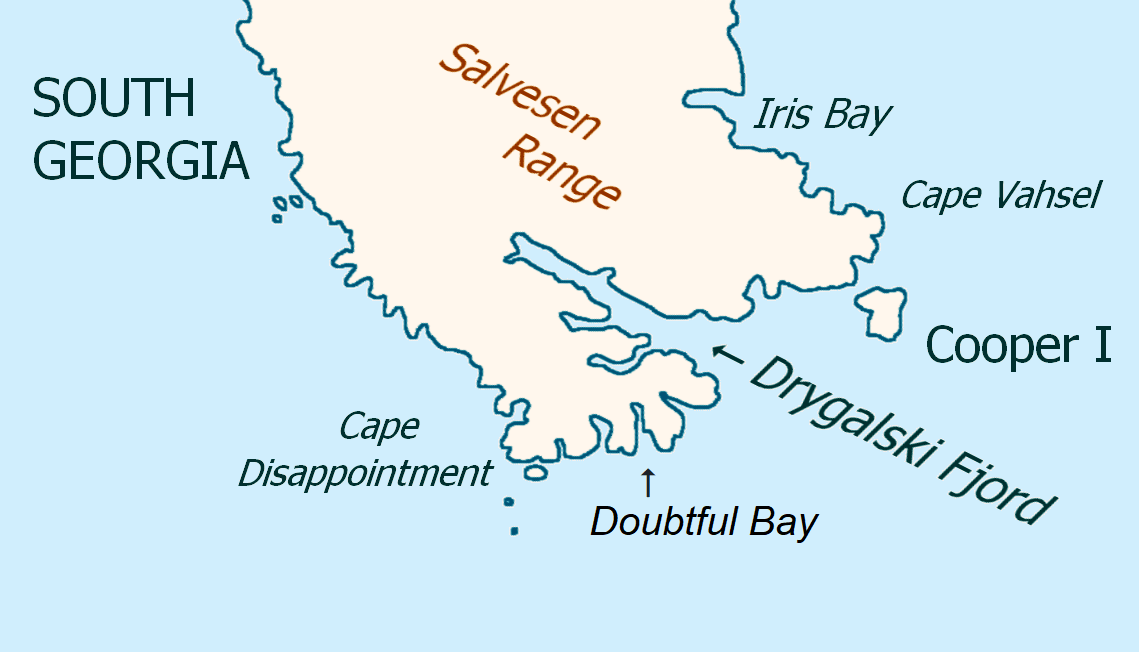

- Southeast extremity of South Georgia with Cooper Island

Geography
- Coordinates: 54°48′S 35°47′W
- Archipelago: South Georgia
- Length: 2 mi (3 km)
- Highest elevation: 1,365 ft (416.1 m)

Administration
- United Kingdom
- Overseas Territory: South Georgia and the South Sandwich Islands

Demographics
- Population: 0

Cooper Island is a small island, 2 miles (3.2 km) long, which lies at the north side of the entrance to Drygalski Fjord, off the southeast end of South Georgia. It was discovered by a British expedition under James Cook in 1775, and named for Lieutenant Robert Palliser Cooper, an officer aboard HMS Resolution.

A navigable channel, Cooper Sound, nearly 1 mile (1.6 km) wide, separates Cooper Island from the coast of the main island of South Georgia. There is a small bay, Known as Cooper Bay, 1.3 miles (2.1 km) southwest of Cape Vahsel on the mainland, and 1 mile (1.6 km) northwest of Cooper Island, indenting the southeast end of South Georgia, which derives its name from Cooper Island.

The island reaches 416 metres (1,365 ft) at its highest point, and the upper parts of the island are above the snow line.

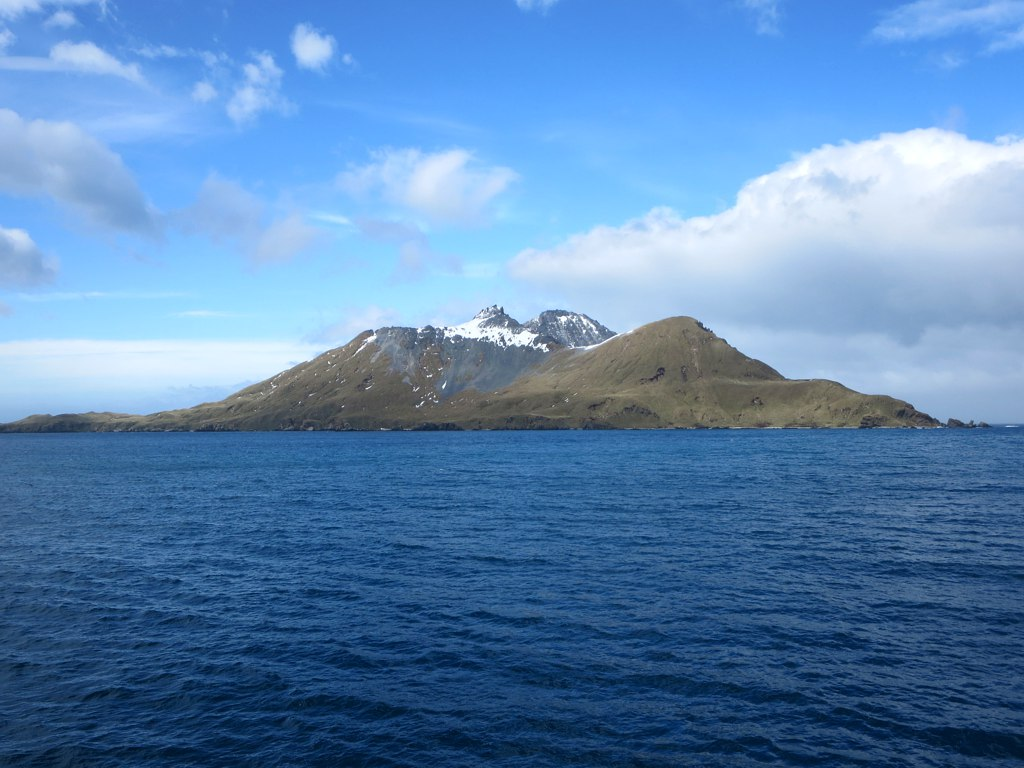
Cooper Island

== Wildlife ==
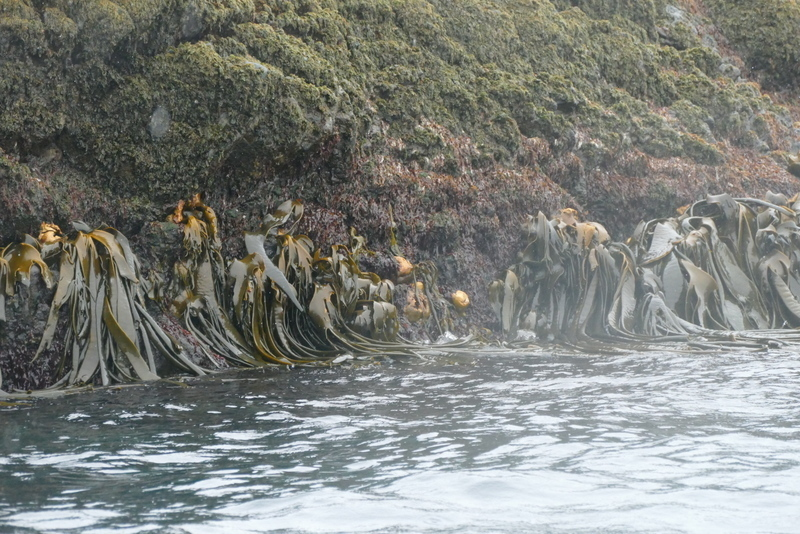
Durvillaea antarctica southern bull kelp growing in Cooper Bay

As one of a handful of rat-free islands, Cooper Island is South Georgia's only Special Protection Area; it has large numbers of sea birds, including snow petrels, Antarctic prions, 12,000 pairs of black-browed albatross, chinstrap penguins, and 20,000 macaroni penguins. There are also a number of fur seals, and this is one of the few places where they were not hunted by humans.

The island is covered in tussock grass.

== See also ==
- Composite Antarctic Gazetteer
- History of South Georgia and the South Sandwich Islands
- List of Antarctic islands north of 60° S
- Scientific Committee on Antarctic Research
