= Stewart Strait =

Stewart Strait (54°0′S 38°6′W) is a strait 2 nautical miles (3.7 km) wide between Bird Island and the Willis Islands, off the west end of South Georgia. The strait was navigated and charted by Captain James Cook in 1775; later called Willis Sound by sealers and whalers; recharted by DI in 1930 and named after Walter Stuart, Customs Officer in South Georgia at that time.
