= Bird Sound =

Body of water in Antarctica

Bird Sound (54°0′S 38°1′W) is a hazardous but navigable sound, 1 nautical mile (2 km) long and 0.5 nautical miles (1 km) wide, separating Bird Island from the west end of South Georgia. The names "La Roche Strait" and "Bird Sound" were used interchangeably for this feature on charts for many years. Bird Sound, which takes its name from nearby Bird Island, is approved on the basis of local usage.

Hornaday Rock lies within Bird Sound.
