= Cape Alexandra =

Cape Alexandra (54°0′S 38°0′W) is a cape which forms the northwest extremity of South Georgia. It was named "Cape North" in 1775 by a British expedition under James Cook, but this name has since become established for a cape 10 nautical miles (20 km) east-northeast which forms the northernmost point of South Georgia. The name Cape Alexandra dates back to about 1912 and commemorates Queen Alexandra, Consort of King Edward VII of the United Kingdom.
