= Index of South Georgia and the South Sandwich Islands–related articles =

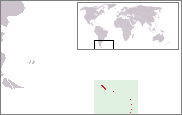
The location of the British Overseas Territory of South Georgia and the South Sandwich Islands

Articles related to the British Overseas Territory of South Georgia and the South Sandwich Islands include:

== 0–9 ==
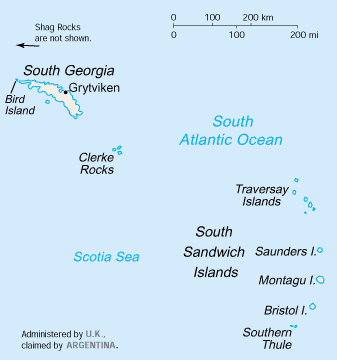
A map of South Georgia and the South Sandwich Islands

- .gs – Internet country code top-level domain for South Georgia and the South Sandwich Islands

== A ==
- Acorn Rock
- Americas
  - South America
    - South Atlantic Ocean
      - Islands of South Georgia and the South Sandwich Islands
- Anthony de la Roché
- Atlantic Ocean
- Atlas of South Georgia and the South Sandwich Islands
- Aurora Islands
- Austral thrush

== B ==
- Black-necked swan
- Blue petrel
- Brighton Beach (South Georgia)
- British Overseas Territory of South Georgia and the South Sandwich Islands
- Buff-necked ibis
- Busen Point

== C ==
The Coat of arms of South Georgia and the South Sandwich Islands

- Cape Rosa
- Capital of South Georgia and the South Sandwich Islands: King Edward Point on South Georgia Island
- Carl Anton Larsen
- Categories:
  - Category:South Georgia and the South Sandwich Islands
    - Category:Environment of South Georgia and the South Sandwich Islands
    - Category:Geography of South Georgia and the South Sandwich Islands
    - Category:History of South Georgia and the South Sandwich Islands
    - Category:Military of South Georgia and the South Sandwich Islands
    - Category:South Georgia and the South Sandwich Islands-related lists
    - Category:Communications and Broadcasting of South Georgia and South Sandwich Islands
  - commons:Category:South Georgia and the South Sandwich Islands
- Coat of arms of South Georgia and the South Sandwich Islands
- Commissioner for South Georgia and the South Sandwich Islands
- Commonwealth of Nations
- Communications in South Georgia and the South Sandwich Islands
- Compañía Argentina de Pesca
- Corbeta Uruguay
- Coscoroba swan
- Cinema in South Georgia and South Sandwich Islands

== D ==
- Demographics of South Georgia and the South Sandwich Islands
- Discovery Committee
- Discovery Investigations
- Ducloz Head
- Duncan Carse

== E ==
- Echo Pass
- Ems Rock
- English colonization of the Americas
- Ernesto Pass
- Esbensen Bay
- Evans Lake (South Georgia)

== F ==
The Flag of South Georgia and the South Sandwich Islands

- Flag of South Georgia and the South Sandwich Islands
- Flora of South Georgia
- Flying steamer duck
- Foreign relations of South Georgia and the South Sandwich Islands
- Framnaes Point
- Franklin's gull

== G ==
- Geography of South Georgia and the South Sandwich Islands
- Gjelstad Pass
- Godthul
- Gold Harbour
- Goldcrest Point
- Gony Point
- Grytviken
- Grytviken
- Gulbrandsen Lake
- Gull Lake, South Georgia

== H ==
- Hestesletten
- History of South Georgia and the South Sandwich Islands
- Husvik

== I ==
- Imperial Trans-Antarctic Expedition#South Georgia crossing
- International Organization for Standardization (ISO)
  - ISO 3166-1 alpha-2 country code for South Georgia and the South Sandwich Islands: GS
  - ISO 3166-1 alpha-3 country code for South Georgia and the South Sandwich Islands: SGS
- Islands of South Georgia and the South Sandwich Islands

== K ==
- King Edward Point on South Georgia Island – Capital of South Georgia and the South Sandwich Islands

== L ==
- Languages of South Georgia and the South Sandwich Islands
- Leith Harbour
- Lists related to South Georgia and the South Sandwich Islands:
  - List of islands of South Georgia and the South Sandwich Islands
  - List of mammals in South Georgia and the South Sandwich Islands
  - List of prominent South Georgians
  - List of South Georgia and the South Sandwich Islands-related topics
  - Topic outline of South Georgia and the South Sandwich Islands

== M ==
- Mammals of South Georgia and the South Sandwich Islands
- Military of South Georgia and the South Sandwich Islands

== O ==
- Ocean Harbour
- Operation Paraquet

== P ==
- Peggotty Bluff
- Politics of South Georgia and the South Sandwich Islands
- Possession Bay
- Prince Olav Harbour
- Prominent South Georgians
- Protector Shoal

== R ==
- Rosita Harbour
- Rosybill
- Radio Stations in South Georgia and South Sandwich Islands
- Radio South Georgia and South Sandwich Islands

== S ==
- Salisbury Plain, South Georgia
- Solveig Gunbjørg Jacobsen
- South American snipe
- South Georgia and the South Sandwich Islands
- South Georgia Museum
- South Georgia pipit
- Southern rough-winged swallow
- Sovereignty of South Georgia and the South Sandwich Islands
- Stromness, South Georgia
- Subantarctic
- Survey Isthmus

== T ==
- Teal Ponds
- Thatcher Peninsula
- Topic outline of South Georgia and the South Sandwich Islands

== U ==
- United Kingdom of Great Britain and Northern Ireland

== V ==
- Viktor Esbensen
- Voyage of the James Caird#South Georgia

== W ==
- White-crested elaenia
- Wikimedia Atlas of South Georgia and the South Sandwich Islands

== See also ==
- List of international rankings
- Lists of country-related topics
- Topic outline of geography
- Topic outline of South America
