= Lancing Glacier =

Glacier in Antarctica

- Location within South Georgia Island
- Location: South Georgia
- Coordinates: 54°20′S 36°56′W
- Length: 3 nmi (6 km; 3 mi)
- Thickness: unknown
- Terminus: Newark Bay
- Status: unknown

Lancing Glacier (54°20′S 36°56′W) is a glacier 3 nautical miles (6 km) long, flowing south from Mount Corneliussen and Smillie Peak to Newark Bay on the south side of South Georgia. It was surveyed by the South Georgia Survey in the period 1951–57, and named by the UK Antarctic Place-Names Committee for the Lancing (formerly Flackwell), built in 1898, and converted to a whale factory ship in 1923. It was the first factory ship to be fitted with a slipway.

== See also ==
- List of glaciers in the Antarctic
- Glaciology
