= Esbensen =

Esbensen is a surname. Notable people with the surname include:

- Mogens Bay Esbensen (born 1930), Danish chef and writer
- Viktor Esbensen (1881–1942), Norwegian explorer and whaler

== See also ==
- Esbensen Bay, a bay of South Georgia
