= Enern-class patrol vessel =

Class overview
- Name: Enern class
- Builders: Akers Mekaniske Verksted A/S, Oslo; Framnes Mekaniske Versted A/S, Sandefjord
- Operators: Royal Netherlands Navy
- In commission: 1940–1945 Royal Netherlands Navy
- Retired: 3

General characteristics
- Type: Auxiliary patrol boat whalers
- Displacement: 248 tons (Enern and Toern); 257 tons (Femern)
- Length: 35.23 m (115 ft 7 in)
- Beam: 7.24 m (23 ft 9 in)
- Draught: 1.20 m (3 ft 11 in)
- Propulsion: 1 × 776 ihp (579 kW) triple expansion engine (Enern); 1 × 775 ihp (578 kW) triple expansion engine (Femern); 1 × 765 ihp (570 kW) triple expansion engine (Toern)
- Speed: 10.5 knots (19.4 km/h)
- Complement: 15
- Sensors & processing systems: Asdic
- Armament: 1 × 75 mm (3.0 in) cannon; 2 × 7.7 mm (0.30 in) Lewis machine guns

After the start of World War II, the subsequent fall of the Netherlands left the country's overseas territories without significant naval forces for protection. The Dutch East Indies harboured the majority of the Royal Netherlands Navy, the "West Indies" including the Dutch Caribbean and Suriname only had the gunboat HNLMS Van Kinsbergen for protection between them.

In order to help with patrolling of these waters, three former Norwegian whalers were hired and militarized. These were HNLMS Enern, HNLMS Femern, and HNLMS Toern.

== Ships of class ==
Name	Construction yard	Completed	Fate
Enern	Akers Mekaniske Verksted A/S, Oslo	1929	Returned to owner once lease period ended 21 August 1945.
Femern	Framnes Mekaniske Versted A/S, Sandefjord	1932	Returned to owner once lease period ended 21 August 1945.
Toern	Akers Mekaniske Verksted A/S, Oslo	1929	Returned to owner once lease period ended 21 August 1945.

== Service history ==
All three ships had originally been part of a Norwegian whaling fleet with SS Solglimt as their factory ship. The fleet had not been in Norway during Operation Weserübung, but encountered the German auxiliary cruiser Pinguin in the South Atlantic where Solglimt was captured.

Enern, Femern, and Toern would thus be left without a factory ship and be made available for hire by their owner. All three were present at New Orleans making them ideal options for the Royal Netherlands Navy to hire them. The most notable event during the patrols these boats did was when Femern picked up eight survivors from the Norwegian tanker Lise which had been torpedoed and sunk by U-69 on 12 May 1942.

All three boats were returned to their owner on 21 August 1945.
