= Gjelstad Pass =

Mountain pass in South Georgia

Gjelstad Pass (54.2871°S 36.9633°W) is a pass through the western part of the Allardyce Range of South Georgia, between Mount Corneliussen and Smillie Peak. It is the only pass yet discovered which gives access overland to the area south of the Allardyce Range. It was surveyed by the South Georgia Survey in the period 1951–57, and was named by the UK Antarctic Place-Names Committee for A. Gjelstad, a Norwegian engineer and factory owner, who between 1926 and 1932 invented various devices of great practical value to the whaling industry, including the "whale-claw," an apparatus for grasping the tails of whales for hauling them up the slipways of factory ships.
