= SS Potsdam =

SS Potsdam may refer to:

- SS Potsdam (1899), passenger steamer for Holland America Line, 1900–1915; Stockholm for Swedish American Line, 1915–1929; Norwegian whale factory ship Solglimt, 1929–1940; following German invasion of Norway, became Sonderburg for the First German Whaling Company, 1940; scuttled in Cherbourg harbor, 1944; completely cleared from channel and scrapped by 1947
- SS Potsdam (1935), passenger steamer for North German Lloyd, 1935–1946; later British troopship, Pakistani pilgrimage ship; scrapped 1976
