= Mount Globus =

Mountain in South Georgia

Mount Globus (54°19′S 37°0′W) is a mountain, 1,270 metres (4,170 ft) high, between Fanning Ridge and Mount Corneliussen at the west end of the Allardyce Range of South Georgia. It was surveyed by the South Georgia Survey in the period 1951–57, and was named by the UK Antarctic Place-Names Committee for Hvalfangerselskapet Globus A/S, a Norwegian whaling company founded in 1924, which first used the plan patented by Petter Sorlle for processing whales in a factory ship fitted with a slipway.
