= Christensen Glacier (South Georgia) =

Glacier in South Georgia

- Location within South Georgia Island
- Location: South Georgia
- Coordinates: 54°20′S 36°52′W
- Length: 7 nmi (13 km; 8 mi)
- Thickness: unknown
- Terminus: Newark Bay
- Status: unknown

Christensen Glacier is a glacier 4 nautical miles (7 km) long, flowing south into the eastern part of Newark Bay on the south coast of South Georgia. It was surveyed by the South Georgia Survey in the period 1951–57, and named by the UK Antarctic Place-Names Committee for Chr. Fred. Christensen, Norwegian naval architect who, in cooperation with the shipowner H.G. Melsom, first solved the practical problems of building a slipway on a whale factory ship by converting the Lancing in 1925; he also made important improvements in the machinery for treatment and extraction of whale products.

== See also ==
- List of glaciers in the Antarctic
- Glaciology
