= Edmund Fanning =

Edmund Fanning may refer to:

- Edmund Fanning (colonial administrator) (1739–1818), American-born colonial administrator and military officer
- Edmund Fanning (explorer) (1769–1841), American explorer and sea captain
