= Aspasia Point =

Cape in South Georgia and the South Sandwich Islands

Aspasia Point (54°19′S 37°6′W) is a steep rocky headland forming the west extremity of Fanning Ridge, lying 10 miles (16 km) east-southeast of Cape Nuñez on the south coast of the island of South Georgia. It was named by the UK Antarctic Place-Names Committee following mapping by the South Georgia Survey in 1951–52. The name derives from association with Fanning Ridge, as the American armed corvette Aspasia under Captain Edmund Fanning took 57,000 fur seals at South Georgia in 1800–01.

== See also ==
- Storer Reef
