= Right Whale Bay =

Bay on the coast of South Georgia Island

Coordinates: 54°0′S 37°41′W

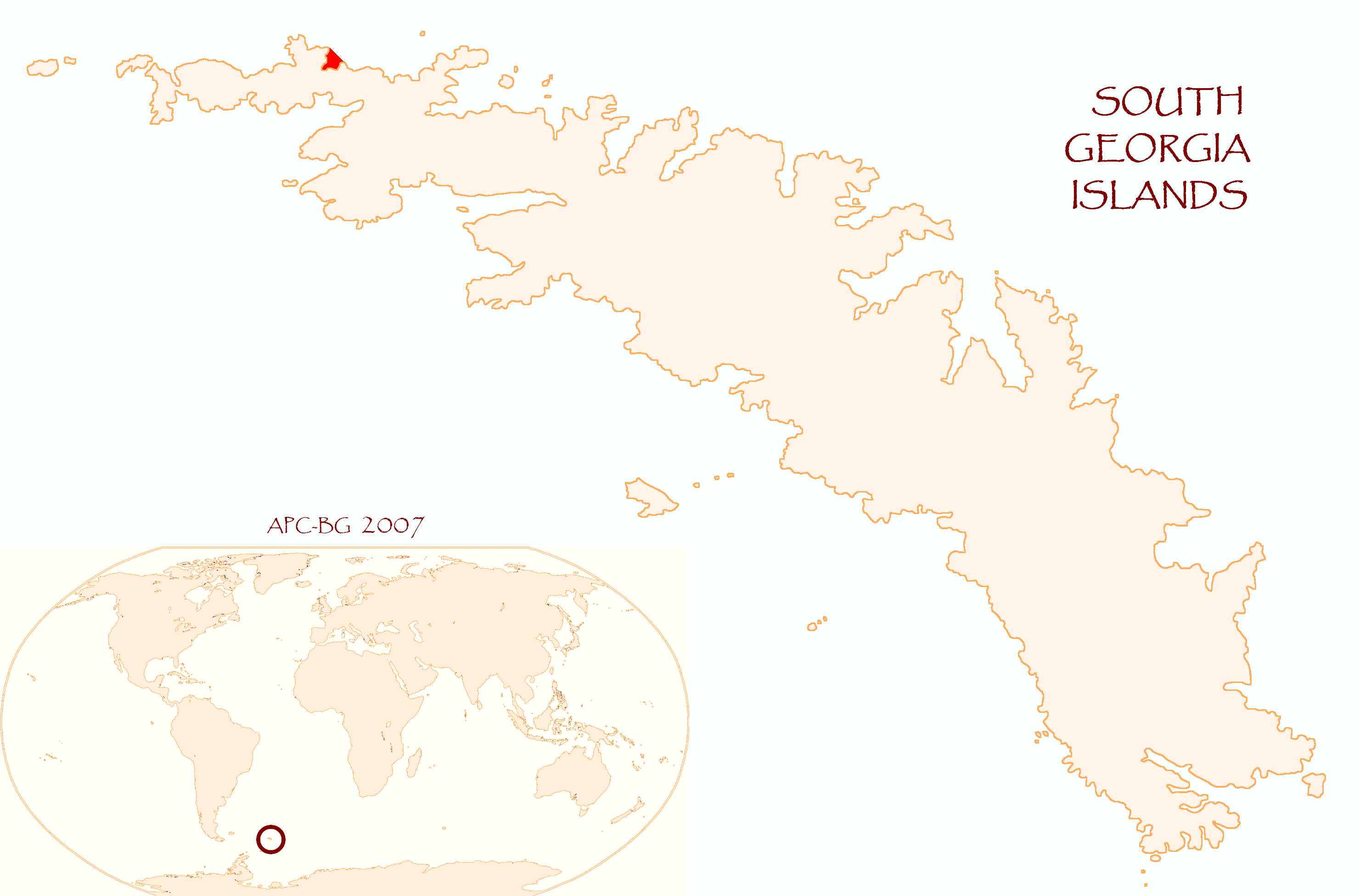
Location of Right Whale Bay on South Georgia Island

Right Whale Bay is a bay 1.5 miles (2.4 km) wide, entered between Craigie Point and Nameless Point along the north coast of South Georgia Island. The bay is named for the southern right whales found in the area. South Georgia has historically been well known for whaling. The bay is linked to Morsa Bay on the island's south coast by a mountain pass called Ernesto Pass.

== Notable features ==
The northwest side of the bay's entrance is called Nameless Point. It was charted and probably named by Discovery Investigations (DI) personnel in 1930.

Cairns Cove is a small cove on the west side of Right Whale Bay. It was charted and named Haste Cove by DI, but that name was withdrawn by the UK Antarctic Place-Names Committee (UK-APC) in 1959. Following a hydrographic survey from HMS Owen, 1960–61, the cove was named after Petty Officer Peter T. Cairns, a member of the survey group. Mount Regulator rises 655 m (2,149 ft) high and stands 1 nmi (1.9 km) inland to the west of Cairns Cove. Black Point is also on the west side of the bay.

Binder Beach is a moraine beach at the head of Right Whale Bay. The name first appeared on a chart based upon a survey by DI personnel in 1930. Bloor Reef, located off Binder Beach, dries with the tide. It was named by the UK-APC for Leading Seaman Vincent T. Bloor, who assisted in the survey of Right Whale Bay in April 1961.

Cairns Shoal is a small area of shoal lying 0.6 nautical miles (1.1 km) west of Craigie Point in the east part of Right Whale Bay. Like Cairns Cove, it was named by UK-APC for Petty Officer Peter T. Cairns.

Barber Cove is a small, rock-strewn cove in the bay's eastern part, bounded by Bluff Point to the west and Craigie Point to the east. It was initially named Scott Bay on a chart based upon a 1930 survey by DI personnel; the origin of this name is unknown. It was renamed Barber Cove by the UK-APC in 1963, for Leading Seaman John M. Barber of HMS Owen. The name Craigie Point is an established name dating back to about 1912. The name Bluff Point first appears on a DI chart.
