= Tawny Gap =

Tawny Gap (54°1′S 37°36′W) is a low pass extending across South Georgia from the head of Ice Fjord to a cove just south of Wales Head. The name was given by the United Kingdom Antarctic Place-Names Committee (UK-APC) following survey by the SGS in the period 1951-57 and is descriptive of the colorful vegetation in this small gap.
