= Comer Crag =

Comer Crag (54°1′S 37°38′W) is a crag, 635 metres (2,080 ft) high, standing 1 nautical mile (2 km) north of the head of Ice Fjord in the western part of South Georgia. It was surveyed by the South Georgia Survey in the period 1951–57, and named by the UK Antarctic Place-Names Committee for Captain George Comer of East Haddam, Connecticut, who made his first sealing visit to South Georgia in the topsail schooner Era in 1885.
