= Storer Reef =

Storer Reef (54°22′S 37°4′W) is an isolated reef lying 3 nautical miles (6 km) southeast of Aspasia Point and 1.5 nautical miles (2.8 km) off the south coast of South Georgia. Named by the United Kingdom Antarctic Place-Names Committee (UK-APC) following mapping by the SGS, 1951–52, for Captain Nathaniel Storer of New Haven, CT, who in 1801, built a small schooner on the coast of Patagonia, sailed her to South Georgia, and spent two seasons taking 45,000 fur seal skins.
