= USS Rijndam =

Dutch ocean liner that was a US troop ship in the First World War

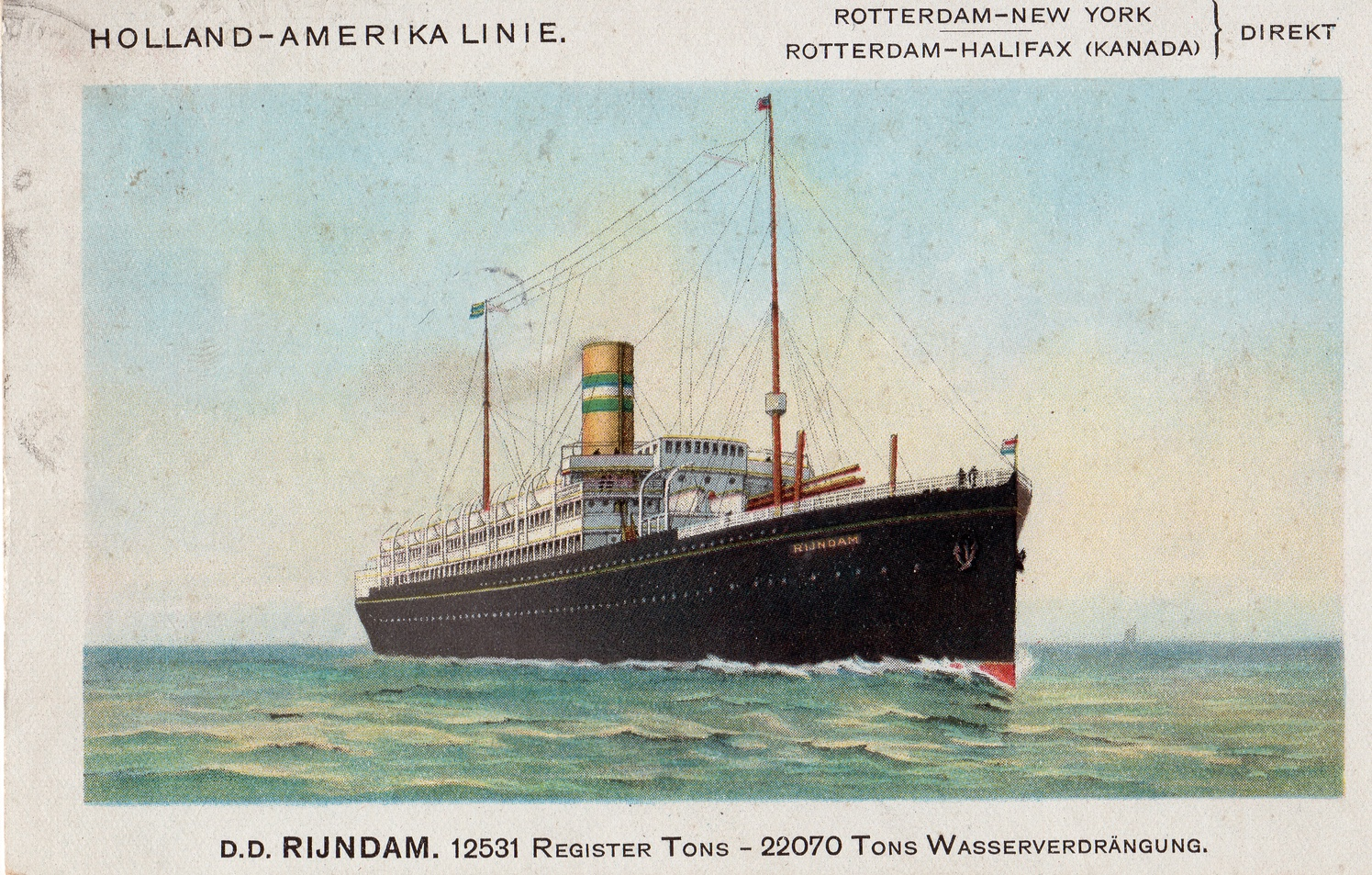
- Postcard of Rijndam in Holland America Line colours

History
- Name: Rijndam
- Owner: Holland America Line
- Operator: (United States) US Navy (1918–19)
- Port of registry: (Netherlands) Rotterdam
- Route: Rotterdam – New York
- Builder: Harland & Wolff, Belfast
- Yard number: 336
- Laid down: 23 November 1899
- Launched: 18 May 1901
- Completed: 3 October 1901
- Acquired: for US Navy, March 1918
- Commissioned: into US Navy, 1 May 1918
- Decommissioned: from US Navy, 22 October 1919
- Maiden voyage: 10 October 1901
- Refit: 1925, 1926
- Identification: code letters PRNB; by 1913: call sign MHY; 1914: call sign PED; 1918: ID number ID–2505
- Fate: Scrapped 1929

General characteristics
- Type: 1901: ocean liner; 1918: troopship
- Tonnage: 12,527 GRT, 7,976 NRT, 12,339 DWT
- Displacement: 23,650 tons
- Length: 560.7 ft (170.9 m) overall; 550.3 ft (167.7 m) registered
- Beam: 62.3 ft (19.0 m)
- Draft: 32 ft 3 1/2 in (9.84 m)
- Depth: 26.2 ft (8.0 m)
- Decks: 3
- Installed power: 1,265 NHP
- Propulsion: 2 × screws; 2 × triple-expansion engines
- Speed: 15 knots (28 km/h)
- Capacity: passengers: 1902: 286 × 1st class, 196 × 2nd class, 1,800 × 3rd class; 1925: cabin class & 3rd class only; 1926: cabin, tourist & 3rd class; cargo: 530,000 cubic feet (15,008 m^{3}) grain, 488,000 cubic feet (13,819 m^{3}) bale
- Troops: 3,000
- Complement: in US Navy, 636
- Sensors & processing systems: by 1910: submarine signalling
- Armament: in US Navy: 4 × 6-inch (150 mm) guns; 2 × 1-pounder guns; 2 × machine guns
- Notes: sister ships: Potsdam, Noordam

USS Rijndam (ID–2505) was the Holland America Line (HAL) ocean liner Rijndam, also spelt Ryndam, which was launched in Ireland in 1901 and scrapped in the Netherlands in 1929. The US requisitioned her as the United States Navy troopship USS Rijndam from 1918 until 1919. She was the first of four Holland America Line ships to be called Ryndam.

== Building ==
At the turn of the 20th century, Holland America Line's flagship was Potsdam, launched by Blohm+Voss in Hamburg in May 1899 and completed in May 1900. While she was being built, HAL ordered the first of two sister ships for her from Harland & Wolff in Belfast. Rijndam was laid down on 23 November 1899 as yard number 336, launched on 18 May 1901 and completed on 3 October that year. Harland & Wolff also built a third sister ship, Noordam, which was launched in September 1901 and completed in March 1902.

Rijndam's length overall was 560.7 ft (170.9 m) and her registered length was 550.3 ft (167.7 m). Her beam was 62.3 ft (19.0 m) and her depth was 26.2 ft (8.0 m). Her tonnages were 12,527 GRT, 7,976 NRT and 12,339 DWT. Her passenger accommodation had berths for 286 first class, 196 second class and 1,800 third class passengers. Her holds had capacity of 530,000 cubic feet (15,008 m^{3}) for grain or 488,000 cubic feet (13,819 m^{3}) for cargo in bales.

Rijndam had twin screws, each driven by a three-cylinder triple-expansion steam engine. The combined power of her twin engines was rated at 1,265 NHP. and gave her a speed of 15 knots (28 km/h).

Holland America Line registered Rijndam at Rotterdam. Her Dutch code letters were PRNB.

== Rijndam and Ryndam ==
"Rijn" is Dutch for "Rhine". HAL called the ship Rijndam, and registered her as such with Lloyd's Register. But H&W's internal records anglicised her name to Ryndam. When the Marconi Company equipped her for wireless telegraphy, it also listed her in its English-language publications as Ryndam. HAL adopted the anglicised spelling for later ships.

== Early career ==
Rijndam joined Potsdam on HAL's regular route between Rotterdam and New York via Boulogne. Rijndam left Rotterdam on her maiden voyage on the route on 10 October 1901. Noordam completed the trio when she began her maiden voyage in May 1902.

By 1910 Rijndam was equipped for submarine signalling, and the Marconi Company had equipped her for wireless telegraphy. By 1913 her wireless telegraph call sign was MHY, but by 1914 it had been changed to PED.

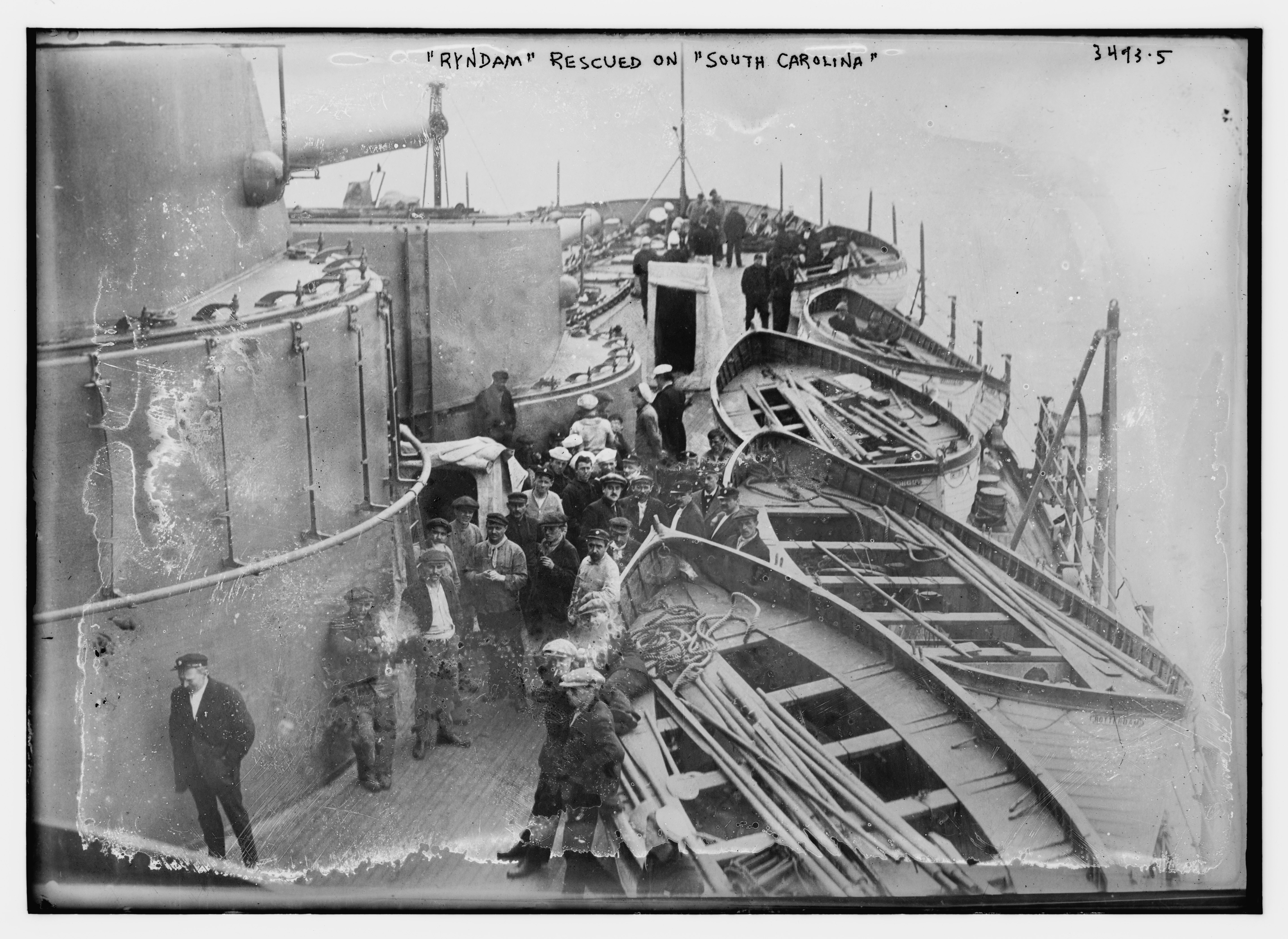
Boats and survivors from Rijndam aboard USS South Carolina in May 1915

On 25 May 1915 the Norwegian fruit ship Joseph J. Cuneo collided with Rijndam in fog about 10 nautical miles (19 km) south of Nantucket Shoals. The battleships USS Louisiana, Michigan, South Carolina and Texas answered her distress signal and rescued 78 passengers and 152 crew from Rijndam.

On 18 January 1916 a mine laid by UC-1 damaged Rijndam in the Thames Estuary. The US singer Alice Sjoselius was aboard. She reported that the lifeboats were lowered, and passengers donned lifejackets, but the ship was not abandoned. Rijndam was repaired, and on 15 April resumed transatlantic sailings.

== Troopship ==
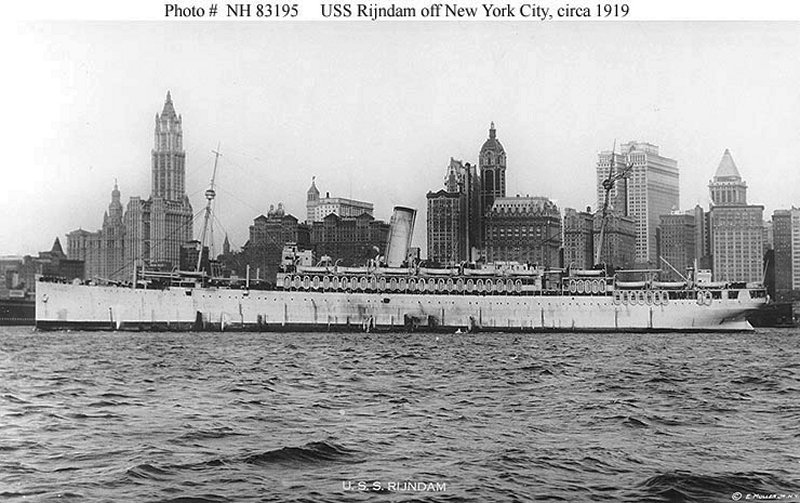
Rijndam as a troopship in 1919

On 6 April 1917 the US declared war against the Central Powers. The Netherlands were neutral in the First World War, but on 20 June 1917 the US detained Rijndam. She became one of 89 Dutch ships that the United States Customs Service seized under angary in March 1918. 31 of these were commissioned into the US Navy.

Rijndam was converted into a troopship, with capacity for up to 3,000 troops. Dozens of Carley floats were added to her lifesaving equipment. She was armed with four 6-inch (150 mm) guns, two 1-pounder guns, and two machine guns. She was commissioned on 1 May, with the ID number ID-2505, and commanded by Commander John J Hannigan.

As a troopship, Rijndam made 13 transatlantic round trips between the US and France: six before the Armistice of 11 November 1918 and seven afterward. Her first trip taking troops and supplies to France began from New York on 10 May 1918. She sailed in convoy with the US troopships Covington and President Lincoln, British troopship Dwinsk, and Italian troopships Caserta and Dante Alighieri. Shortly after sailing, the convoy merged with a contingent from Newport News comprising the US troopships Antigone, Lenape, Pastores, Princess Matoika, Susquehanna and Wilhelmina, Italian troopship Duca d'Aosta, and British troopship Kursk. Together the two contingents formed the 35th US convoy of the war. It was escorted by the cruiser USS Frederick. On 21 May, 11 destroyers relieved Frederick as escorts. On 24 May the convoy reached Brest.

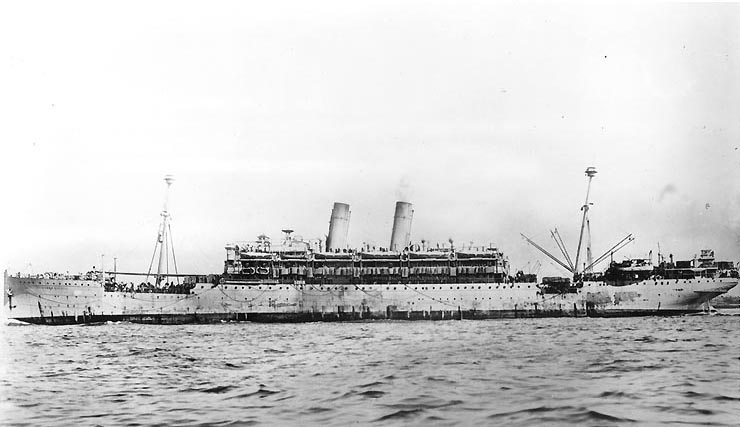
USS Princess Matoika made a number of transatlantic crossings with Rijndam, and the two ships raced each other from Saint-Nazaire to Newport News in March 1919

On 29 May Rijndam left Brest on her return voyage, in convoy with Antigone, President Lincoln, Susquehanna, and an escort of destroyers. At sunset the next day the destroyers detached, and the troopships continued unescorted. On the morning of 31 May, U-90 attacked the convoy. Three torpedoes sank President Lincoln. U-90 fired torpedoes at Rijndam, but the troopship took successful evasive action, and shortly afterward, nearly rammed a submarine cruising at periscope depth.

On 15 June 1918 Rijndam began her second trooping voyage to France. She left New York with the US troopships Covington, DeKalb, Finland, George Washington and Kroonland, Italian troopship Dante Alighieri and British troopship Vauban. They merged with a contingent from Newport News that included the US troopships Lenape, Pastores, Princess Matoika and Wilhelmina and British troopship Czar, to form a convoy to France. The cruisers Frederick and North Carolina and destroyers Fairfax and Stevens escorted them. The battleship Texas and several other destroyers joined the escort for a time. The convoy reached Brest on 27 June.

Rijndam landed troops and supplies at Brest on three more occasions until November 1918, and once at Quiberon in July. After the Armistice she repatriated US troops from Quiberon, Brest and Saint-Nazaire to Newport News, Norfolk, Virginia, Hoboken and New York.

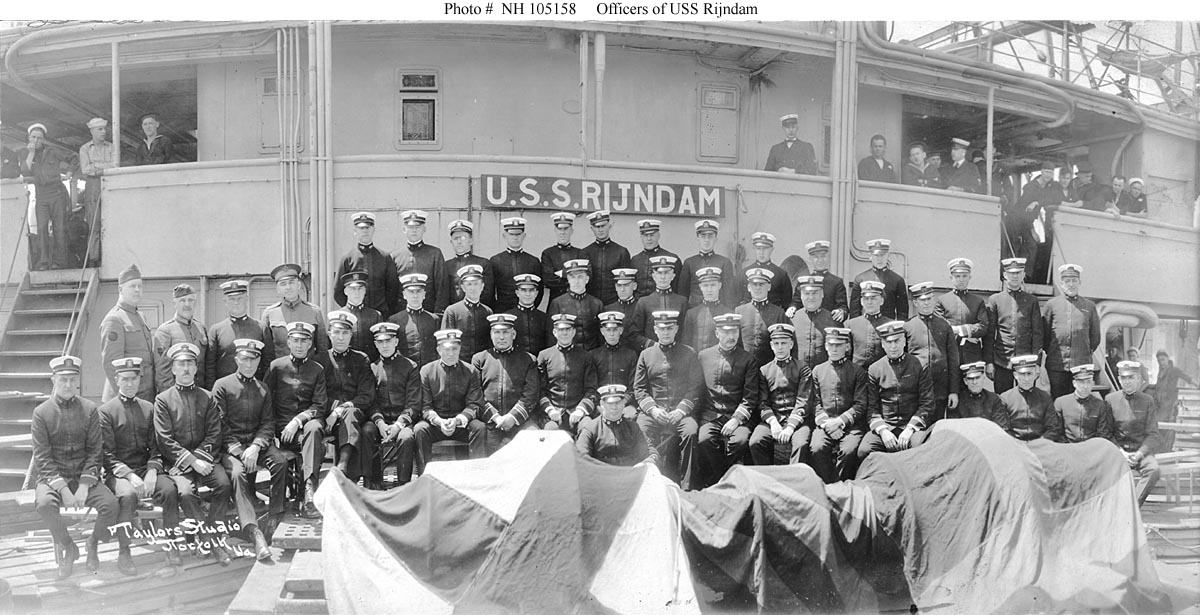
USS Rijndam's officers on deck, in port at Norfolk, Virginia

In March 1919 Princess Matoika and Rijndam raced each other from Saint-Nazaire to Newport News. Princess Matoika was the swifter ship, but Rijndam recruited volunteers from the 133rd Field Artillery Regiment aboard as extra stokers for her furnaces, and with their help she narrowly won the race.

Rijndam's final troop repatriation voyage was from Brest, and reached New York on 4 August 1919. On 11 August 1919 Rijndam was transferred from the Cruiser and Transport Force to the 3rd Naval District in New York. She was decommissioned, and on 22 October 1919 she was returned to her owners.

== Later career ==
On 31 July 1920 Rijndam returned to commercial service between Rotterdam and New York. In May 1925 she was refitted as a two-class ship, with cabin class replacing her first and second class accommodation. In May 1926 she reverted to being a three-class ship, but the classes were called cabin, tourist and third.

In 1926 and 1928, the ship served as the campus for the Floating University, a program that inspired what would become Semester at Sea.

On 16 April 1929 Rijndam left Rotterdam on her final voyage to New York. In May she was sold to Frank Rijsdijk's Industriëele Ondernemingen NV, which scrapped her at Hendrik-Ido-Ambacht.

== Bibliography ==
- Bonsor, NRP (1979). North Atlantic Seaway. Vol. 3. Jersey: Brookside Publications. ISBN 978-0-905824-02-4.
- Crowell, Benedict; Wilson, Robert Forrest (1921). The Road to France: The Transportation of Troops and Military Supplies, 1917–1918. How America Went to War: An Account From Official Sources of the Nation's War Activities, 1917–1920. New Haven, CT: Yale University Press. OCLC 18696066.
- Cutchins, John A; Stewart, George Scott Jr. (1921). History of the Twenty-ninth division, "Blue and gray," 1917-1919. Philadelphia: Press of MacCalla & Co. OCLC 3260003.
- Dowling, R (1909) [1903]. All About Ships & Shipping (3rd ed.). London: Alexander Moring Ltd.
- Ferguson, John C (2007). Historic Battleship Texas: The Last Dreadnought. Military History of Texas. Vol. 4. Abilene, TX: State House Press. ISBN 978-1-933337-07-4. OCLC 154678508.
- Gleaves, Albert (1921). A History of the Transport Service: Adventures and Experiences of United States Transports and Cruisers in the World War. New York: George H. Doran Company. OCLC 976757.
- Harlow, Rex F (1919). Trail of the 61st: A History of the 61st Field Artillery Brigade During the World War, 1917–1919. Oklahoma City: Harlow Publishing Co. OCLC 4227658.
- Lloyd's Register of British and Foreign Shipping. Vol. I.–Steamers. London: Lloyd's Register of Shipping. 1902 – via Internet Archive.
- Lloyd's Register of British and Foreign Shipping. Vol. I.–Steamers. London: Lloyd's Register of Shipping. 1910 – via Internet Archive.
- The Marconi Press Agency Ltd (1913). The Year Book of Wireless Telegraphy and Telephony. London: The St Katherine Press.
- The Marconi Press Agency Ltd (1914). The Year Book of Wireless Telegraphy and Telephony. London: The Marconi Press Agency Ltd.
- Office of Naval Records (1920). German submarine activities on the Atlantic coast of the United States and Canada. Washington, D.C.: United States Government Printing Office. OCLC 2211657.
- Pollard, James E (1919). The Forty-Seventh Infantry: A History, 1917–1918, 1919. Saginaw, MI: Press of Seeman & Peters. OCLC 3067517.
