= List of South Georgians =

The following is a list of people who were born, resided, or otherwise visited South Georgia Island for any amount of time and were notable in its history.

- Søren Berntsen
- E.B. Binnie
- Nigel Bonner
- Duncan Carse
- Jan Cheek
- Gerry Clark
- James Cook
- Anthony de la Roché
- Viktor Esbensen
- Wilhelm Filchner
- Georg Forster
- Solveig Gunbjörg Jacobsen
- Ludwig Kohl-Larsen
- Carl Anton Larsen
- Leonard Harrison Matthews
- Robert Cushman Murphy
- Sally Poncet
- Ernest Shackleton
