= Ryan Glacier =

Glacier in Antarctica

- Location within South Georgia Island
- Location: South Georgia
- Coordinates: 54°3′S 37°36′W
- Length: 2 nmi (4 km; 2 mi)
- Thickness: unknown
- Terminus: Ice Fjord
- Status: unknown

Ryan Glacier (54°3′S 37°36′W) is a glacier, 2 nautical miles (3.7 km) long, flowing west to the head of Ice Fjord, South Georgia. The German Antarctic Expedition (1911–12) named this glacier for Dr. Albrecht Penck, though an incorrect spelling "Penk" appeared on published maps. A number of significant Antarctic features, including a glacier, are named for Albrecht Penck. To avoid confusion of these names the United Kingdom Antarctic Place-Names Committee (UK-APC) recommended in 1957 that this feature be renamed. Ryan Glacier is named for Alfredo R.L. Ryan, president since 1946 of the Compañía Argentina de Pesca, which operated the whaling station at Grytviken.

== See also ==
- List of glaciers in the Antarctic
- Glaciology
