= Black Point (South Georgia) =

Cape in South Georgia and the South Sandwich Islands

Black Point (54°0′S 37°42′W) is a point on the west side of Right Whale Bay, 1.4 nautical miles (2.6 km) south-southwest of Nameless Point on the north coast of South Georgia. Charted and named by DI personnel in 1930.
