= Alice Sjoselius =

American singer (1888–1982)

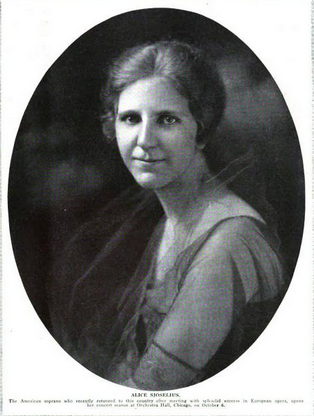
Alice Sjoselius, from a 1918 publication

Alice Sjoselius (June 25, 1888 – December 10, 1982) was an American soprano.

== Early life ==
Alice Margaret Sjoselius was born in Duluth, Minnesota, the daughter of Peter Adolph Sjoselius and Sara Bergman Sjoselius. Both of her parents were born in Sweden, and both died in 1935, from accidental carbon monoxide poisoning at home.

Sjoselius trained as a singer with Anna Eugénie Schoen-René.

== Career ==
Sjoselius was performing concerts in Minnesota by 1909. On her way to Germany in 1916, she was on the steamship Ryndam when it struck a mine near the coast of England. She had been studying voice and singing opera in Germany for several years when the United States entered World War I. When she returned to America, she sang at fundraisers for the war effort, including on the steps of the United States Department of the Treasury building in Washington, D. C. Sjoselius made her New York debut at Aeolian Hall in 1918, singing Swedish folksongs as part of her program. Also in 1918, she was engaged to sing a benefit concert for the Swedish Old People's Home in Evanston, Illinois. However, her 1918 tour was suspended on medical advice. She returned to Europe in 1919, to sing at the American Cathedral in Paris, and received a medal for her artistic services.

Sjoselius performed through the 1920s and 1930s, in the United States and in Europe. Later in life she taught voice in Duluth.

== Personal life ==
Sjoselius died in 1982, aged 94 years.
