= SS Noordam =

Dutch ocean liner built in Ireland & chartered to Sweden

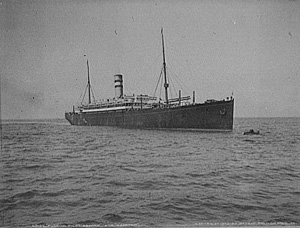
- Noordam picking up a pilot in 1903.

History
- Name: 1902: Noordam; 1923: Kungsholm; 1925: Noordam
- Owner: Holland America Line
- Operator: 1923–25: Rederi AB Sverige-Nordamerika
- Port of registry: 1902: (Netherlands) Rotterdam; 1923: (Sweden) Gothenburg; 1925: (Netherlands) Rotterdam
- Route: 1902: Rotterdam – New York; 1923: Gothenburg – New York; 1926: Rotterdam – New York
- Builder: Harland & Wolff, Belfast
- Yard number: 338
- Launched: 28 September 1901
- Completed: 29 March 1902
- Maiden voyage: 1 May 1902
- Refit: 1923
- Identification: 1902: code letters PMVL; by 1913: call sign MHA; 1914: call sign PAI
- Fate: Scrapped 1928–29

General characteristics
- Type: ocean liner
- Tonnage: 12,531 GRT, 7,978 NRT, 12,339 DWT
- Length: 560.7 ft (170.9 m) overall; 550.3 ft (167.7 m) registered
- Beam: 62.3 ft (19.0 m)
- Draught: 32 ft 1 in (9.78 m)
- Depth: 26.2 ft (8.0 m)
- Decks: 3
- Installed power: 1,265 NHP, 7,600 ihp
- Propulsion: 2 × screws; 2 × triple-expansion engines
- Speed: 15 knots (28 km/h)
- Capacity: passengers: 1902: 286 × 1st class, 292 × 2nd class, 1,800 × 3rd class; 1923: 478 × cabin class, 1,800 × 3rd class; 1926: 3rd class only; cargo: 530,000 cubic feet (15,008 m^{3}) grain, 488,000 cubic feet (13,819 m^{3}) bale
- Sensors & processing systems: by 1911: submarine signalling
- Notes: sister ships: Potsdam, Rijndam

SS Noordam was a steam ocean liner that was launched in Ireland in 1901 and scrapped in the Netherlands in 1928–29. Holland America Line owned her throughout her career. From 1923 to 1924 Rederi AB Sverige-Nordamerika chartered her and renamed her Kungsholm.

She was the first of four Holland America Line ships to be called Noordam, and the first of four Swedish liners to be called Kungsholm.

== Building ==
At the turn of the 20th century, Holland America Line's flagship was Potsdam, launched by Blohm+Voss in 1899 and completed in 1900. In 1901 and 1902 Harland & Wolff in Belfast built a pair of sister ships for her. Rijndam was launched in May 1901 and completed that October. Noordam was built on slipway number 5 as yard number 338, launched on 28 September 1901 and completed on 29 March 1902.

Noordam's length overall was 560.7 ft (170.9 m) and her registered length was 550.3 ft (167.7 m). Her beam was 62.3 ft (19.0 m) and her depth was 26.2 ft (8.0 m). Her tonnages were 12,531 GRT, 7,978 NRT and 12,339 DWT. Her passenger accommodation had berths for 286 first class, 292 second class and 1,800 third class passengers. Her holds had capacity of 530,000 cubic feet (15,008 m^{3}) for grain or 488,000 cubic feet (13,819 m^{3}) for cargo in bales.

Noordam had twin screws, each driven by a three-cylinder triple-expansion steam engine. The combined power of her twin engines was rated at 1,265 NHP or 7,600 ihp, and gave her a speed of 15 knots (28 km/h).

Holland America Line registered Noordam at Rotterdam. Her Dutch code letters were PMVL.

== Career ==
The regular route of Potsdam, Rijndam and Noordam was between Rotterdam and New York via Boulogne. Noordam left Rotterdam on her maiden voyage on the route on 1 May 1902.

By 1910 Noordam was equipped for submarine signalling, and the Marconi Company had equipped her for wireless telegraphy. By 1913 her wireless telegraph call sign was MHA, but by 1914 it had been changed to PAI.

On 24 November 1911, in fog the English Channel off the Isle of Wight, the schooner Alida collided with Noordam. Alida suffered only a broken bowsprit, and both ships continued their voyages.

At 11:40 hrs on 14 April 1912, Noordam's Marconi wireless telegraphist transmitted a warning of sea ice. The Cunard Liner RMS Caronia relayed the message to RMS Titanic. Titanic replied that she "had experienced moderate, variable weather".

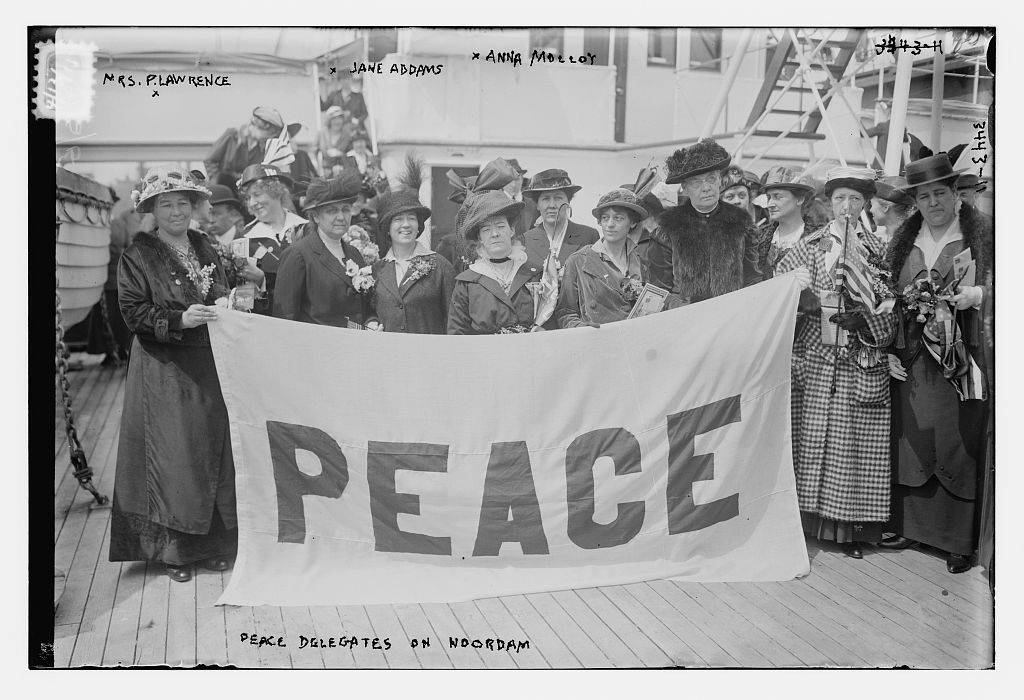
US and UK delegates aboard Noordam in 1915 on their way to the International Congress of Women at The Hague. They include Jane Addams and Annie E. Molloy.

On 17 October 1914 Noordam was returning from New York to Rotterdam. She had passed The Downs and was about 80 nautical miles (150 km) off the Hook of Holland when she struck a British mine. Her stern was badly damaged, but she reached the Nieuwe Waterweg safely.

On 3 March 1916 the British collier Swiftsure collided with Noordam off Dover. Swiftsure's bow was bent and her forepeak was flooded, but she reached Dover safely.

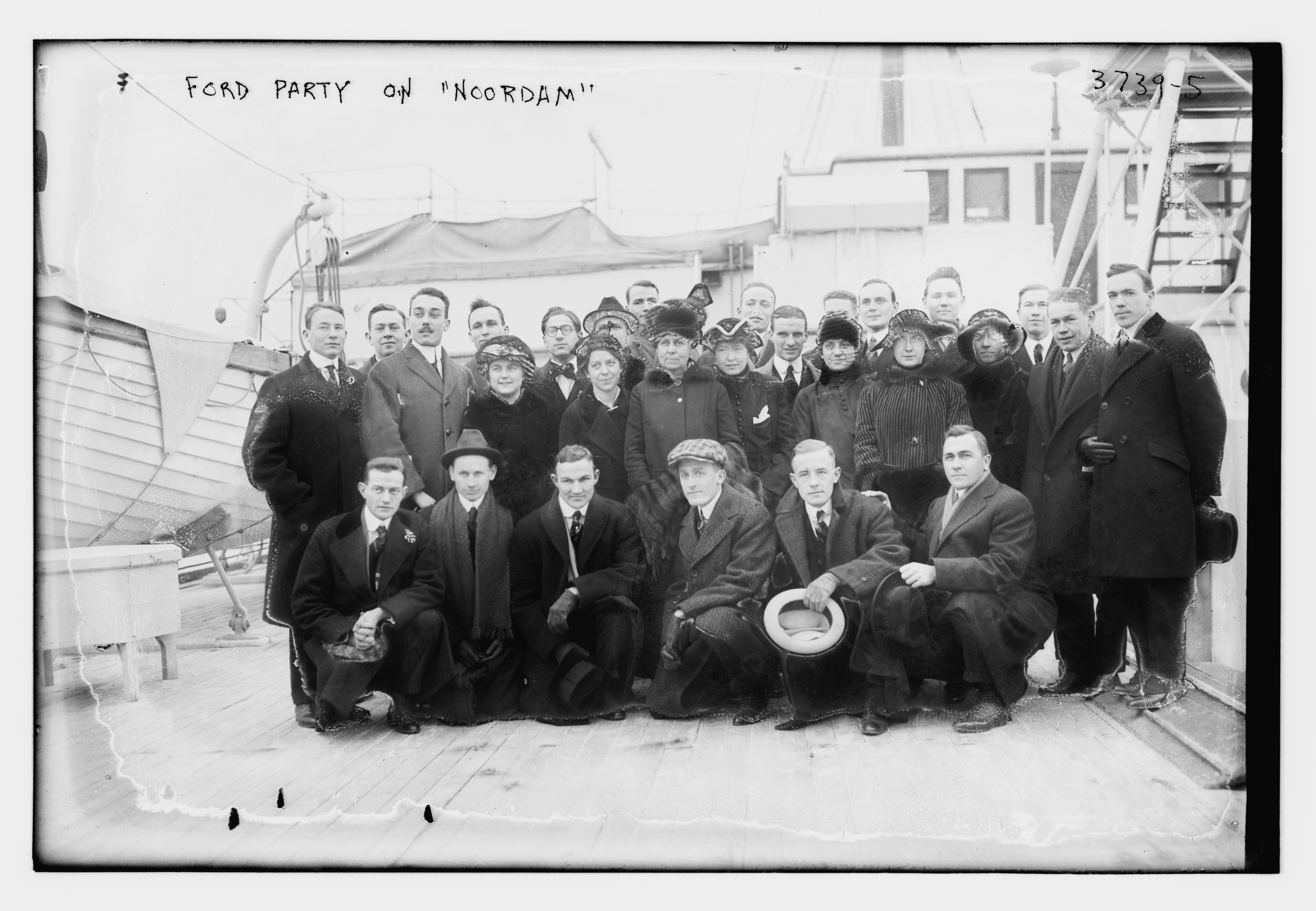
Members of the Henry Ford Peace Mission aboard Noordam in 1916

On 3 August 1917 Noordam was en route from Halifax, Nova Scotia to Rotterdam when she struck a mine in the North Sea off Terschellingbank. Her 237 passengers were transferred to the tugs Thames and Samson.

In March 1923 Rederi AB Sverige-Nordamerika bareboat chartered Noordam, renamed her Kungsholm and registered her in Gothenburg. She was refitted as a two-class ship, replacing her first and second class accommodation with berths for 478 cabin class passengers. In December 1924 Kungsholm was returned to her owners, who restored her original name.

In December 1925 Noordam was laid up in Rotterdam. She returned to service on 6 October 1926. From December 1926 she carried only third class passengers. She began her last voyage from Rotterdam to New York on 16 April 1927.

In May 1928 Holland America Line sold Noordam for scrap to NV Frank Rijsdijkʼs Industriëele Ondernemingen, who started demolishing her in Rotterdam. In June 1928 she was towed to Hendrik-Ido-Ambacht, where her breaking continued, and was completed in the final quarter of 1929.

== Bibliography ==
- Dowling, R (1909) [1903]. All About Ships & Shipping (3rd ed.). London: Alexander Moring Ltd.
- Lloyd's Register of British and Foreign Shipping. Vol. I.–Steamers. London: Lloyd's Register of Shipping. 1903 – via Internet Archive.
- Lloyd's Register of British and Foreign Shipping. Vol. I.–Steamers. London: Lloyd's Register of Shipping. 1910 – via Internet Archive.
- Lloyd's Register of Shipping. Vol. II.–Steamers and Motor Vessels. London: Lloyd's Register of Shipping. 1923 – via Internet Archive.
- The Marconi Press Agency Ltd (1913). The Year Book of Wireless Telegraphy and Telephony. London: The St Katherine Press.
- The Marconi Press Agency Ltd (1914). The Year Book of Wireless Telegraphy and Telephony. London: The Marconi Press Agency Ltd.
