= Ice Fjord =

- Location within South Georgia Island
- Location: South Georgia and the South Sandwich Islands
- Coordinates: 54°3′S 37°41′W
- Ocean/sea sources: Southern Atlantic Ocean
- Basin countries: South Georgia
- Max. length: 5.5 miles (9 km)
- Max. width: 2 miles (3 km)

Ice Fjord is a bay 5.5 miles (9 km) long and 2 miles (3 km) wide, entered between Weddell Point and Kade Point along the south coast and near the west end of the island of South Georgia. The name is well established, dating back to about 1920. A number of features along the bay's coast, including several smaller bays, have been charted and named.

During a visit to South Georgia in 1911–12, Scottish geologist David Ferguson named two bays within Ice Fjord as North and South Bays. Since both of these names were well established for the two arms of Prince Olav Harbor, the bays were renamed in 1957 by United Kingdom Antarctic Place-Names Committee (UK-APC). 1.5 nmi (2.8 km; 1.7 mi) wide North Bay was renamed Narval Bay after the whale catcher Narval, while South Bay was renamed Miles Bay, after the whale catcher Don Miles, both of which were owned by the Compañía Argentina de Pesca.

Morsa Bay is a small bay 2.5 nautical miles (5 km) east of Weddell Point, first surveyed by the South Georgia Survey in the period 1951–57, and named by the UK-APC for the whale catcher Morsa, owned by the Compañía Argentina de Pesca.

Ryan Glacier flows west across South Georgia to the head of Ice Fjord. Comer Crag stands 1 nautical mile (2 km) north of the head of Ice Fjord. Tawny Gap extends across South Georgia from the head of Ice Fjord to a cove just south of Wales Head.
