= Fanning Ridge =

Rock ridge in South Georgia Island

Fanning Ridge (54°20′S 37°2′W) is a prominent rock ridge, 5 nautical miles (9 km) long, paralleling the south coast of South Georgia between Aspasia Point and the west side of Newark Bay. The ridge was named by the UK Antarctic Place-Names Committee, following its mapping by the South Georgia Survey in 1951–52, for Captain Edmund Fanning of Stonington, CT, who with the Aspasia took 57,000 fur seal skins at South Georgia in 1800–01, and published the earliest account of sealing there.
