= Mogens Bay Esbensen =

Danish-born chef and author (born 1930)

Mogens Bay Esbensen (born 1930) is a Danish-born chef and author who is widely credited with introducing Thai cuisine and ingredients to Australia, and is considered a pioneer of Modern Australian cuisine. He operated La Causerie, Pavilion on the Park, Butler's and The Old Bank restaurants in Sydney and Nautilus in Cairns. He left Australia in 1992 and was profiled in 2001 as living on the island of Læsø, halfway between Sweden and Denmark.

== Career ==
Esbensen was born on a farm 60 km south of Copenhagen in 1930. He started cooking at age 4, and at age 15 trained as a chef under Ejler Jørgensen, a famous Copenhagen chef and restaurateur. At age 22, he was executive chef at the Hotel de France. In order to travel he joined Scandinavian Airline Systems (SAS) as a flight steward, where he cooked in-flight meals. In 1959, he was posted to Bangkok, Thailand, returning to Denmark at the end of his one-year posting.

He returned to Bangkok to take up a position of food and beverage manager at the Rama Hotel, attempted to set up a floating hotel in Hong Kong, and later was involved in setting up an international resort at Pattaya. In 1965, Esbensen opened his first restaurant called Two Vikings, and in 1972 sold his interest to his business partner in order to establish an orchid farm near Pattaya, but the venture failed, and he lost his life savings. Two years later he became a consultant to the Bangkok Hyatt Hotel, and it was while on a promotional trip to the Hyatt Kingsgate Kings Cross that he decided to relocate to Sydney Australia. He began by operating a small restaurant, La Causerie, before becoming head chef of Pavilion on the Park in 1976. The restaurant, which he ran with chef Damien Pignolet, became very popular and was a financial success, netting nearly $1 million in one year.

Esbensen began by cooking French cuisine, but later introduced Thai dishes based on his 17 years living in Bangkok. He purchased Butler's in 1979 where he introduced an international menu, although the restaurant was predominantly known as a French Restaurant. He demanded then unknown Thai ingredients fish sauce, lemon grass, gingers, Thai eggplants, and tropical fruits of Sydney suppliers, and eventually these became available. While on holiday in Port Douglas, Far North Queensland, in the early 1980s, Esbensen purchased the Nautilus restaurant and ran this at the same time as Butler's. It was at Nautilus that he became famous for his Thai cuisine. In 1986 he wrote the influential Thai Cuisine, and in 1988 A Taste of the Tropics: the Delights of Australian Tropical Fruit published by Viking O'Neil, and both out of print. By 1989 Esbensen had sold Nautilus and returned to Sydney to concentrate on Butler's.

== Later life ==
Esbensen was initially very successful as an owner chef and, in the 1990s, built a tropical house on 7 acres of rainforest near Cardwell in Far North Queensland. However, by 1990, a combination of financial issues associated with Butler and a chronic illness which prevented him from working caused his financial collapse. Successful surgery came too late to prevent the loss of both the restaurant and his house, and he left Australia in 1992.

Curious about Esbensen's fate, the Australian food critic Stephen Downes set out to find him in 2001. Downes tracked Esbensen down to the remote island of Læsø where he conducted a series of interviews which were later included in a book titled Advanced Australian Fare published by Allen & Unwin in 2002.

== Books ==
- A Taste of the Tropics: the Delights of Australian Tropical Fruit by Mogens Bay Esbensen. 1988 edition published by Viking O'Neil ISBN 978-0-670-90120-3
- Advanced Australian Fare: How Australian Cooking Became The World's Best by Stephen Downes. Published by Allen & Unwin 2002 ISBN 978-1-86508-581-4
