= Ernesto Pass =

Mountain pass in South Georgia

Ernesto Pass (54°1′S 37°44′W) is a mountain pass between Morsa Bay and Right Whale Bay in the northwest part of South Georgia. The name "Don Ernesto Glacier", for the catcher Don Ernesto owned by the Compañía Argentina de Pesca, was used for a glacier in the area on a British Admiralty chart in 1931. The South Georgia Survey, 1955–56, reported that the glacier is now vestigial and no longer reaches the sea, but that the pass requires a name. The form Ernesto Pass was recommended by the UK Antarctic Place-Names Committee in 1957.
