= SS Potsdam (1899) =

Steamship built in 1899

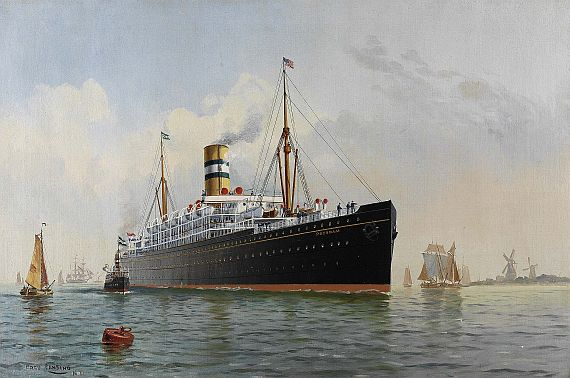
- Painting of Potsdam in about 1910

History
- Name: 1900: Potsdam; 1915: Stockholm; 1928: Solglimt; 1941: Sonderburg
- Namesake: 1900: Potsdam; 1915: Stockholm; 1928: Norwegian for "sunshine"; 1941: Sonderburg
- Owner: 1900: Holland America Line; 1915: Swedish American Line; 1928: Hvalfangerstakjeselskabet 'Atlas'; 1930: A/S Odd; 1941: Kriegsmarine
- Operator: 1928: Christian Nielsen & Co; 1930: A/S Thor Dahl; 1941: Erste Deutsche Wahlfang Ges; 1942: Trossschiffverband
- Port of registry: 1900: (Netherlands) Rotterdam; 1915: (Sweden) Gothenburg; 1928: (Norway) Larvik; 1929: (Norway) Sandefjord; 1941: (Nazi Germany) Hamburg
- Route: 1900: Rotterdam – New York; 1915: Gothenburg – New York
- Builder: Blohm+Voss
- Yard number: 139
- Laid down: 4 May 1899
- Launched: 15 December 1899
- Completed: 5 May 1900
- Maiden voyage: 17 May 1900
- Refit: 1928
- Identification: 1900: code letters PQLF; by 1913: call sign MHM; 1914: call sign PEE; 1915: code letters JVMC; by 1918: call sign SGL; 1928: code letters LHNB; by 1934: call sign LDMD
- Nickname(s): "Funneldam"
- Fate: scuttled 1944, partly blown up 1946, raised and scrapped 1947

General characteristics
- Type: 1900: ocean liner; 1928: whaling factory ship
- Tonnage: 1900: 12,606 GRT, 8,018 NRT, 12,649 DWT; 1930: 12,279 GRT, 7,123 NRT
- Length: 573.0 ft (174.65 m) overall; 550.0 ft (167.6 m) registered
- Beam: 62.0 ft (18.9 m)
- Draught: 31 ft 10 in (9.70 m)
- Depth: 34.6 ft (10.5 m)
- Decks: 3
- Installed power: 1,355 NHP, 7,600 ihp
- Propulsion: 2 × screws; 2 × triple-expansion engines
- Speed: 15 knots (28 km/h)
- Capacity: passengers, 1900: 282 × 1st class, 208 × 2nd class, 1,800 × 3rd class; cargo: 612,000 cubic feet (17,330 m^{3}) grain, 559,000 cubic feet (15,829 m^{3}) bale
- Crew: 186
- Sensors & processing systems: by 1910: submarine signalling; by 1930: wireless direction finding
- Notes: sister ships: Rijndam, Noordam

SS Potsdam was a steam ocean liner that was launched in Germany in 1899 for Holland America Line.

In 1915, Swedish American Line acquired her and renamed her Stockholm. In 1929, the ship was acquired by Norwegians, who had it converted into a whaling factory ship, and renamed her Solglimt. In 1941, a German auxiliary cruiser captured her and she was renamed Sonderburg. She was scuttled in 1944, and raised and scrapped in 1947.

When new, Potsdam was the largest ship in the Holland America Line fleet. She was the only Holland America Line ship ever to be named after the German city of Potsdam. She was the first of four Swedish American liners to be named after the Swedish capital city Stockholm.

== Building ==
Blohm+Voss built Potsdam in Hamburg as yard number 139. She was laid down on 4 May 1899, launched on 15 December 1899 and completed on 5 May 1900. Her length overall was 573.0 ft (174.65 m) and her registered length was 550.0 ft (167.6 m). Her beam was 62.0 ft (18.9 m) and her depth was 34.6 ft (10.5 m). Her tonnages were 12,606 GRT, 8,018 NRT and 12,649 DWT. Her passenger accommodation had berths for 282 first class, 208 second class and 1,800 third class passengers. Her holds had cubic capacity of 612,000 cubic feet (17,330 m^{3}) for grain and 559,000 cubic feet (15,829 m^{3}) for cargo in bales.

Potsdam had twin screws, each driven by a three-cylinder triple-expansion steam engine. The combined power of her twin engines was rated at 1,355 NHP or 7,600 ihp, and gave her a speed of 15 knots (28 km/h).

== Potsdam ==
Holland America Line registered Potsdam at Rotterdam. Her Dutch code letters were PQLF.

Her regular route was between Rotterdam and New York via Boulogne. She began her maiden voyage on 17 May 1900.

At first, Potsdam's speed was unsatisfactory, and she was found not to steam well enough. In her winter overhaul of 1900 to 1901 her funnel was increased in height by 23 feet (7.0 m) to improve the draught through her furnaces and boilers. The modification succeeded in improvingher steaming and her speed. Her taller funnel earnt her the nickname "Funneldam".

Holland America Line ordered two sister ships for Potsdam, built by Harland & Wolff in Ireland. Rijndam was launched in May 1901 and completed that October. Noordam was launched in September 1901 and completed in March 1902.

By 1910 Potsdam was equipped for submarine signalling, and the Marconi Company had equipped her for wireless telegraphy. By 1913 her wireless telegraph call sign was MHM, but by 1914 it had been changed to PEE.

On 15 April 1912 White Star Line's RMS Titanic sank with the loss of 1,517 lives. Under public scrutiny after the disaster, other companies admitted that their passenger ships carried too few lifeboats. Holland America Line was one of them, and the company duly had two more pairs of lifeboats installed aboard Potsdam, positioned aft on a deckhouse.

Early the First World War, the ship's name and home port "Potsdam Rotterdam" were painted on her side in large capital letters to identify her as a neutral ship. But passenger numbers declined, and Holland America Line laid Potsdam up in Rotterdam and advertised her for sale.

== Stockholm ==
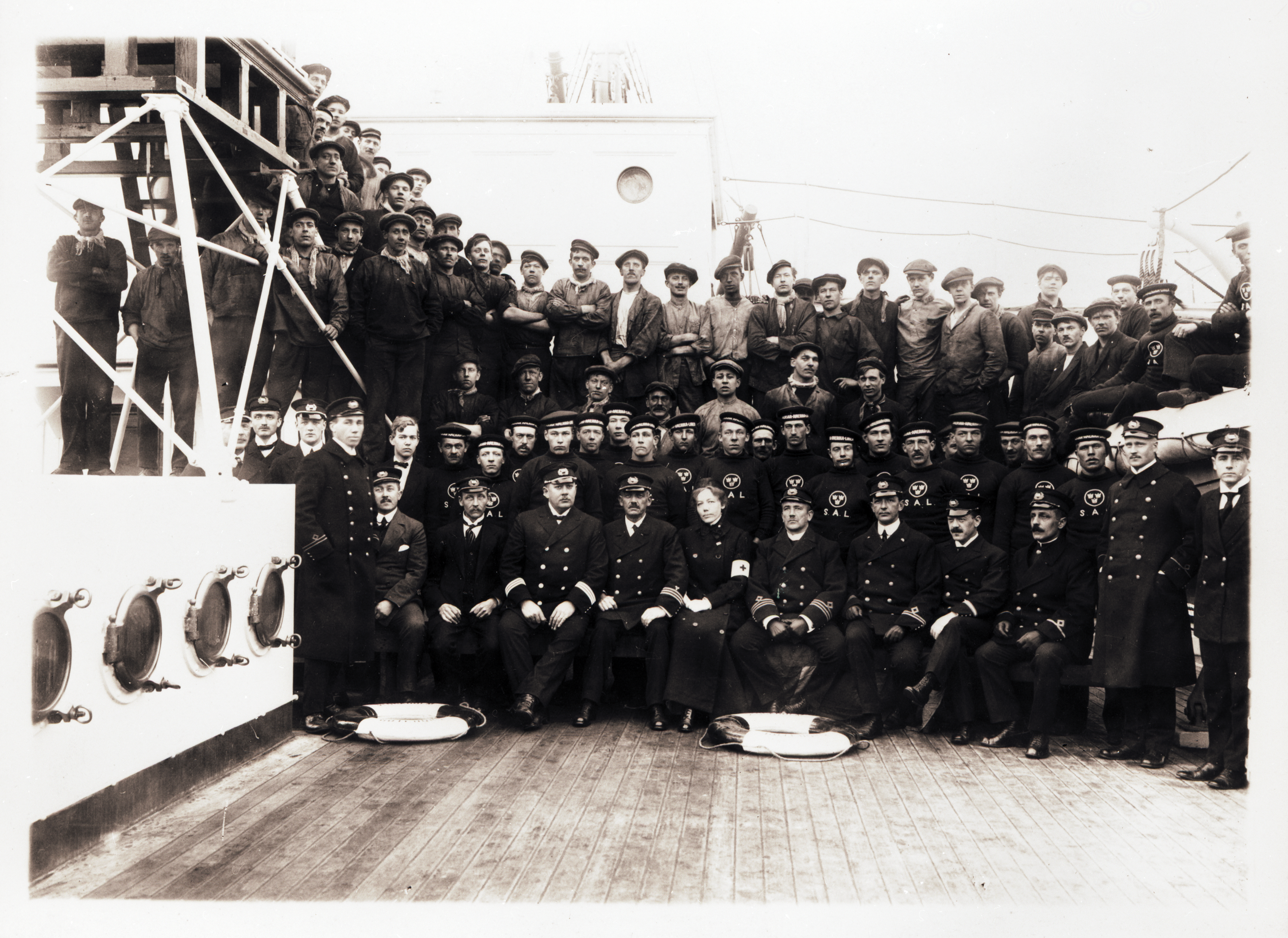
Part of Stockholm's crew on deck in Gothenburg in 1915

In September 1915 Swedish America Line acquired Potsdam, renamed her Stockholm, and registered her in Gothenburg. Her passenger accommodation was improved, particularly in Third Class, to appeal to Swedish emigrants to the USA. Her Swedish code letters were JVMC, and by 1918 her call sign was SGL. She began her first voyage from Gothenburg to New York on 11 December 1915.

At first Stockholm prospered. However, on 1 February 1917 the Imperial German Navy resumed unrestricted submarine warfare. This increased the danger for neutral shipping, so Stockholm was laid up in Gothenburg from May 1917 until June 1918.

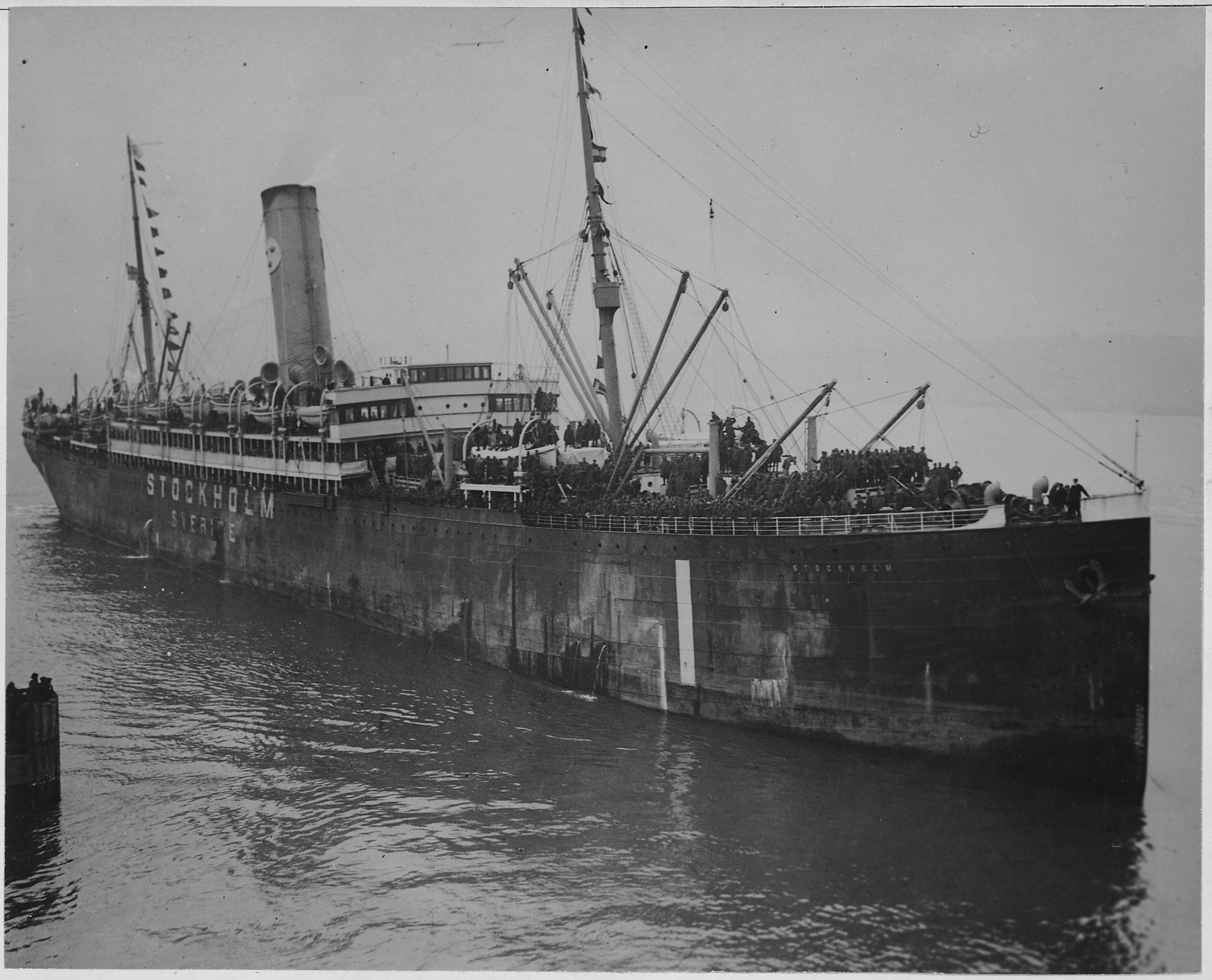
Stockholm arriving in New York in 1919, repatriating members of the 369th Infantry Regiment. Note the lettering "Stockholm Sverige" on her side, identifying her as a neutral ship in the First World War.

In 1919 the United States chartered Stockholm to repatriate troops from France. She brought 1,000 members of the Afro-American 369th Infantry Regiment home from Europe to New York.

In 1922 Götaverken converted Stockholm from coal to heavy fuel oil. This improved the performance of her furnaces and boilers, so the height of her funnel was reduced by 7 feet (2 m).

Stockholm began her final transatlantic voyage for Swedish American Line on 29 September 1928.

== Solglimt ==
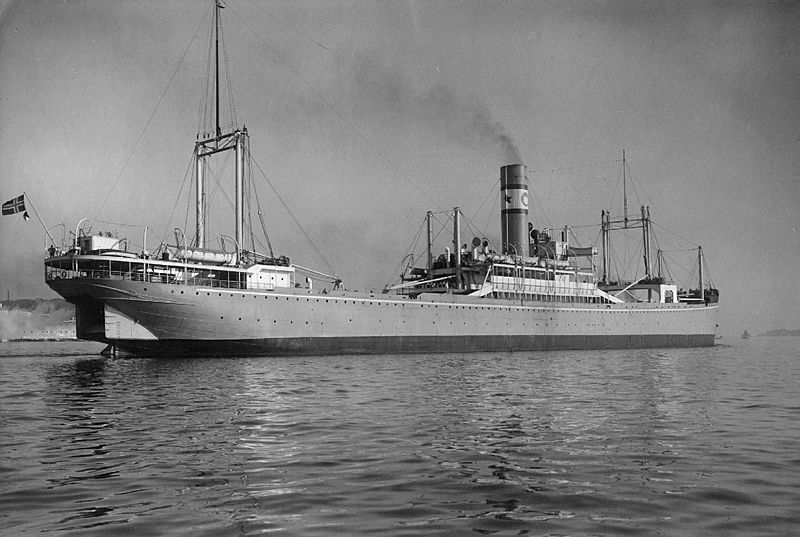
The whaling factory ship Solglimt. Note the new masts, and the stern chute for hauling whale carcasses aboard.

In November 1928 Hvalfangerstakjeselskabet 'Atlas' ("The Atlas Whaling Company") acquired Stockholm and had her refitted as a whaling factory ship. Her tonnages were revised to 12,279 GRT and 7,123 NRT. Atlas registered her in Larvik and appointed Christian Nielsen & Co to manage her. She entered service in her new role on 12 September 1929.

By 1930 her Norwegian code letters were LHNB, and she was equipped with wireless direction finding. In 1930 A/S Odd acquired Solglimt, registered her in Sandefjord, and appointed A/S Thor Dahl to manage her. By 1934 her call sign was LDMD.

On 14 January 1941 the German auxiliary cruiser Pinguin captured a Norwegian fleet of 11 whalers and three factory ships in the Southern Ocean. They included Solglimt, which was laden with whale oil. On 25 January Pinguin sent Solglimt to German-occupied France under a German prize crew. She reached Bordeaux on 16 March.

== Sonderburg ==
The Kriegsmarine kept the ship as a prize, renamed her Sonderburg, after Sønderborg in North Schleswig, and registered her in Hamburg.

In 1941 the Erste Deutsche Wahlfang Gesellschaft ("First German Whaling Company") managed Sonderburg. By 1942 the Trossschiffverband ("Supply Ship Association") was her manager. Also in 1942, she was in Cherbourg Harbour during a RAF Bomber Command. At least two bombs hit and damaged her.

In June 1944, German forces scuttled Sonderburg in the English Channel at Cherbourg. In August 1946 the French used explosives to demolish part of the ship to clear the port. In January 1947 the remains of her wreck were raised and towed to Britain, where the British Iron & Steel Corporation scrapped her.

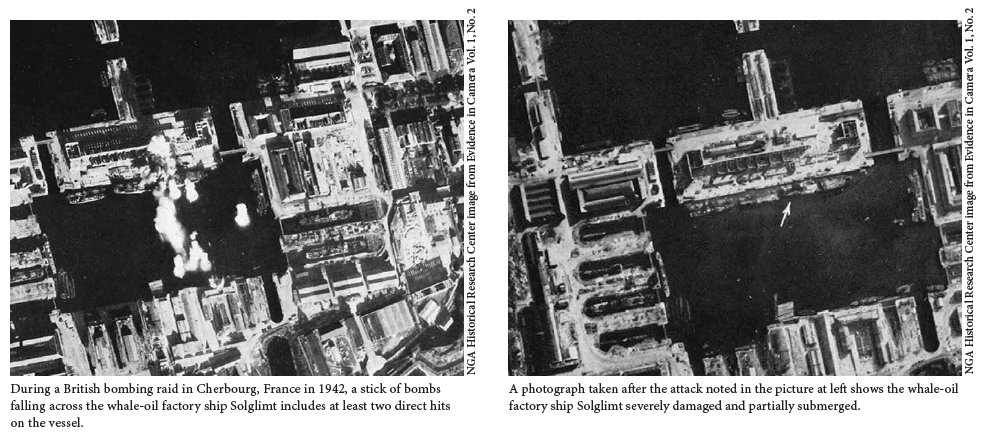
RAF photographs of Cherbourg Harbour during and after an air raid in 1942, showing Sonderburg during and after being bombed

== Bibliography ==
- Dowling, R (1909) [1903]. All About Ships & Shipping (3rd ed.). London: Alexander Moring Ltd.
- Lloyd's Register of British and Foreign Shipping. Vol. I.–Steamers. London: Lloyd's Register of Shipping. 1901 – via Internet Archive.
- Lloyd's Register of British and Foreign Shipping. Vol. I.–Steamers. London: Lloyd's Register of Shipping. 1910 – via Internet Archive.
- Lloyd's Register of Shipping. Vol. II.–Steamers. London: Lloyd's Register of Shipping. 1917 – via Internet Archive.
- Lloyd's Register of Shipping. Vol. II.–Steamers and Motorships. London: Lloyd's Register of Shipping. 1928 – via Internet Archive.
- Lloyd's Register of Shipping (PDF). Vol. II.–Steamers and Motorships of 300 Tons Gross and Over. London: Lloyd's Register of Shipping. 1930 – via Southampton City Council.
- Lloyd's Register of Shipping (PDF). Vol. II.–Steamers and Motorships of 300 Tons Gross and Over. London: Lloyd's Register of Shipping. 1934 – via Southampton City Council.
- The Marconi Press Agency Ltd (1913). The Year Book of Wireless Telegraphy and Telephony. London: The St Katherine Press.
- The Marconi Press Agency Ltd (1914). The Year Book of Wireless Telegraphy and Telephony. London: The Marconi Press Agency Ltd.
- The Marconi Press Agency Ltd (1918). The Year Book of Wireless Telegraphy and Telephony. London: The Wireless Press, Ltd.
