= Wales Head =

Wales Head (54°0′S 37°34′W) is a headland 2.5 nautical miles (4.6 km) east of Craigie Point on the north coast of South Georgia. Surveyed by the SGS in the period 1951–57, and named by the United Kingdom Antarctic Place-Names Committee (UK-APC) for William Wales (1734–1798), English astronomer sent by the Board of Longitude to make astronomical observations during Cook's second voyage, 1772–75, sailing in the Resolution.
