= List of mammals of South Georgia and the South Sandwich Islands =

This is a list of the mammal species recorded in South Georgia and the South Sandwich Islands. There are thirteen mammal species in South Georgia and the South Sandwich Islands, of which one is endangered.

The following tags are used to highlight each species' conservation status as assessed by the International Union for Conservation of Nature:

EX	Extinct	No reasonable doubt that the last individual has died.
EW	Extinct in the wild	Known only to survive in captivity or as a naturalized populations well outside its previous range.
CR	Critically endangered	The species is in imminent risk of extinction in the wild.
EN	Endangered	The species is facing an extremely high risk of extinction in the wild.
VU	Vulnerable	The species is facing a high risk of extinction in the wild.
NT	Near threatened	The species does not meet any of the criteria that would categorise it as risking extinction but it is likely to do so in the future.
LC	Least concern	There are no current identifiable risks to the species.
DD	Data deficient	There is inadequate information to make an assessment of the risks to this species.

== Order: Cetacea (whales) ==
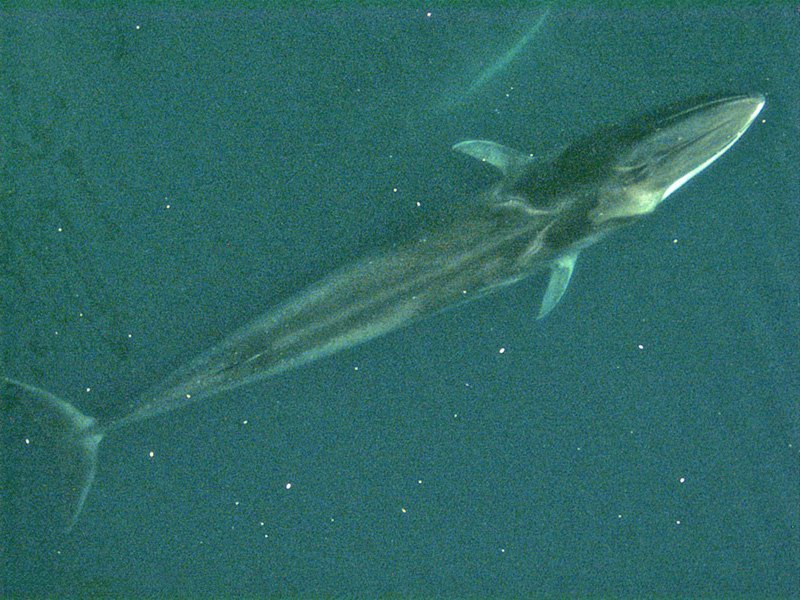
Fin whale

Orca

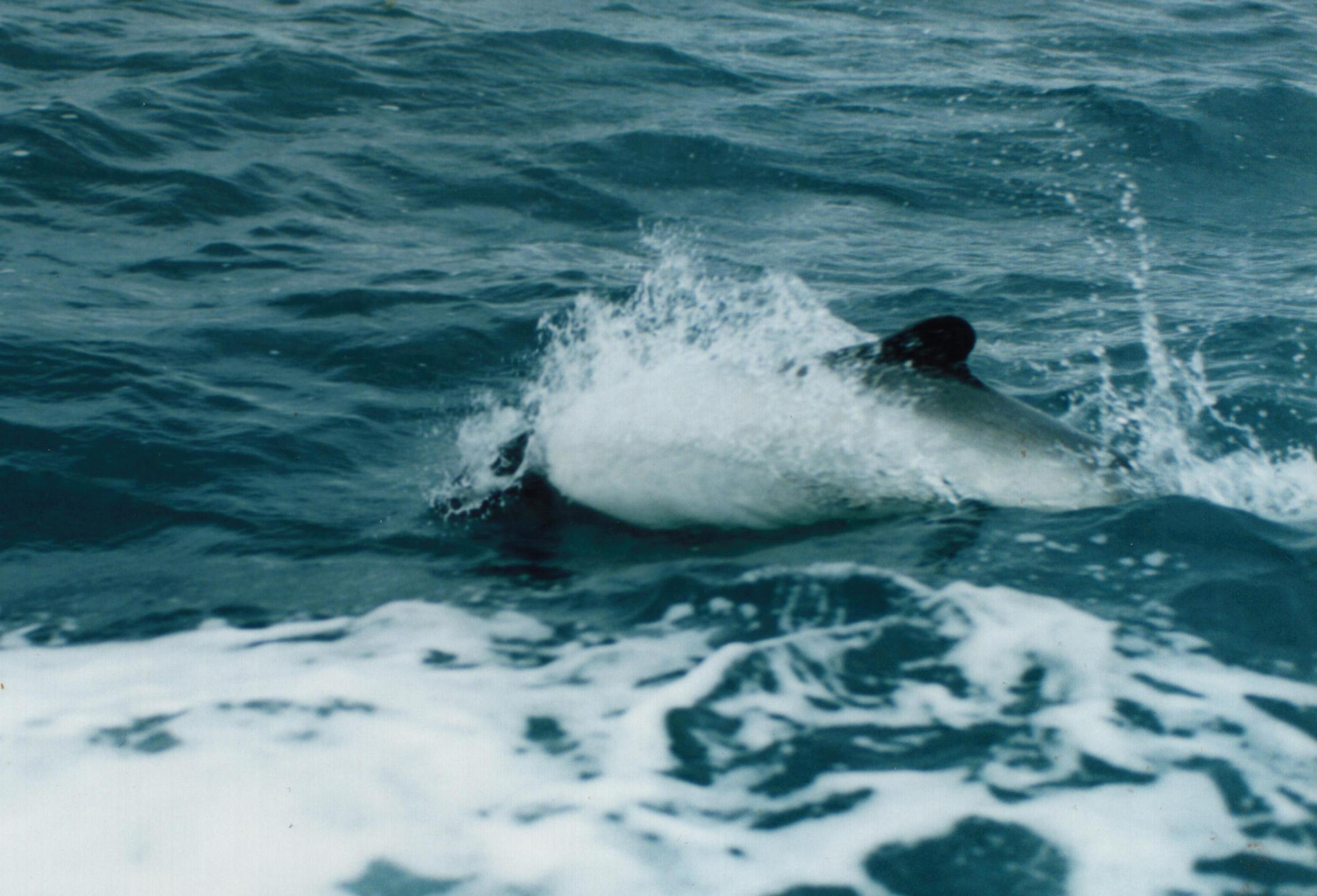
Commerson dolphin

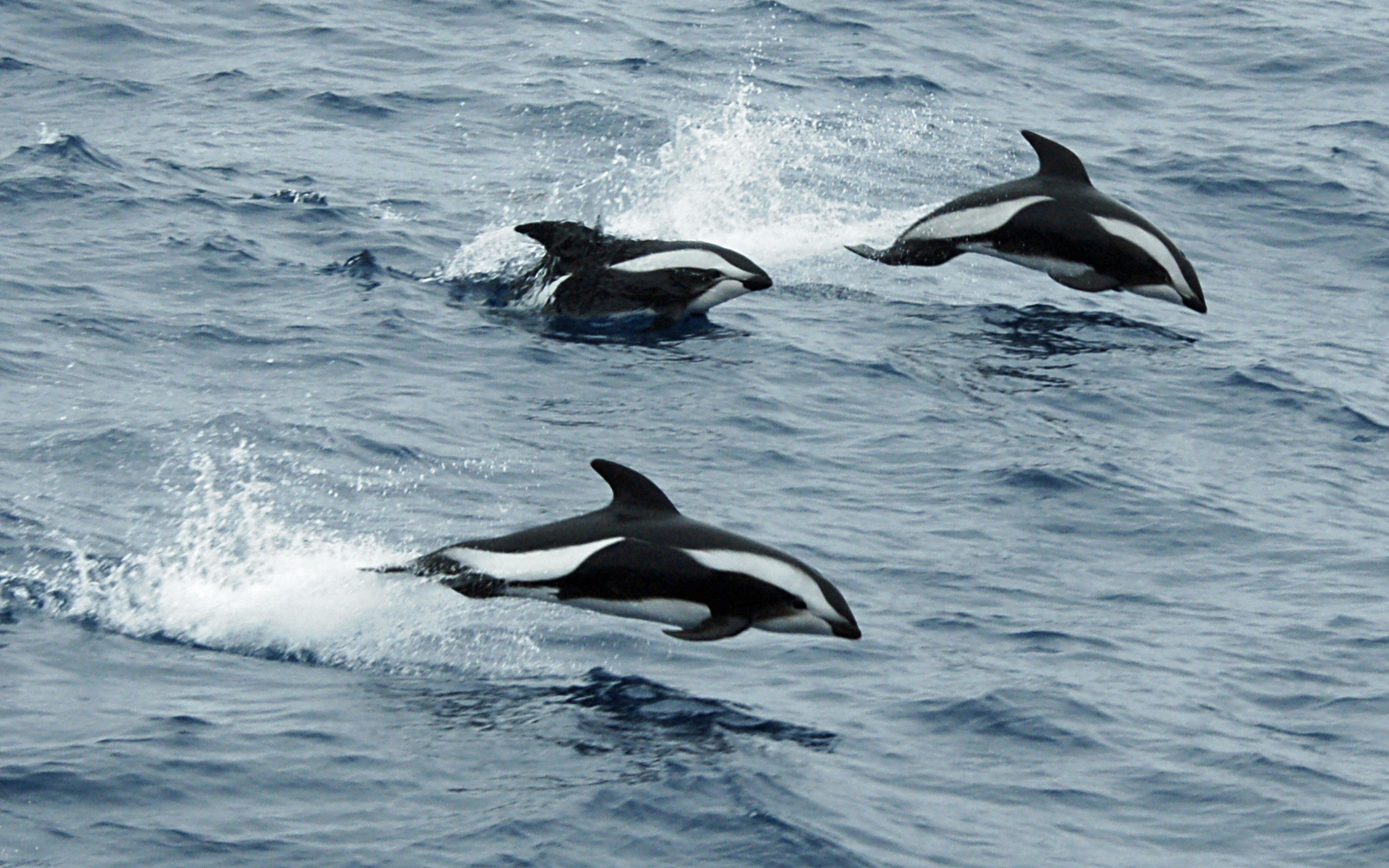
Hourglass dolphins

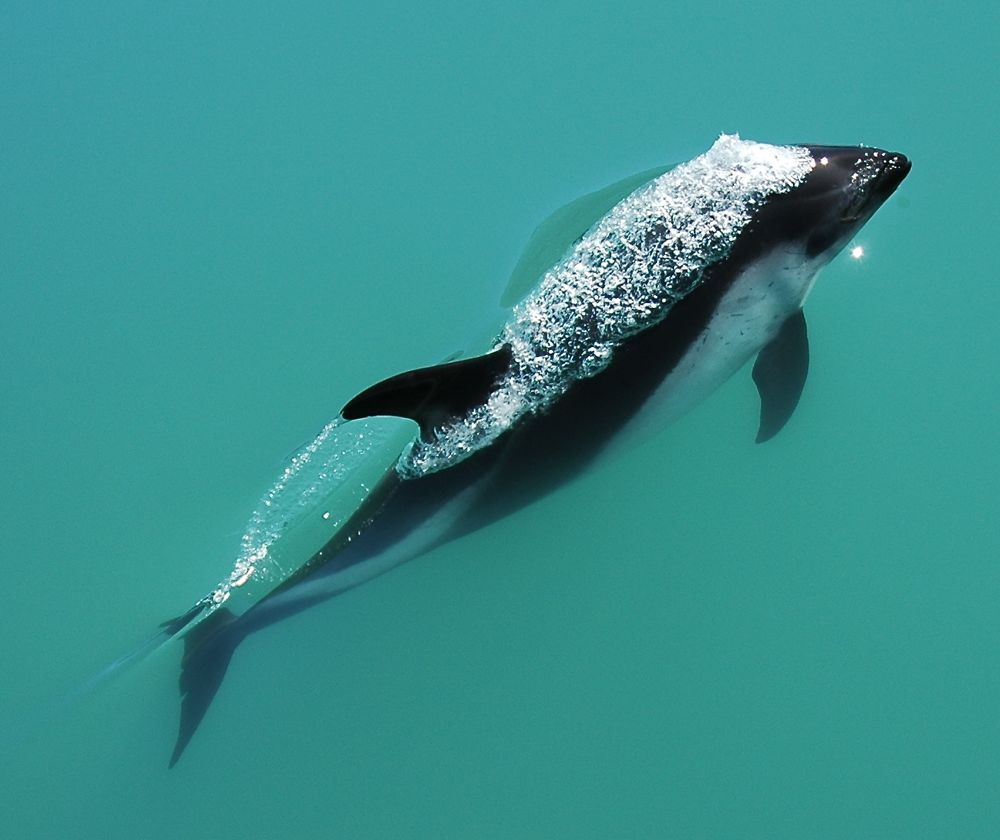
Peale's dolphin

The order Cetacea includes whales, dolphins and porpoises. They are the mammals most fully adapted to aquatic life with a spindle-shaped nearly hairless body, protected by a thick layer of blubber, and forelimbs and tail modified to provide propulsion underwater.

- Suborder: Mysticeti
  - Family: Balaenidae
    - Genus: Eubalaena
      - Southern right whale, Eubalaena australis LR/cd (Still rarer in these regions)
  - Family: Balaenopteridae
    - Subfamily: Balaenopterinae
      - Genus: Balaenoptera
        - Antarctic minke whale, Balaenoptera bonaerensis DD
        - Southern sei whale, Balaenoptera borealis schlegelii EN
        - Southern fin whale, Balaenoptera physalus quoyi EN
        - Southern blue whale, Balaenoptera musculus intermedia EN
    - Subfamily: Megapterinae
      - Genus: Megaptera
        - Humpback whale, Megaptera novaeangliae VU
- Suborder: Odontoceti
  - Superfamily: Platanistoidea
    - Family: Phocoenidae
      - Genus: Phocoena
        - Spectacled porpoise, Phocoena dioptrica DD
    - Family: Ziphidae
      - Genus: Berardius
        - Giant beaked whale, Berardius arnuxii LR/cd
      - Subfamily: Hyperoodontinae
        - Genus: Mesoplodon
          - Gray's beaked whale, Mesoplodon grayi DD
    - Family: Delphinidae (marine dolphins)
      - Genus: Cephalorhynchus
        - Commerson dolphin, Cephalorhynchus commersonii DD
      - Genus: Lagenorhynchus
        - Hourglass dolphin, Lagenorhynchus cruciger LR/lc
        - Peale's dolphin, Lagenorhynchus australis DD
      - Genus: Globicephala
        - Long-finned pilot whale, Globicephala melas DD
      - Genus: Orcinus
        - Orca, Orcinus orca LR/cd

== Order: Carnivora (carnivorans) ==
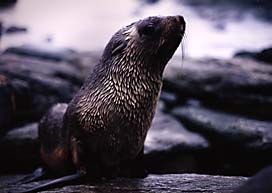
Antarctic fur seal

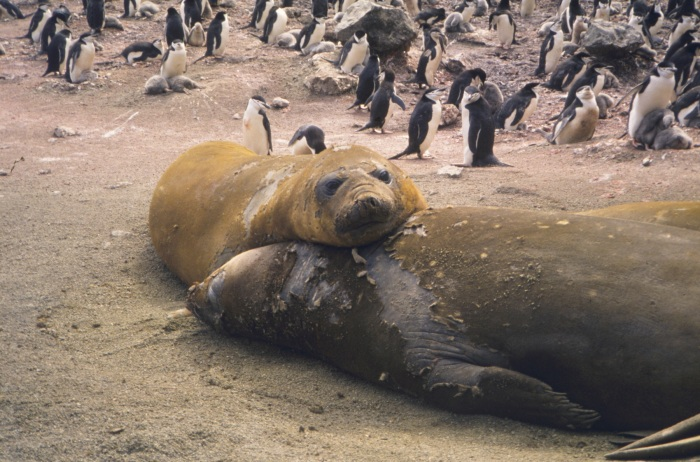
Southern elephant seal

There are over 260 species of carnivorans, the majority of which feed primarily on meat. They have a characteristic skull shape and dentition.

- Suborder: Caniformia
  - Family: Otariidae (eared seals, sealions)
    - Genus: Arctophoca
      - South American fur seal, Arctophoca australis LR/lc
      - Antarctic fur seal, Arctophoca gazella LR/lc
      - Subantarctic fur seal, Arctophoca tropicalis LR/lc
  - Family: Phocidae (earless seals)
    - Genus: Hydrurga
      - Leopard seal, H. leptonyx LR/lc
    - Genus: Leptonychotes
      - Weddell seal, Leptonychotes weddellii LR/lc
    - Genus: Lobodon
      - Crabeater seal, Lobodon carcinophaga LR/lc
    - Genus: Mirounga
      - Southern elephant seal, M. leonina LC

== Order: Artiodactyla (even-toed ungulates) ==
The even-toed ungulates are ungulates whose weight is borne about equally by the third and fourth toes, rather than mostly or entirely by the third as in perissodactyls. There are about 220 artiodactyl species, including many that are of great economic importance to humans.

- Family: Cervidae (deer)
  - Subfamily: Capreolinae
    - Genus: Rangifer
      - Reindeer, R. tarandus VU introduced, extirpated

== See also ==
- List of chordate orders
- Lists of mammals by region
- List of prehistoric mammals
- Mammal classification
- List of mammals described in the 2000s
