= Smillie Peak =

Mountain in South Georgia

Smillie Peak (54°17′S 36°57′W) is a rock peak, 1,765 m, standing 1 mile (1.6 km) east of Mount Corneliussen in the west extremity of the Allardyce Range of South Georgia. Surveyed by the SGS, 1951–52, and named by the United Kingdom Antarctic Place-Names Committee (UK-APC) for Gordon Smillie, SGS surveyor.
