= Newark Bay (South Georgia) =

Coordinates: 54°21′S 36°55′W

Newark Bay is a bay 3 miles (4.8 km) long, entered at the southeast end of Fanning Ridge, along the south coast of South Georgia. The presence of this bay seems to have been first noted in 1819 by a Russian expedition under Bellingshausen, who roughly charted a small inlet in this approximate position. The name dates back to about 1927 and has become established for the feature.
