= Esbensen Bay =

Bay in South Georgia

Esbensen Bay is a small bay 1 nautical mile (2 km) southwest of Nattriss Head, along the southeast end of South Georgia. It was charted by the Second German Antarctic Expedition, 1911–12, under Filchner, and was named for Captain Viktor Esbensen, manager of the Compañía Argentina de Pesca whaling station at Grytviken, the first land-based whaling station in Antarctica.

The southwest side of the entrance is marked by Shannon Point (54°52′S 35°58′W), charted in 1930 by Discovery Investigations personnel on the William Scoresby. It was named for Lieutenant Commander R.L.V. Shannon, Royal Navy, captain of the ship at the time of the survey.
