= Edmund Fanning (explorer) =

American explorer and sea captain (1769–1841)

- Born: July 16, 1769; Stonington, Connecticut, British America
- Died: April 23, 1841 (aged 71); New York City, U.S.
- Resting place: Robinson Burying Ground, Stonington, Connecticut
- Occupations: Sea captain, merchant
- Known for: Discovered Fanning, Washington, and Palmyra Islands
- Spouse: Sarah Sheffield
- Children: 3
- Relatives: Nathaniel Fanning (brother)

Edmund Fanning (July 16, 1769 – April 23, 1841) was an American explorer and sea captain, known as the "Pathfinder of the Pacific." Cape Fanning in Antarctica and Fanning Ridge on South Georgia Island are named after him.

== Early life ==
Edmund was the eighth of twelve children born to Gilbert and Huldah (Palmer) Fanning. They lived at Stonington in the British Crown Colony of Connecticut. His oldest brother, Nathaniel Fanning, became a naval officer who sailed with John Paul Jones against the British Navy during the American Revolutionary War. Their father, Gilbert, sided with the colonists during the war, providing supplies for the army of George Washington. Two of Fanning's paternal uncles sided with the British. One, also named Edmund Fanning, became a General and later lieutenant governor of Nova Scotia and Prince Edward Island.

Fanning went to sea as a cabin boy at the age of 14, and by the age of 24 was captain of a brig in which he visited the South Pacific for the first time.

== Career at sea ==
A successful trader, Fanning made a fortune in the China trade, killing seals in the South Pacific and exchanging their skins in China for silks, spices, and tea; which he in turn sold in New York City. As master of the Betsey in 1797–1798, he discovered three South Pacific Islands — Fanning, Washington, and Palmyra — which are collectively known as the Fanning Islands. (Fanning Island, today known as Tabuaeran, is part of Kiribati, while Palmyra, claimed by the Hawaiian Government in 1862 and owned for many years by a Hawaiian family, was purchased in 2000 by the Nature Conservancy for an ongoing study of global warming and its effect on coral reefs.)

When he discovered Palmyra Atoll, Fanning was sleeping and the ship was in command of the first mate. Fanning awoke three times in the night, and he took this as a premonition, ordering the first mate to heave to. In the morning, the ship resumed its travel and reached the reef of Palmyra in less than a mile. Had the ship continued its course at night, the entire crew might have perished.

Acting for American investors, Fanning was agent for more than 70 commercial expeditions and voyages. His partnership Fanning & Coles built the ship Tonquin in 1807, sailed her around the world several times and sold her for $37,000 to John Jacob Astor's Pacific Fur Company. Later the Tonquin was burned by Native Americans in the northwest. In 1829 he was instrumental in sending out the first American naval exploring expedition and was greatly responsible for Congress's authorizing of the Wilkes Expedition.

== Personal life ==
Fanning married Sarah Sheffield in 1792 and two years later they moved to New York City. Their first child, Edmund, died in infancy. Their son William married Juliet Palmer whose brother Nathaniel Palmer was a notable sea explorer and ship captain. William was captain of the ship Bunker Hill when he died in 1826 in the West Indies from black fever. His wife Juliet and daughter Sarah went to live with the Fannings in New York City. The Fannings' third child, also named Sarah, married John James Bleecker and they had nine children. Sarah Sheffield Fanning and Edmund Fanning died in 1841 within four days of each other after fifty-one years of marriage.

Edmund Fanning was socially well-connected in New York, and maintained close friendships with individuals such as William Irving, his neighbor and primary connection to the Madison and Monroe administrations.

== Publications ==
Fanning's memoirs, Voyages Around the World, were published in 1833. Another book, Voyages to the South Seas, followed in 1838.

== Honors ==
Cape Fanning in Antarctica and Fanning Ridge on South Georgia Island are named after Edmund Fanning.
