= Mount Corneliussen =

Mountain in South Georgia

Mount Corneliussen (54°17′S 36°58′W) is a mountain, 1,540 metres (5,050 ft) high, standing 1 nautical mile (2 km) north of Mount Globus at the west end of the Allardyce Range of South Georgia. It was surveyed by the South Georgia Survey in the period 1951–57, and named by the UK Antarctic Place-Names Committee for Norwegian engineers Carl and Erling Corneliussen, who between 1923 and 1938 were responsible for improvements in whaling equipment, especially devices in connection with explosive harpoons.
