= Viktor Esbensen =

Norwegian explorer

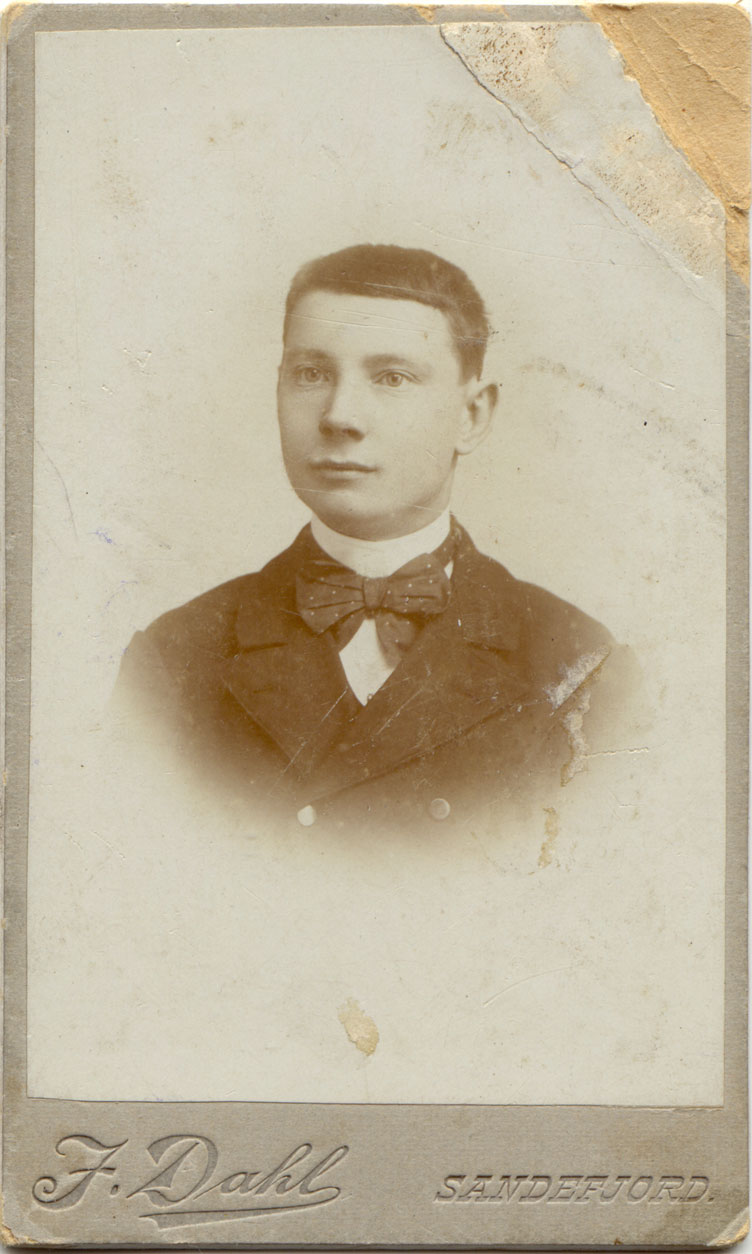
- Viktor Esbensen
- Born: 11 March 1881; Vardø, Norway
- Died: 29 January 1942 (aged 60); At sea, near Falmouth, England
- Occupation: Whaler
- Spouse: Elvina Adeline Birgitte Larsen
- Relatives: Carl Anton Larsen (father-in-law)

Viktor Esbensen (11 March 1881 – 29 January 1942) was a Norwegian mariner known for exploring the Antarctic region together with his father-in-law Carl Anton Larsen, looking to make a living from whaling. He was killed when his ship was sunk in World War II.

== Early life ==
Esbensen was born at Vardø in Finnmark, Norway to Peder Esbensen (1842–1897) and his wife Karen Cappelen Berge (1849–1892). Both his parents had died by 1897 after which he was adopted by the Larsen family and went to live in Sandefjord. In 1907 in Ullern he married Elvina Adeline Birgithe Larsen (1884–1956) who was the daughter of ship-owner and whaler Carl Anton Larsen. The couple settled in Bærum Municipality, and had six children.

== Career ==
Esbensen was educated as a first mate and shipmaster after leaving middle school. He was among the original founding party of Grytviken, South Georgia along with Carl Anton Larsen. Esbensen was a manager for Compañía Argentina de Pesca, which organized the building of Grytviken, the first land-based whaling station in Antarctica put into operation on 24 December 1904. Esbensen Bay is named after him.

Around the outbreak of World War II, Esbensen took over as Captain of the ship SS Bjørnvik. The ship escaped the German invasion of Norway on 9 April 1940, having arrived in Methil on 3 April, and continued in service in and around the United Kingdom. On the morning of 27 January 1942, the ship was en route from Newport to Fowey with a cargo of patent fuel, and had joined a convoy. However, due to bad weather the ship lost its convoy in the evening the same day, and in the afternoon the next day it was suddenly attacked and sunk by German aircraft outside of Falmouth, England. The ship being hit by five bombs, she sank in half a minute. Most of its crew perished, including Esbensen. His date of death was given as 29 January. Only the first mate, a stoker and a gunner survived.

== See also ==
- History of South Georgia and the South Sandwich Islands
