= Factory ship =

Large oceangoing fish processing vessel

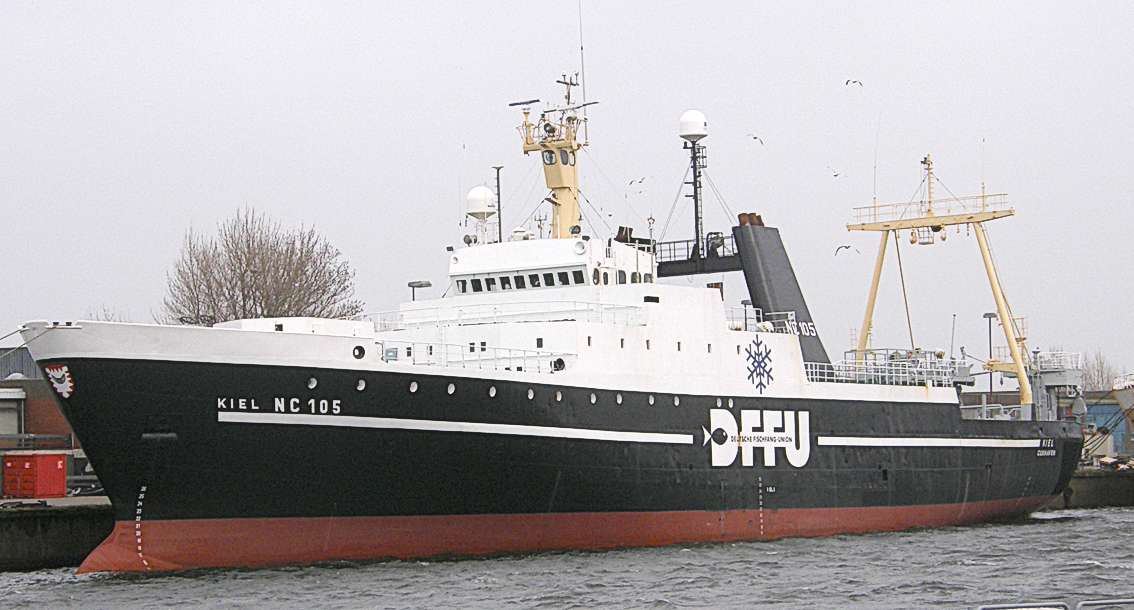
The German factory ship Kiel NC 105

A factory ship, also known as a fish processing vessel, is a large ocean-going vessel with extensive on-board facilities for processing and freezing caught fish or whales. Modern factory ships are automated and enlarged versions of the earlier whalers, and their use for fishing has grown dramatically. Some factory ships are equipped to serve as a mother ship.

== Background ==
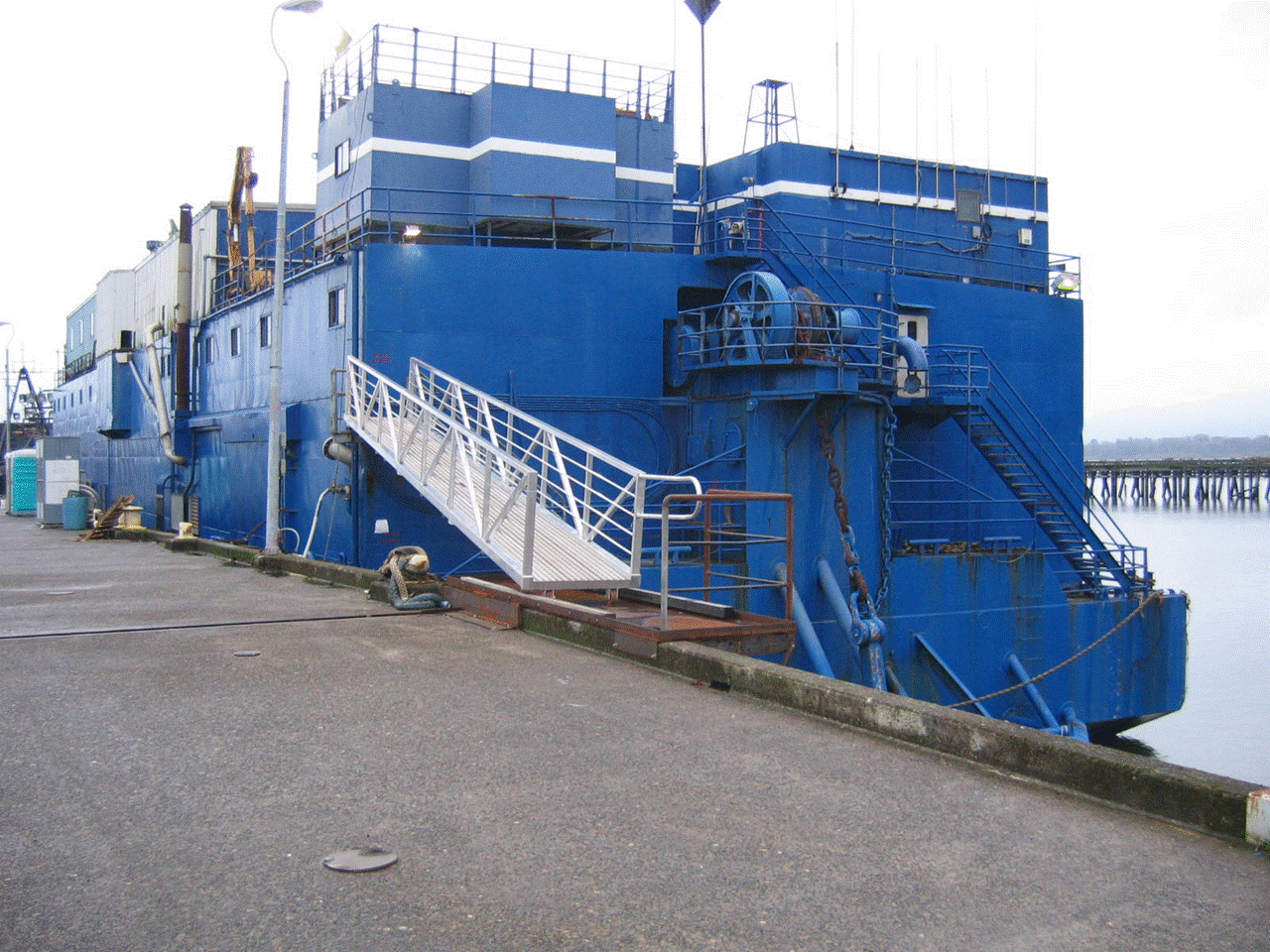
Floating fish processor Atlantis docked in Astoria, Oregon

Contemporary factory ships have their origins in the early whalers. These vessels sailed into remote waters and processed the whale oil on board, discarding the carcass. Later whalers converted the entire whale into usable products. The efficiency of these ships and the predation they carried out on whales contributed greatly to the animals' steep decline.

Contemporary factory ships are automated and enlarged versions of these earlier whalers. Their use for fishing has grown dramatically. For a while, Russia, Japan and Korea operated huge fishing fleets centred on factory ships, though in recent times this use has been declining. On the other hand, the use of factory ships by the United States has increased.

Some factory ships can also function as mother ships. The basic idea of a mother ship is that it can carry small fishing boats that return to the mother ship with their catch. But the idea extends to include factory trawlers supporting a fleet of smaller catching vessels that are not carried on board. They serve as the main ship in a fleet operating in waters a great distance from their home ports.

== Types ==
Factory ships consist of various types, including freezer trawlers, longline factory vessels, purse seine freezer vessels, stern trawlers and squid jiggers.

=== Factory stern trawler ===
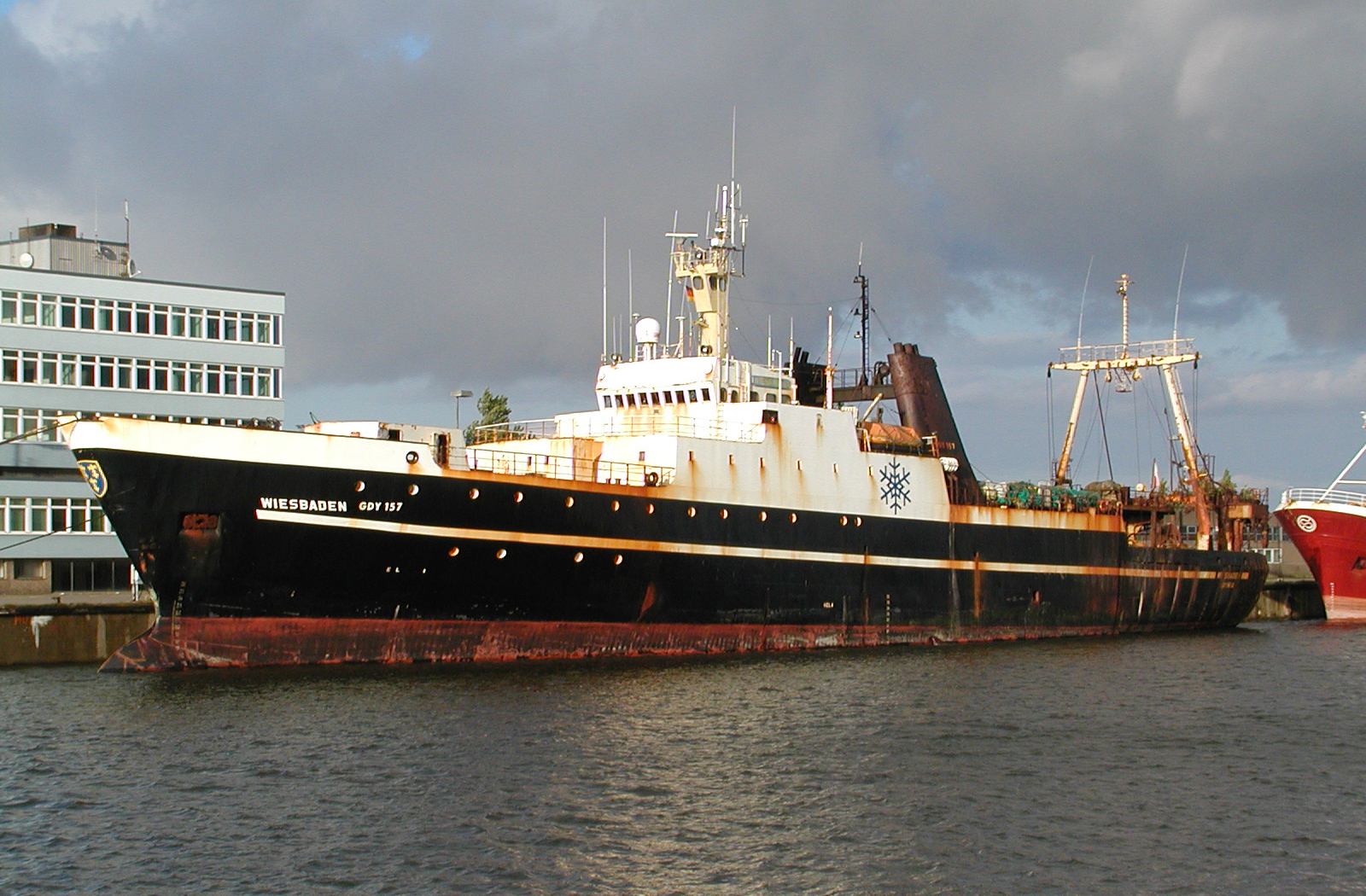
The factory trawler Wiesbaden

A factory stern trawler is a large stern trawler which has additional onboard processing facilities and can stay at sea for days or weeks at a time. A stern trawler tows a fishing trawl net and hauls the catch up a stern ramp. These can be either demersal (weighted bottom trawling); pelagic (mid-water trawling); or pair trawling, where two vessels about 500 metres apart together pull one huge net with a mouth circumference of 900 meters.

=== Freezer trawler ===
A freezer trawler fully processes the catch on board to customers’ specifications, into frozen-at-sea fillet, block or head and gutted form. Factory freezer trawlers can run from 60 to 70 meters in length and might stay at sea six weeks at a time with a crew over 35 people. They process fish into fillets within hours of being caught. Onboard fishmeal plants process the waste product so everything is utilized.

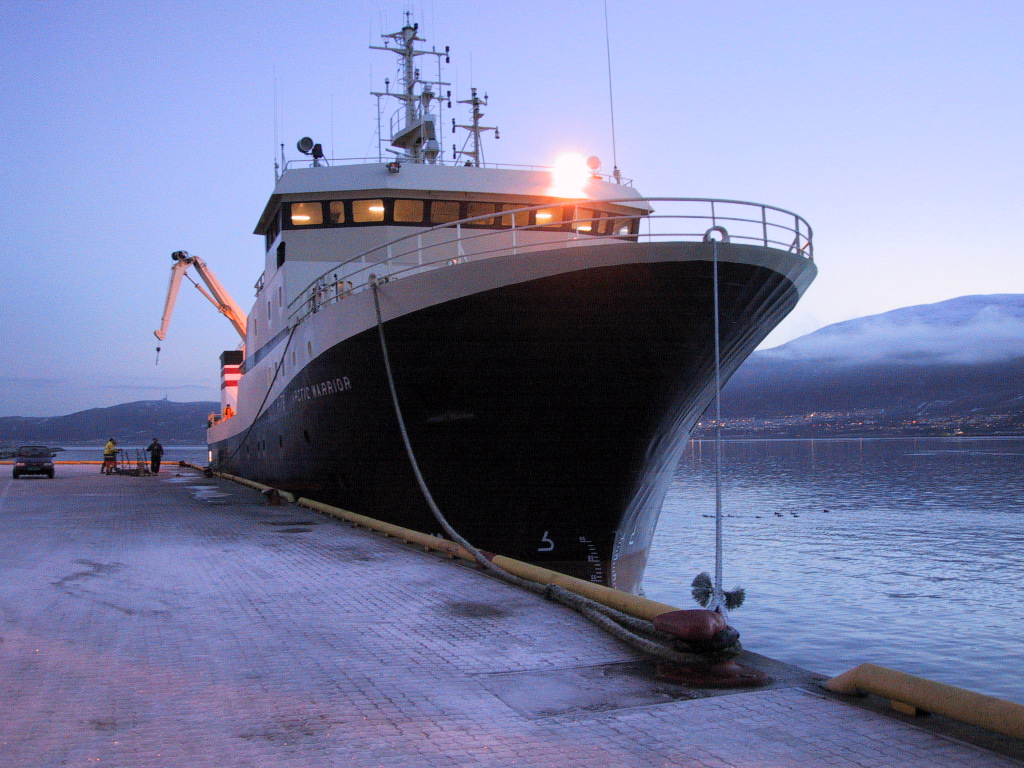
Arctic Warrior freezer trawler working out of Hull, England

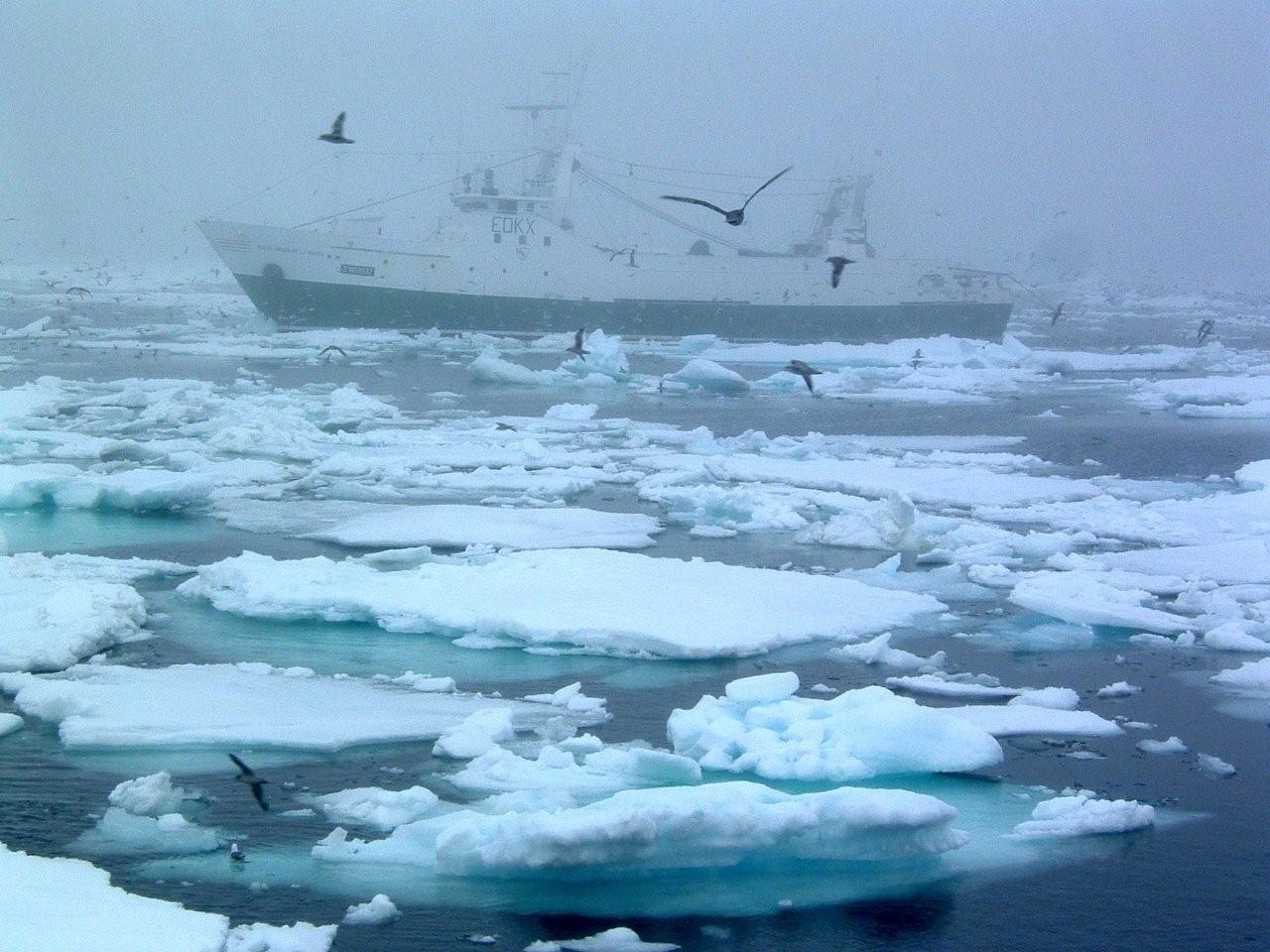
The Spanish Trawler Nuevo Virgen De La Barca in North Atlantic waters

The world's largest freezing trawler by gross tonnage is the 144-metre-long Annelies Ilena ex Atlantic Dawn. In 2015, the Annelies Ilena was detained by the Irish Navy and the Sea Fisheries Protection Agency for breach of regulations. The owners were subsequently fined 105,000 Euros for illegally fishing in Irish waters. She is able to process 350 tonnes of fish a day, can carry 3,000 tons of fuel, and store 7,000 tons of graded and frozen catch. She uses on board forklift trucks to aid discharging.

=== Factory bottom longliner ===
These automated bottom longliners fish using hooks strung on long lines. The hooks are baited automatically and the lines are released very fast. Many thousands of hooks are set each day, the retrieval and setting of these hooks is a continuous 24-hour-a-day operation. These ships go to sea for six weeks at a time. They contain factories for processing fish into fillets, which are frozen in packs, ready for market, within hours of being caught. These vessels sometimes also have fishmeal plants on board.

=== Purse seiner ===
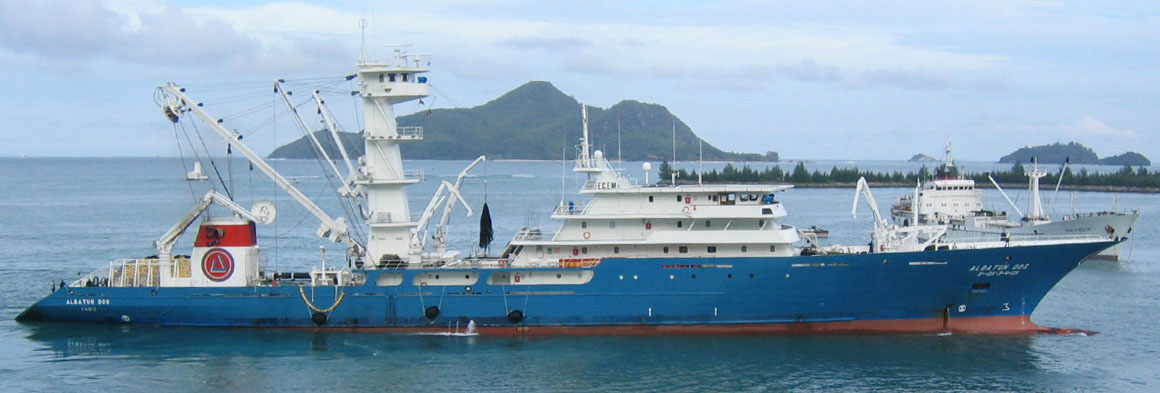
The factory tuna purser Albatun Dos operating around the Seychelles Islands

A purse seiner is a fishing vessel which uses a traditional method of catching tuna and other school fish species. A large net is set in a circle around a school of fish while on the surface. The net is then pursed, closing the bottom of the net, then pulling up the net until the fish are caught alongside the vessel. Most of these types of vessels then transfer the fish into a tank filled with brine (extra salty refrigerated water). This freezes large amounts of fish quickly. Trip lengths can vary from 20 to 70 days depending on the fishing. The fish is held in refrigerated brine tanks and unloads either directly to the canneries or is trans-shipped to carrier vessels to freight to the canneries, leaving the purse seine vessel close to the fishing grounds to continue fishing. Purse seiners longer than 70 metres are called super seiners.

External image
- Squid jig

=== Factory squid jigger ===
A factory squid jigger is a specialized ship that uses powerful lights to attract squid and then "jigs" many thousands of hooked lures from hundreds of separate winches. These predominantly Japanese and Korean factory vessels and their crews may fish the oceans continuously for two years, periodically transferring their catch at the fishing grounds to larger refrigerated vessels.

=== Factory barges ===
Some fish processing factories are installed on barges, making a floating factory which can be towed across navigable waters to receive catches from commercial fishing vessels. The barges often contain living quarters for the factory workers.

=== Whaler factory ===
The 8,145-ton MV Nisshin Maru was the mothership of the Japanese whaling fleet and was the world's only remaining whaler factory ship until its decommissioning in 2023. The ship is owned by Tokyo-based company Kyodo Senpaku Kaisha Ltd. and is contracted by the Japanese Institute of Cetacean Research.

== Overfishing ==
Commercial fishing practices can affect non-target species, including seabirds, whales, dolphins, turtles, and sharks, particularly when large-scale or non-selective harvesting methods are used.

Purse seine vessels, for example, may deploy nets extending up to several kilometres in circumference to encircle entire shoals of pelagic fish such as mackerel, herring, and tuna.

A widely cited international study published in 2006 reported that approximately one-third of assessed global fish stocks had declined to less than 10% of their historical maximum abundance. The authors noted that, under certain scenarios, continued overexploitation could lead to widespread stock collapses in the absence of effective management. Subsequent research has emphasized that improved fisheries governance can stabilize or rebuild depleted stocks.

According to the Food and Agriculture Organization’s State of World Fisheries and Aquaculture 2004, an estimated 25% of assessed fish stocks in 2003 were overexploited, depleted, or in recovery, indicating the need for rebuilding efforts.

Overfishing also affects ecosystems beyond target species. As fishing activity has expanded into deeper waters, vulnerable deep-sea ecosystems and long-lived species have been exposed to increased pressure. Studies published in the early 2000s estimated that populations of large predatory fish had declined substantially compared to pre-industrial levels.

Global demand for fish products has increased markedly since the mid-20th century. From 1950 to 1969, global fish production grew rapidly, with further acceleration in subsequent decades. Without effective management or alternative sources such as expanded aquaculture, rising demand can intensify pressure on wild fish stocks.

In some regions, overfishing has reduced fish populations to levels at which commercial fishing is no longer economically viable without government subsidies. Analyses have suggested that global fishing capacity substantially exceeds what marine ecosystems can sustainably support.

== See also ==
- Fish factory
- Research vessel
