= St Paul's Church, Jarrow =

Coordinates: 54.9804°N 1.4722°W

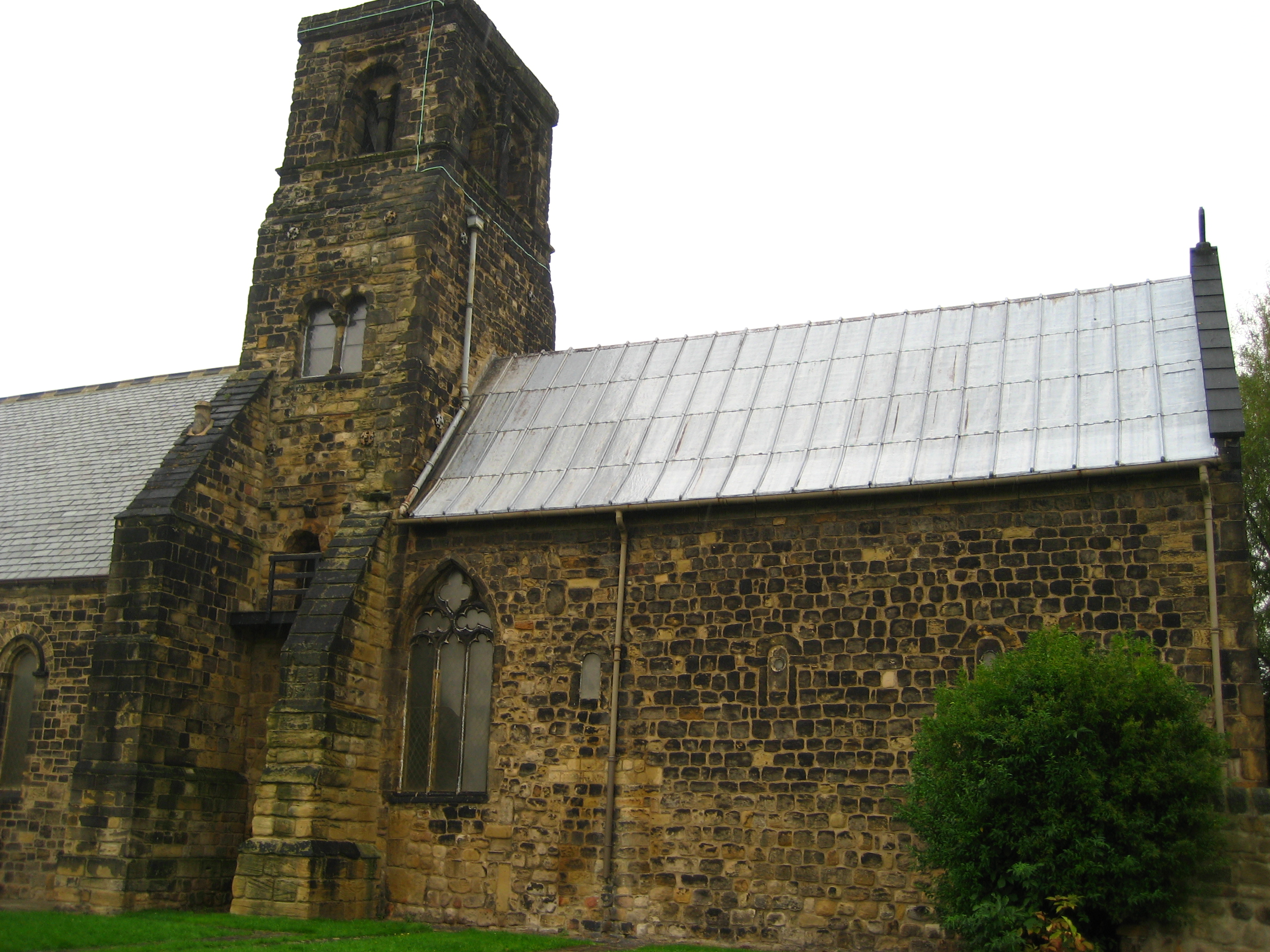
- St Paul's Church chancel, showing small Anglo-Saxon windows at right

- Location within Tyne and Wear
- OS grid reference: NZ 33879 65216
- Location: Jarrow, Tyne and Wear
- Country: England
- Denomination: Church of England
- Website: St Paul's

History
- Status: parish church
- Founder(s): King Ecgfrith; Abbot Ceolfrith
- Dedication: Saint Paul

Architecture
- Functional status: Active
- Heritage designation: Grade I listed
- Designated: 8 May 1950
- Style: Anglo-Saxon, Decorated Gothic, Gothic Revival
- Years built: 7th, 10th, 14th & 19th centuries

Specifications
- Materials: rubble masonry

Administration
- Province: York
- Diocese: Diocese of Durham
- Archdeaconry: Sunderland

St Paul's Church, Jarrow, is a Church of England parish church in the Parish of Jarrow and Simonside, on the south bank of the River Tyne in northern England. It was founded in 681 as a part of the Monkwearmouth–Jarrow Abbey. Most of the church is later, but the chancel is the remains of a free-standing chapel of the original monastery. Above the chancel arch is a dedication stone dating to 23 April 685, making this one of, if not the, oldest church dedication stones in England. The Church was dedicated to St Paul by King Ecgfrith and Abbot Ceolfrith. The priest and scholar Bede spent most of his life at the monastery and almost certainly worshipped in the oldest part of the church.

== Architecture ==
=== Anglo-Saxon ===
The original church on the site was built in 681 at the behest of King Ecgfrith, who donated land for its constitution as a part of the Monkwearmouth–Jarrow Abbey. The chancel is the remains of a free-standing chapel of the original monastery. Within the church, in the centre of the North Nave, the foot of a fine Anglo-Saxon cross is on display, its surviving Latin inscription reads: In this unique sign, life is restored to the word. On an inner wall of the tower is a dedication stone dating to 23 April 685, making this one of, if not the oldest, church dedication stones in England. The Church was dedicated to St Paul in the 15th year of King Ecgfrith and the 4th year of the Abbot Ceolfrith. The remains and markers for some of the later (medieval) abbey can be found in the church ground. In 794, the Vikings sacked the church and monastery, but in 1074 it was repaired and the monastery refounded by Aidwin, Prior of Winchcombe Abbey in Gloucestershire. The monastery became a daughter house of the Benedictine community in Durham. At the Dissolution of the Monasteries, St Paul's became a parish church.

=== Gothic and Gothic Revival ===
The rest of the church is much later. The late 15th-century choir stalls on the north side of the chancel are noteworthy. The nave and the north aisle were built by Sir George Gilbert Scott. There is, in addition to the older windows, including a few pieces of Anglo-Saxon stained glass, a more modern window by John Piper (1903–92).The church also has on display 'Bede’s Chair' (but evidence suggests that this originated after Bede's death).

=== Modern ===
Fenwick Lawson created several carved wood sculptures for St Paul's Church, including "St Michael and the Devil" (1956), showing the archangel Michael defeating Satan; "The Risen Ascended Christ" (1968), depicting Christ's ascension; and "The Venerable Bede" (1973), a life-size carving of the 8th-century scholar and monk.

The three-light window in the east wall of the chancel, which replaced glass lost during the Second World War, was installed in 1951. Designed and manufactured by the Newcastle-based stained glass artist Leonard Evetts, it shows Christ flanked by two saints. Evetts also made glass for St Peter's Church in Monkwearmouth, the companion church of the twin-monastery of Monkwearmouth-Jarrow Abbey.

Positioned in the north wall of the Anglo-Saxon chancel is a lancet window installed in 1985 to commemorate the 1,300th anniversary of the founding of Monkwearmouth–Jarrow Abbey by St Benedict Biscop. Designed by John Piper and manufactured by Patrick Reyntiens it depicts a double-armed Jarrow Cross in white, edged in green and detailed in silver stain. The cross is set on a blue background with red and yellow flame detail. The initials BB (for Benedict Biscop) are below.

== Jarrow Lecture ==
Since 1958, an annual lecture has been delivered at the church by a prominent scholar on a topic in the history of Jarrow:

- 1958 Bertram Colgrave, "The Venerable Bede and his times".
- 1959 Peter Hunter Blair, "Bede's Ecclesiastical History of the English Nation and its importance today".
- 1960 Dorothy Whitelock, "After Bede".
- 1961 Harold McCarter Taylor, "English Architecture in the time of Bede".
- 1962 J. M. Wallace-Hadrill, "Bede's Europe".
- 1963 George Addleshaw, "The Pastoral Organisation of the modern Dioceses of Durham and Newcastle in the time of Bede".
- 1964 Paul Meyvaert, "Bede and Gregory the Great".
- 1965 Rosemary Cramp, "Early Northumbrian Sculpture".
- 1966 Gerald Bonner, "Saint Bede in the tradition of Western apocalyptic commentary".
- 1967 Rupert Bruce-Mitford, "The Art of the Codes Amiatinus".
- 1968 J. D. A. Ogilvy, "The place of Wearmouth and Jarrow in Western cultural history".
- 1969 David M. Wilson, "Reflections on the St Ninian's Isle Treasure".
- 1970 Kathleen Hughes, "Early Christianity in Pictland".
- 1971 T. J. Brown, "Northumbria and the Book of Kells".
- 1972 Dom Anselm Hughes, "The Music of Aldwyn's house at Jarrow and the early twelfth century music of Durham Priory".
- 1973 Charles Thomas, "Bede, Archaeology and the Cult of Relics".
- 1974 Rosalind Hill, "The Labourers in the Field".
- 1975 Robert Austin Markus, "Bede and the tradition of ecclesiastical historiography".
- 1976 Henry Mayr-Harting "The Venerable Bede, the Rule of St Benedict, and Social Class".
- 1977 Per Jonas Nordhagen, "The Codex Amiatinus and the Byzantine element in the Northumbrian Renaissance".
- 1978 Richard N. Bailey, "The Durham Cassiodorus".
- 1979 James Campbell, "Bede's Reges and Principes".
- 1980 George Henderson, "Bede and the Visual Arts".
- 1981 Eric Fletcher, "Benedict Biscop".
- 1982 Malcolm Parkes, "The Scriptorium of Wearmouth-Jarrow".
- 1983 Peter Clemoes, "The Cult of St Oswald on the Continent".
- 1984 Patrick Wormald, "Bede and the Conversion of England: The Charter Evidence".
- 1985 Wesley M. Stevens, "Bede's Scientific Achievement".
- 1986 A. J. Piper, "The Durham Monks at Jarrow".
- 1987 David Parsons, "Books and Buildings: Architectural Description before and after Bede".
- 1988 Leslie Alcock, "Bede, Eddius and the Forts of the North Britons".
- 1989 Christopher D. Morris, "Church and Monastery in the Far North: An Archaeological Evaluation".
- 1990 James T. Lang, "The Anglian Sculpture of Deira: The Classical Tradition".
- 1991 Benedicta Ward, "Bede and the Psalter".
- 1992 David Peter Kirby, "Bede's Historia Ecclesiastica Gentis Anglorum: Its contemporary setting".
- 1993 Michael Lapidge, "Bede the Poet".
- 1994 Éamonn Ó Carragáin, "The City of Rome and the World of Bede".
- 1995 Ian Wood, "The Most Holy Abbot Ceolfrid".
- 1996 George Hardin Brown, "Bede the Educator".
- 1997 Roger Ray, "Bede, Rhetoric, and the creation of Christian Latin Culture".
- 1998 Joyce Hill, "Bede and the Benedictine Reform".
- 1999 Nicholas Brooks, "Bede and the English".
- 2000 Michelle P. Brown, "'In the Beginning was the Word': Books and Faith in the Age of Bede".
- 2001 David Rollason, "Bede and Germany".
- 2002 Martin Biddle, "Bede and Holy Places".
- 2003 Clare Stancliffe, "Bede, Wilfrid, and the Irish".
- 2004 Richard Morris, "Journeys from Jarrow".
- 2005 Alan Thacker, "Bede and Augustine of Hippo: History and Figure in Sacred Text".
- 2006 P. D. A. Harvey, "Maps in the Age of Bede".
- 2007 John Bradley, "The Irish Monastery in the age of Bede".
- 2008 Martin Carver, "The Pictish Monastery at Portmahomack".
- 2009 Barbara Yorke, "Rex Doctissimus. Bede and King Aldfrith of Northumbria".
- 2010 John Blair, "Bede and the Culture of the Laity".
- 2011 N. J. Higham, "Bede as an Oral Historian".
- 2012 Sarah Foot, "Bede's Church".
- 2013 Lesley Abrams, "Bede, Gregory, and Strategies of Conversion in Anglo-Saxon England and the Spanish New World".
- 2014 Jennifer O'Reilly, "St Paul and the sign of Jonah".
- 2015 Richard Gem, "Bede and Architectural History".
- 2016 Faith Wallis, "Bede and Wisdom".
- 2017 Richard Gemeson, "Codex Amiatinus: Making and Meaning".
- 2018 Thomas O'Loughlin, "Where is the Temple Now".
- 2019 Thomas O'Loughlin, 'Bede and the Taberncale: Where is the Tabernacle now?".
- 2021 Duco Vollebregt, "The Breadth of Sound Tradition".
- 2023 Mairin MacCarron, "How did Bede know how old he was?".
- 2024 John Blair, "Bede and Vernacular Culture".
- 2025 Leslie Webster, "What has Bede to do with the Franks Casket?".
- 2026 Thomas Pickles, "Bede, Providence, and Early Medieval Kingship".

== Gallery ==
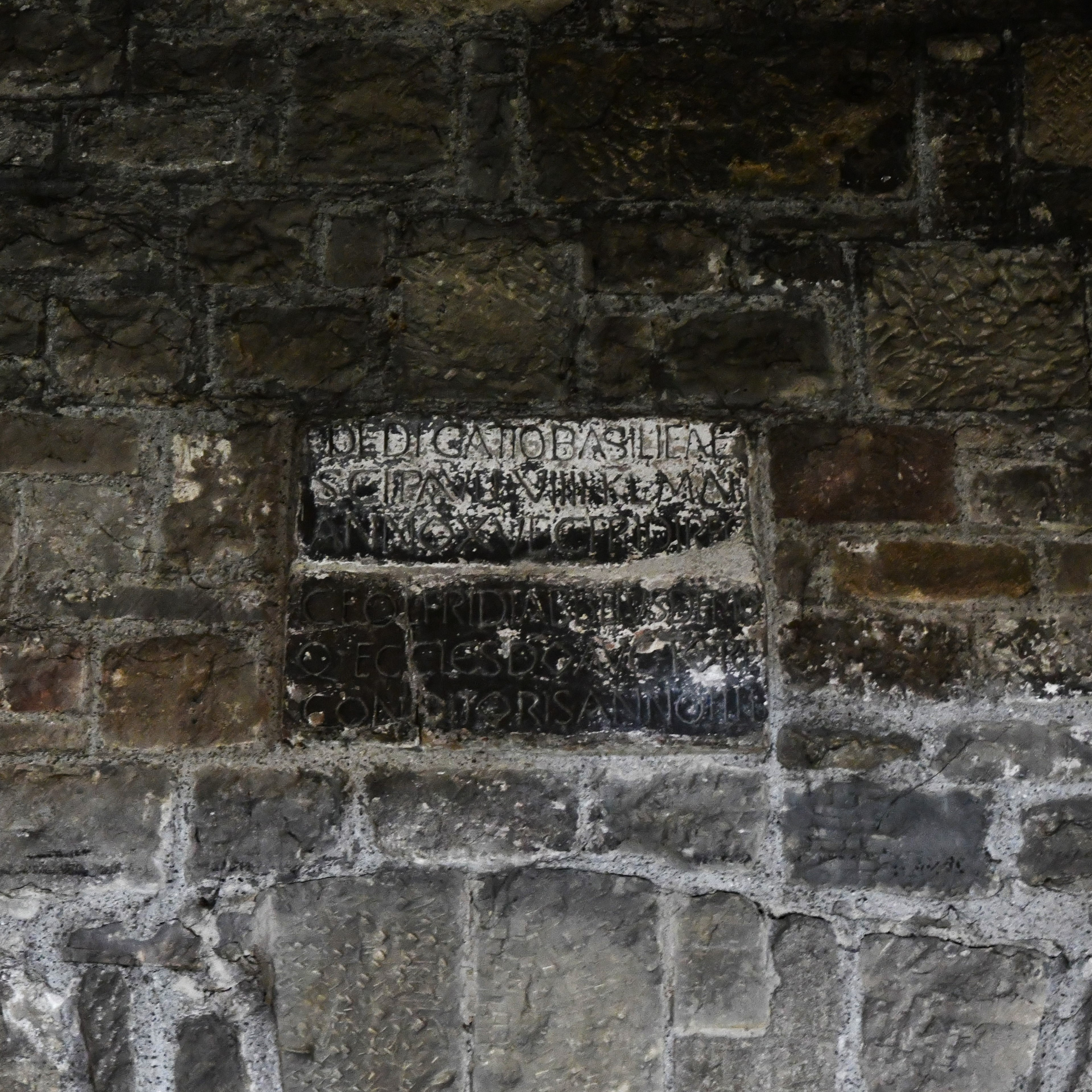
685 Dedication stone situated above western tower arch

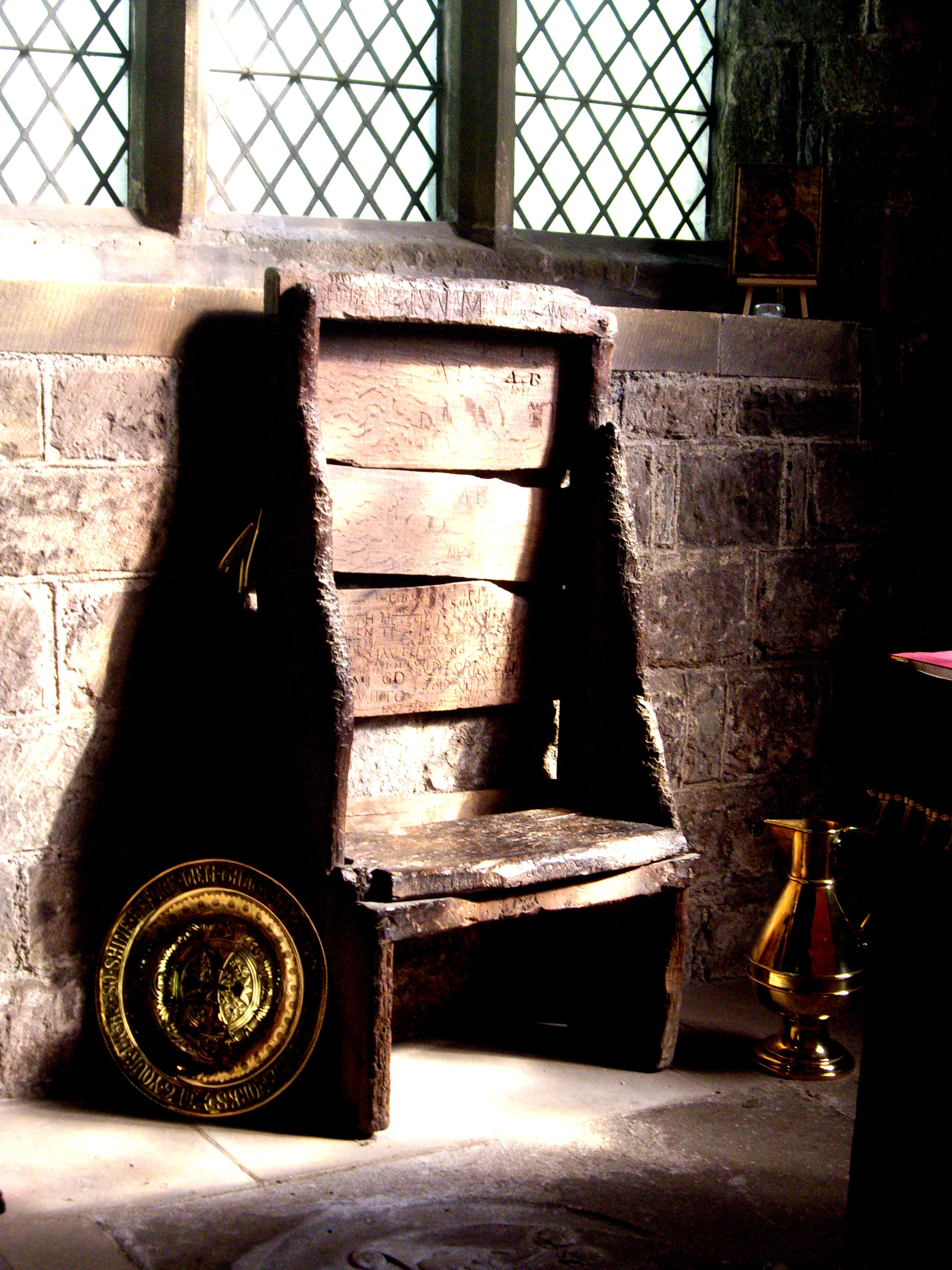
The so-called 'Bede's Chair'

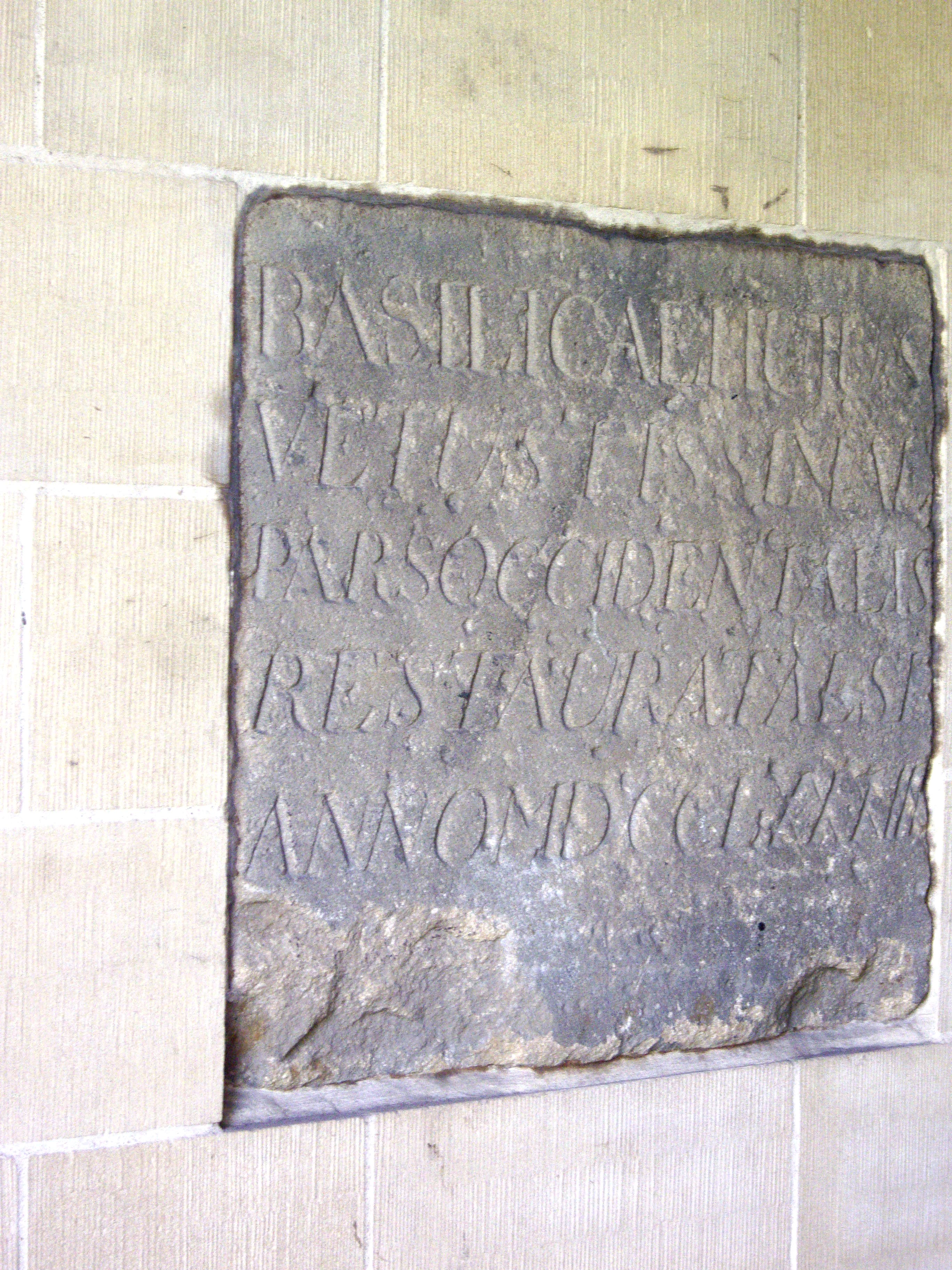
Stone from 1783 marking a restoration (lines 4 & 5, "RESTAURAT... ANNO MDCCLXXXIII")

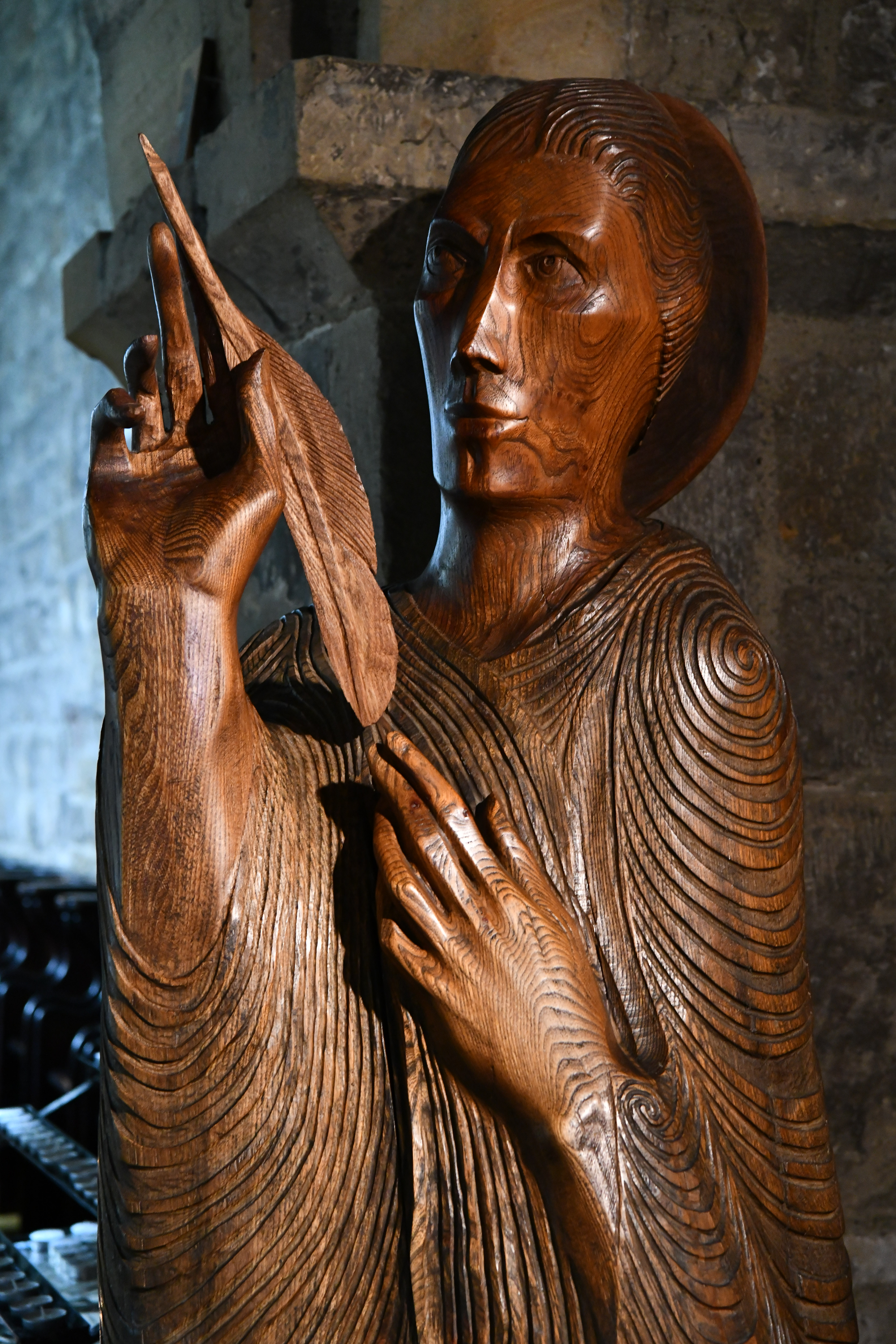
"The Venerable Bede" carving by Fenwick Lawson

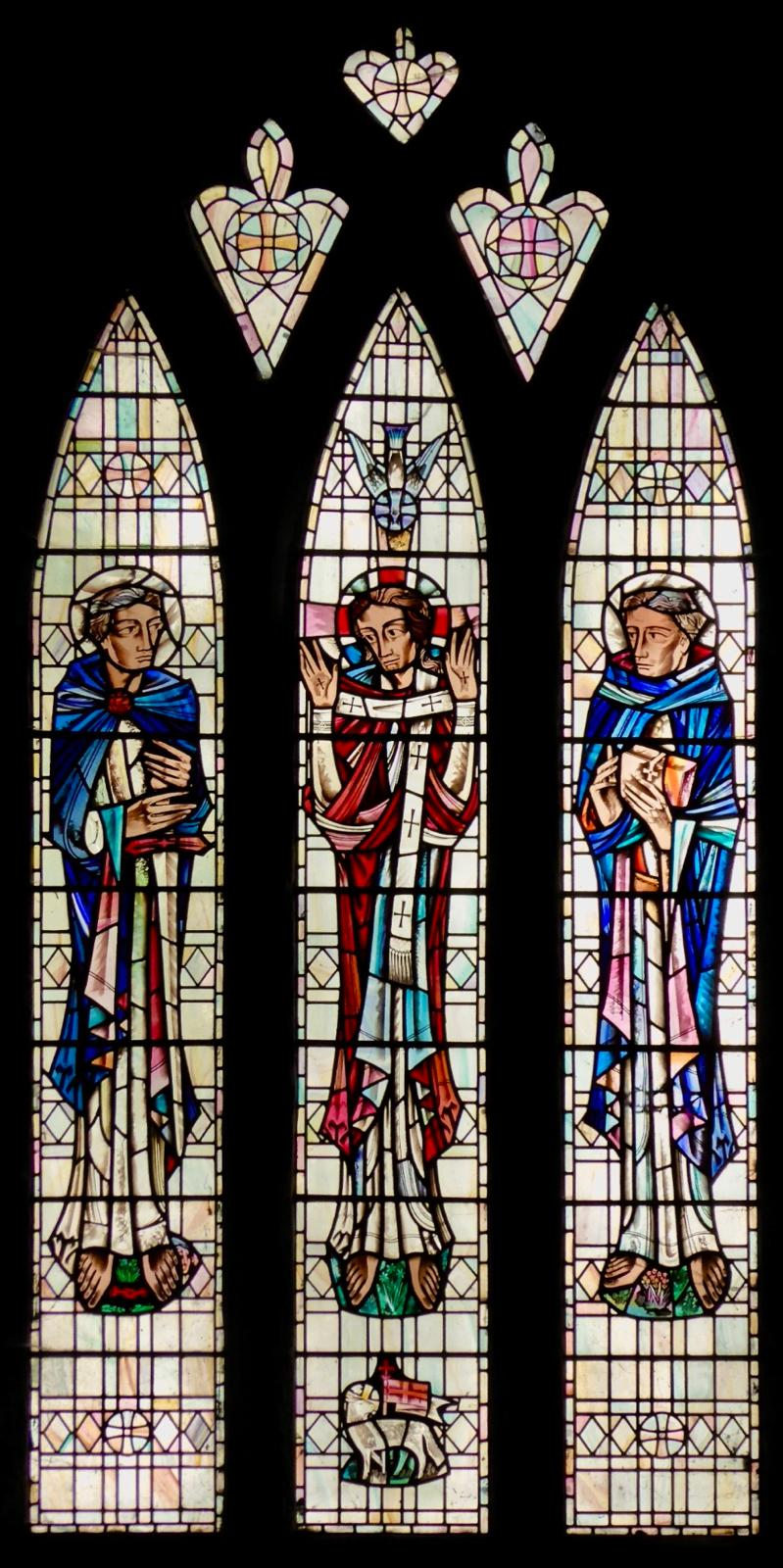
Chancel window by Leonard Evetts

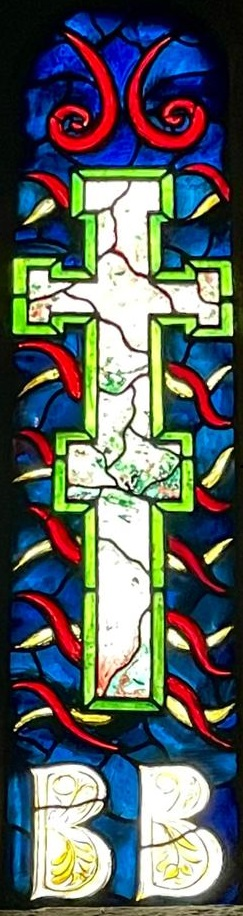
Chancel window by John Piper

== Other references ==
- Boyle, J. R. (1887). Hand-book to the Church and Monastery of St Paul, Jarrow: with a short account of the life of the Venerable Bede. Newcastle-on-Tyne: W. Scott.
- Colgrave, Bertram (1959). A Guide to St Paul's Church, Jarrow, and its Monastic Buildings. Gloucester.
- Cramp, R.J. (1976). "St Paul's Church, Jarrow". In Addyman, P.V.; Morris, R. (eds.). The Archaeological Study of Churches. Council for British Archaeology Research Report. Vol. 13. Nottginham: Derry and Sons. pp. 28‑36. ISBN 0900312351.
- Jenkins, Simon (2002). England's Thousand Best Churches. London: Penguin. ISBN 978-0140297959.
- Bede and his World: The Jarrow Lectures: Volume I: 1958-1978. Aldershot: Variorum. 1994. ISBN 978-0860784494.
- Bede and his World: The Jarrow Lectures: Volume II: 1979-1993. Aldershot: Variorum. 1994. ISBN 978-0860784494.
