= Mount Clara =

Mountain in South Georgia

Mount Clara (54°51′S 36°2′W) is a peak rising to about 790 metres (2,600 ft) to the east of Mount Normann and south of Larsen Harbour, in southeast South Georgia. It was charted and named by Discovery Investigations personnel in 1927.
