= Leonard Evetts =

British stained glass artist (1909–1997)

- Born: Leonard Charles Evetts; 12 January 1909; Newport, Wales, United Kingdom
- Died: 21 September 1997 (aged 88); Newcastle upon Tyne, United Kingdom
- Known for: Stained glass
- Notable work: Newcastle Cathedral, Durham Cathedral
- Style: Figurative modernism

Leonard Evetts (12 January 1909 – 21 September 1997) was a British stained glass artist, designer, and calligrapher whose ecclesiastical art can be found in churches across the UK, particularly in north east England. Over a career spanning more than 60 years, Evetts produced more than 400 stained glass windows, including works for Durham Cathedral and Newcastle Cathedral.

== Early life and education ==
Leonard Charles Evetts was born in Newport, Monmouthshire, Wales on 12 January 1909. He began his working life assisting his father in signwriting and lettering, rather than following a conventional academic route into art. This early training provided him with a grounding in craftsmanship that informed his later work. These skills subsequently won Evetts a scholarship to the Royal College of Art in London, where he studied stained glass design and manufacture under Martin Travers. At the RCA Evetts also developed his skills in calligraphy. This combination of practical and academic training shaped his approach to design, particularly his emphasis on structure and line.

== Career ==
Evetts’s professional career was closely linked to art education. In 1933 he was appointed to the staff of Edinburgh College of Art and moved to Scotland. His stay in Edinburgh lasted only until 1937, when he accepted a teaching position at the newly formed King’s College, Newcastle. The move was a defining one for Evetts. He would remain in the area for the rest of his life, an adopted home with which he would become closely associated. Before establishing himself primarily as a stained glass artist, Evetts gained early recognition as a calligrapher. His 1938 publication Roman Lettering established his reputation as an authority on letterform. This expertise informed much of his later output, including his stained glass, where linear composition and inscriptional elements played a significant role.

During the Second World War, Evetts would put his design skills to war use, advising the British armed forces on camouflage techniques. After the war Evetts established a productive commercial workshop designing and producing stained glass to commission. The immediate post-war period was a productive one for stained glass artists throughout the UK given the widespread renewal of religious and civic buildings following the destruction of The Blitz. In the north east of England, Newcastle, Sunderland and Middlesbrough had all suffered heavily from enemy bombing. Evetts's workshop, based in Newcastle, became the leading regional practice, and the majority of Evetts's works are to be found in the area. Over a period of more than 40 years, he designed and fabricated more than 400 windows, placing him among the most prolific of British artists working in the medium in the 20th century.

In 1963 – the same year that King's College became Newcastle University – Evetts was promoted to become Head of the School of Design. It was a position he would hold until his retirement in 1974.

In addition to stained glass, Evetts worked throughout his career across a wide range of media, including Watercolor painting, Metalworking, textiles, and commercial design. His versatility reflected a broader identity as a multidisciplinary artist. Evetts was also active in the conservation and oversight of church art. He served as vice chairman of the Council for the Care of Churches from 1972 to 1981 and advised on numerous ecclesiastical projects.

Evetts continued working into his later years, maintaining a studio at home where he continued to produce designs until shortly before his death on 21 September 1997. His archive is held at Newcastle University.

== Major works ==
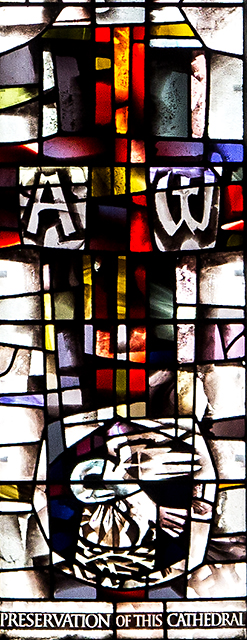
Ascension window – detail, Newcastle Cathedral (1963)

Evetts's major commissions include windows for the Anglican cathedrals in both Newcastle and Durham. His principal contribution to Newcastle Cathedral is the five-light east window in the Chapel of the Ascension, installed in 1963 in thanksgiving for the cathedral’s survival during the Second World War, replacing glass lost to wartime damage. The composition depicts the Ascension of Christ across the central lights, flanked by Old Testament imagery, and is unified by a large chalice motif that alludes to the Eucharist while also evoking wartime associations in its form. Stylistically, it is typical of Evetts’ characteristic balance of figurative and abstract elements, with restrained colour and strong lead lines that emphasise interplay of light rather than dense pictorial detail.

At Durham Cathedral, Evetts’ Stella Maris window in the Galilee Chapel was dedicated in 1993 as part of the cathedral’s 900th anniversary celebrations. It is a late work: Evetts was 83 when it was installed. Rich in iconographic detail, the two-part composition juxtaposes the Virgin Mary, under the “Star of the Sea”, with scenes from Christ’s ministry in Galilee, unified by a flowing representation of water linking the lights and symbolising both geography and theology.

The largest single collection of Evetts's work in stained glass is found at the Church of St Nicholas, Bishopwearmouth, in Sunderland. Over a period of 40 years, he provided a complete glazing scheme comprising 46 individual windows, with designs ranging from biblical themes, the lives of saints and Christian iconography, and pure abstraction. Installed between 1958 and 1998 they evidence the evolution of Evetts's style and practice during the course of his long career.

Among Evetts's other works are windows for both St Paul's Church, Jarrow and St Peter's Church, Monkwearmouth, the two successor churches to the early medieval Monkwearmouth–Jarrow Abbey, one of Northumbria’s most influential monastic centres. At Jarrow, Evetts created a new east chancel window to replace glass lost during the Second World War, which was installed in 1951. At Monkwearmouth, stained glass by Evetts can be seen in both the east chancel window and north aisle. Installed in 1969, the windows depict northern saints associated with the monastery.

One of Evetts's largest single works was installed at St Agatha's Church, Sparkbrook in Birmingham in 1961, again replacing glass lost during Second World War bombing. The seven-light east chancel window depicts Jesus enthroned in Heaven surrounded by a multitude of saints and angels. In the lower righthand corner St Agatha is seen kneeling in prayer below the text and I fell at his feet and worshipped him.

== Style and practice ==
Evetts undertook all aspects of stained glass production himself, from design through to painting and fabrication of his windows. This required a high level of technical as well as artistic proficiency. His designs for glass – which generally combined bold colour and strong linear frameworks – were normally conceived in relation to their specific architectural settings and often form integrated visual schemes within a church. Evetts sort to emphasise the role of light within space, rejecting the heavier qualities associated with 19th century Gothic Revival glass in favour of a more luminous treatment that allowed natural light to animate the design and light the building within.

While many of Evetts's windows were designed for pre-existing buildings, his style was equally in keeping with contemporary post-war trends in church architecture, which leaned towards simplified modernist forms and the use of innovative construction materials such as reinforced concrete. As a result, Evetts was frequently commissioned by architects working on new or substantially rebuilt churches to provide them with integrated glazing schemes.

Like contemporaries such as Harry Stammers and John Hayward, Evetts designed in a predominantly figurative and symbolic style that satisfied the usual client preference for a high degree of narrative clarity. This approach resonated with the general public and came to be associated with the optimistic Festival of Britain style. However, it also meant that Evetts was rarely associated with the more avant garde trends in stained glass practiced by designers such as John Piper or Keith New and, as a result, was largely ignored by the art establishment.

== Selected works ==
- Church of St Paul, Jarrow
  - East chancel window – Christ with two saints (1951)
- Grimsby Minster
  - Lady chapel – five windows depicting the Magnificat (1954–1956)
- Church of St Nicholas, Bishopwearmouth, Sunderland
  - Complete glazing scheme of 46 individual windows relating biblical themes, the lives of saints, Christian iconography, and abstraction (1958–1998)
- Church of St Agatha, Sparkbrook, Birmingham
  - East chancel window – Christ Enthroned in Heaven (1961)
- Newcastle Cathedral
  - Chapel of the Ascension – Ascension window (1963)
- Church of St Peter, Monkwearmouth, Sunderland
  - East chancel window – Northern saints (1969)
  - Three windows in north aisle – Northern saints (1969)
- Church of St Wulfram, Grantham
  - Lady Chapel – Porter memorial window (1969)
- Durham Cathedral
  - Galilee Chapel – Stella Maris window (1993)

== Gallery ==
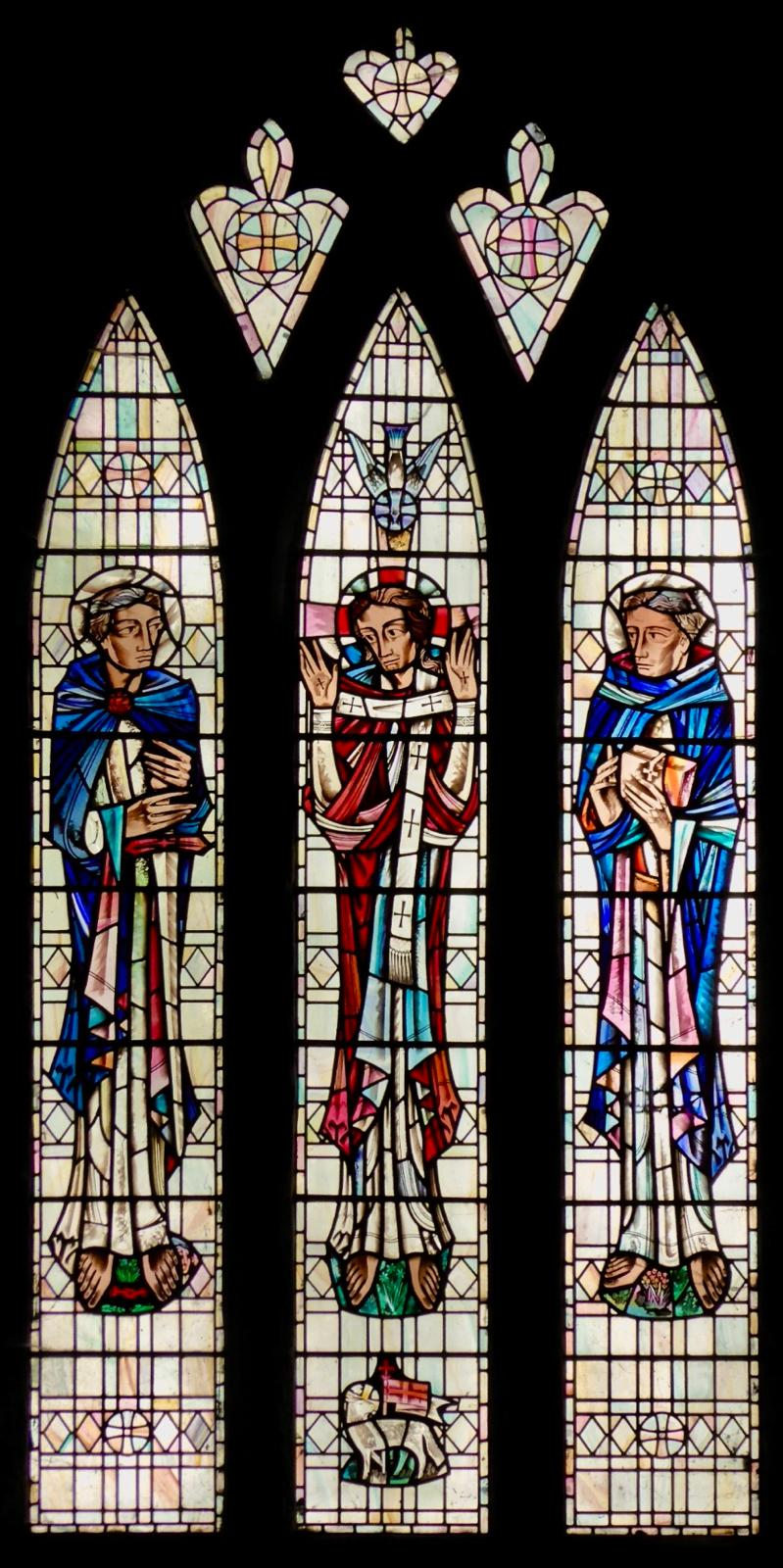
St Paul's Church, Jarrow

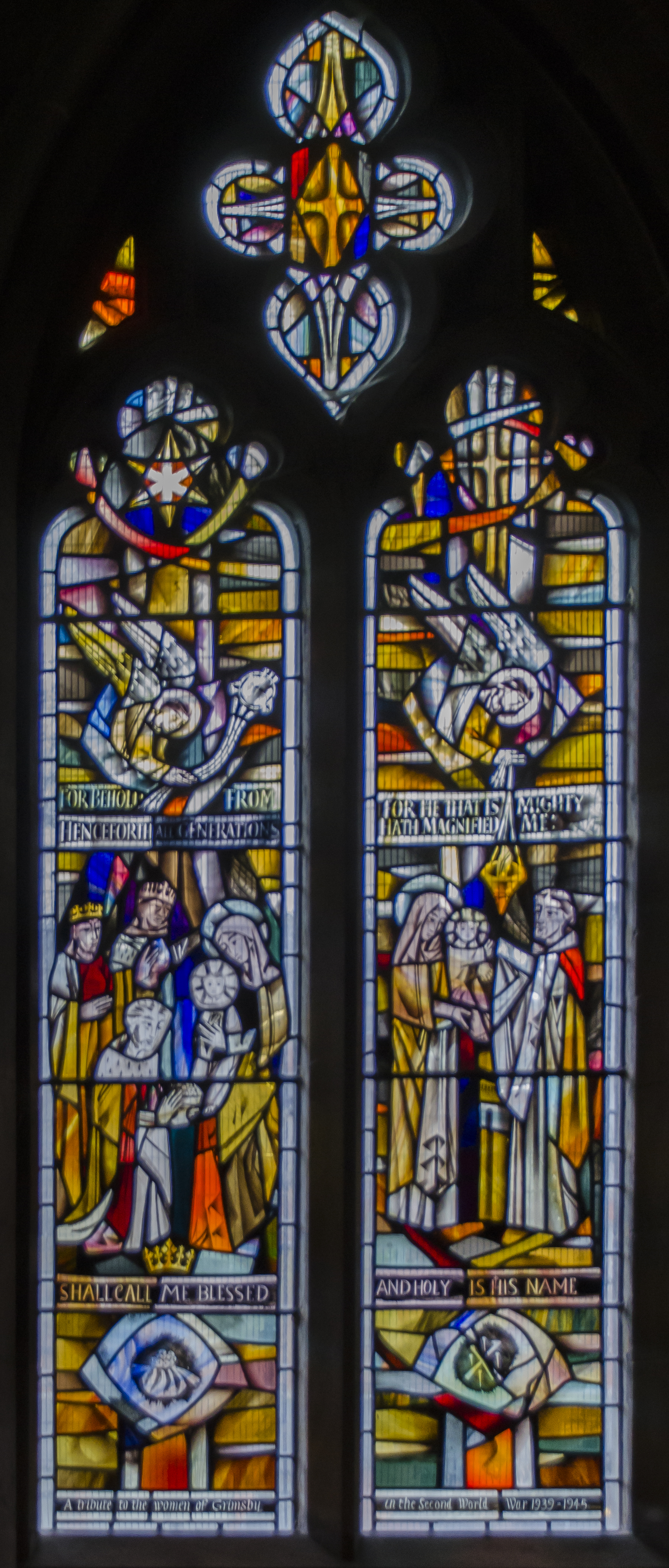
Grimsby Minster

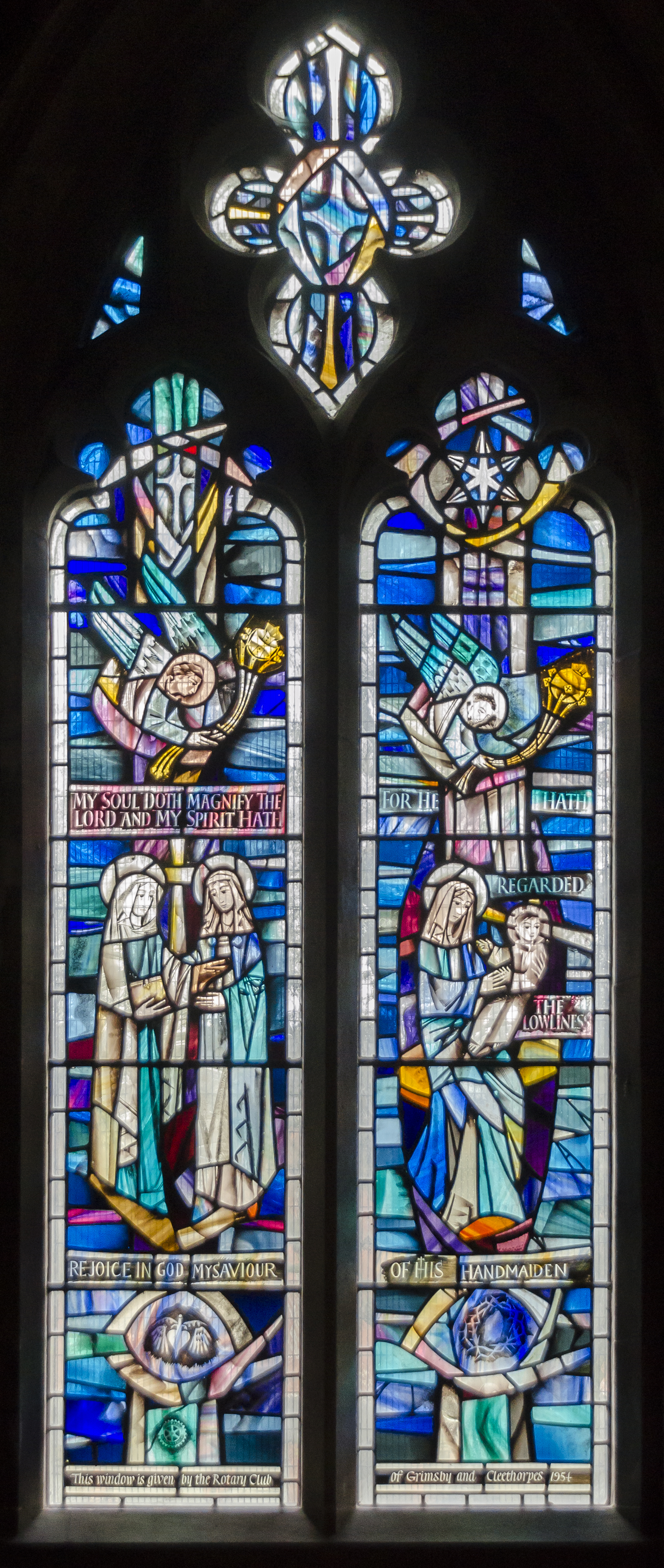
Grimsby Minster

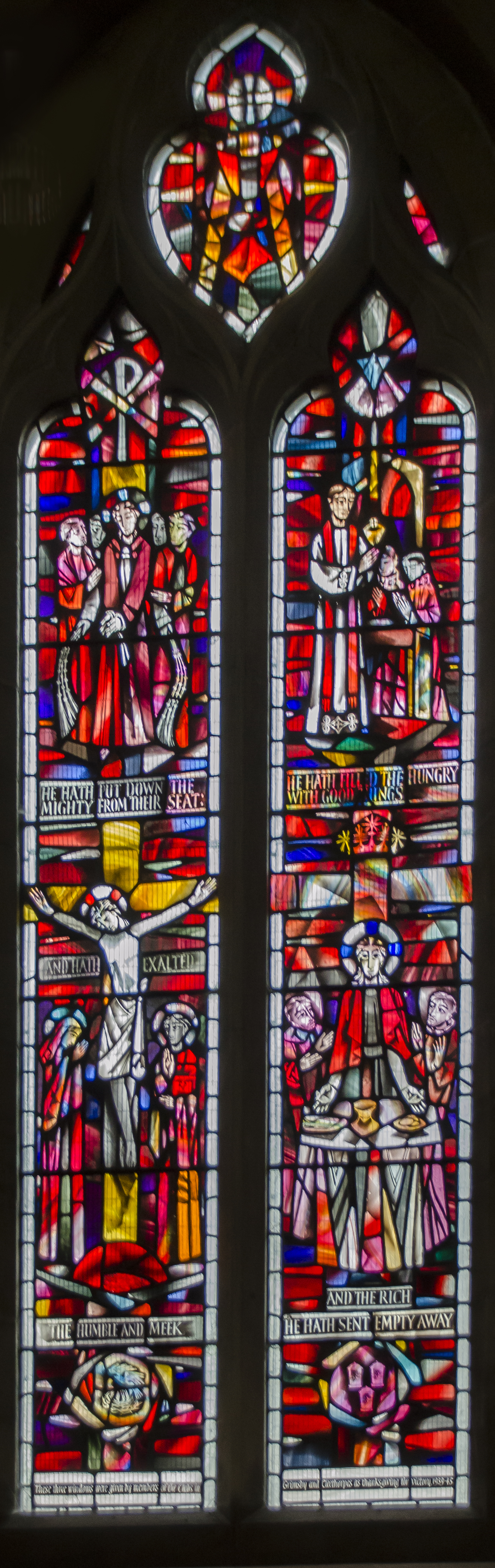
Grimsby Minster

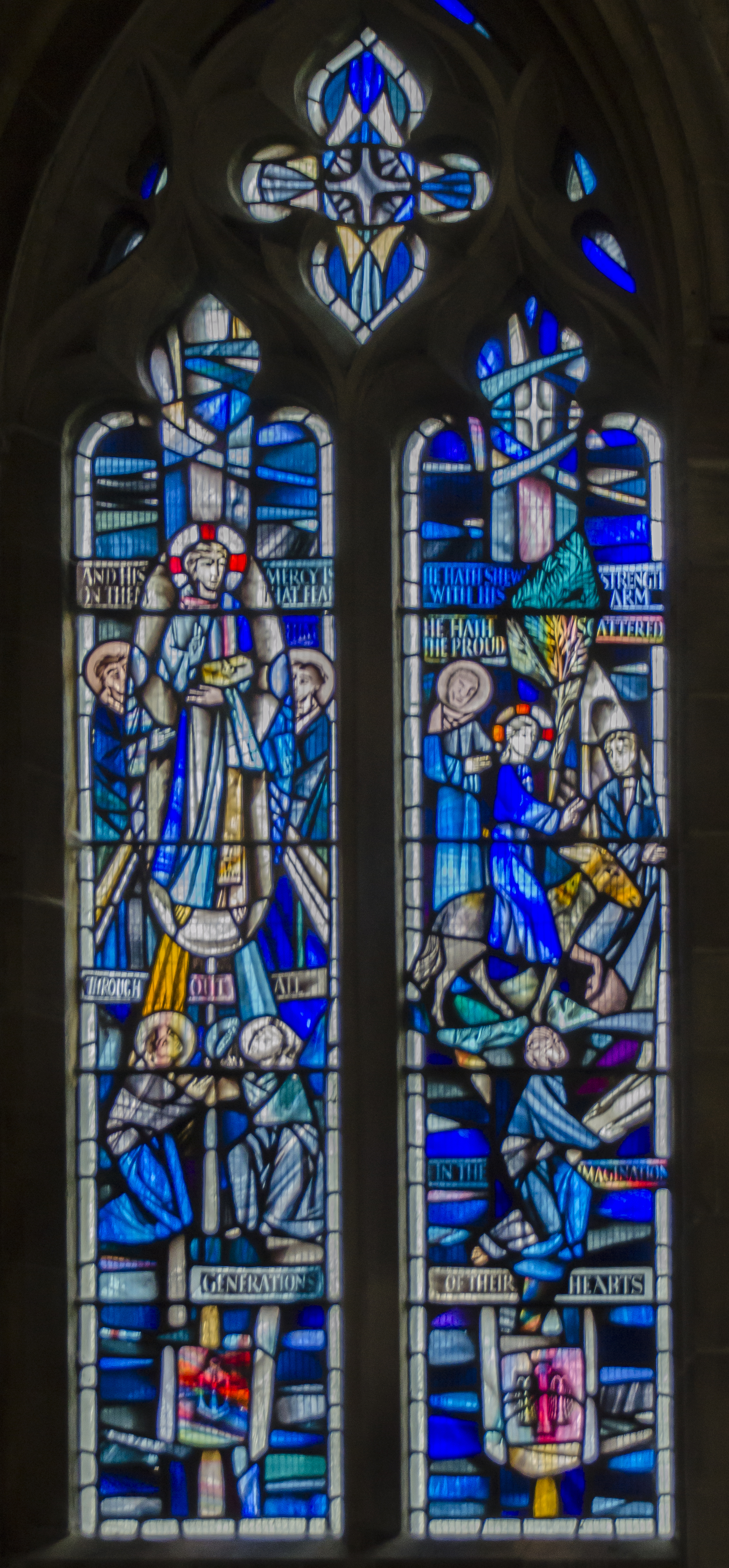
Grimsby Minster

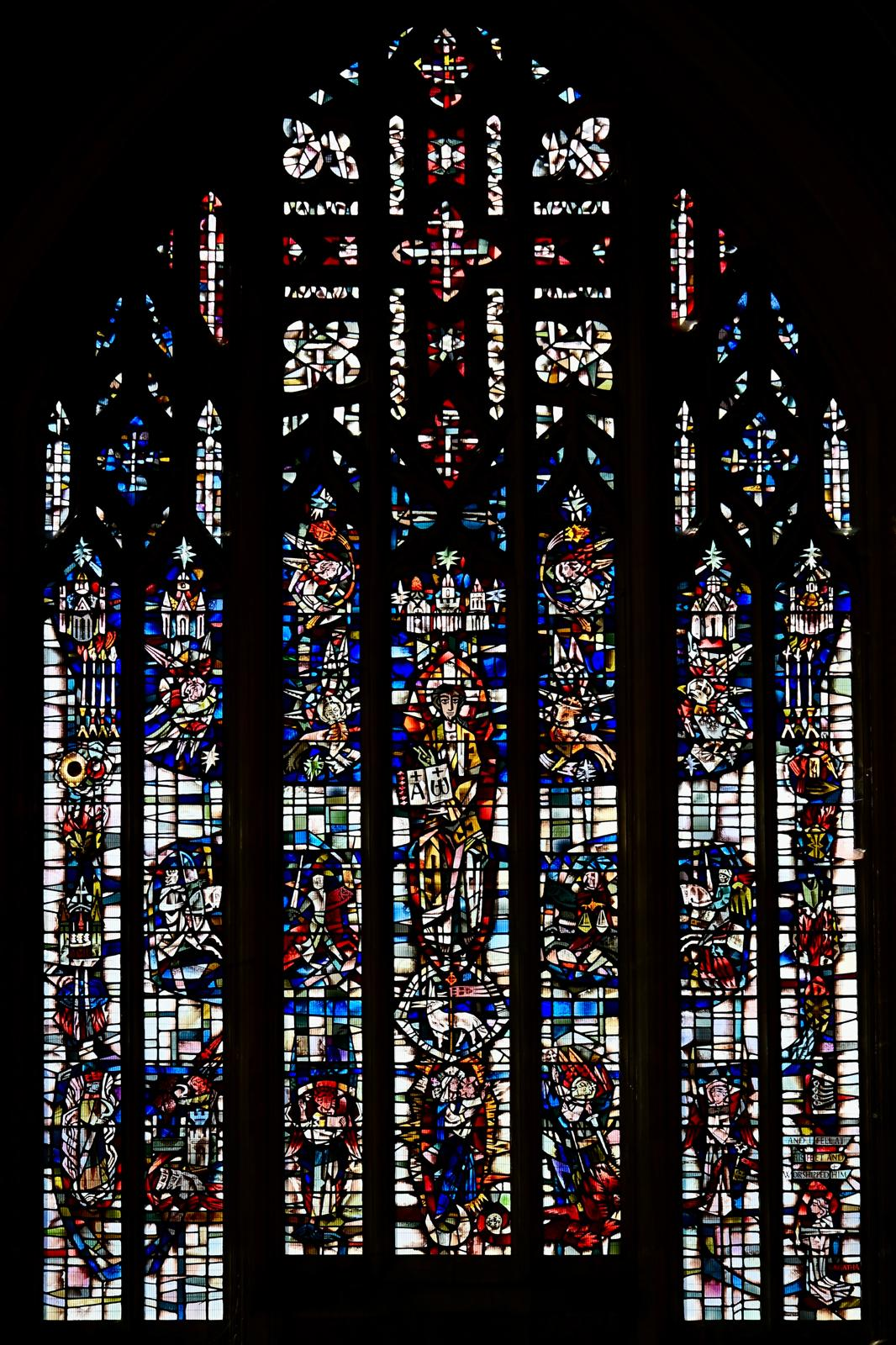
St Agatha's Church, Sparkbrook

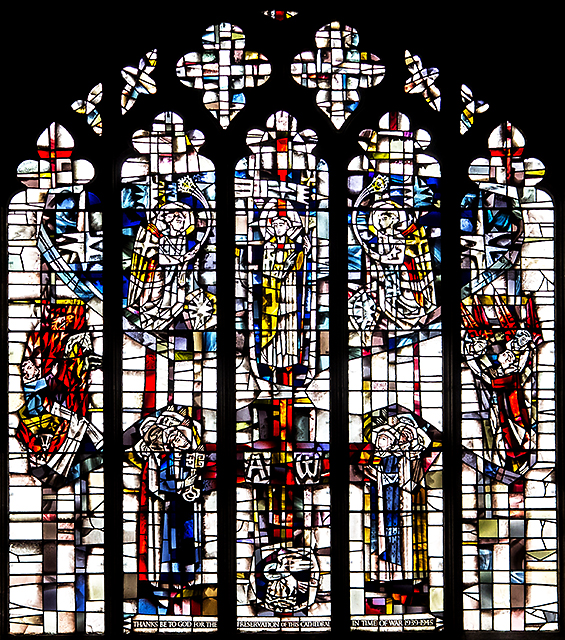
Newcastle Cathedral

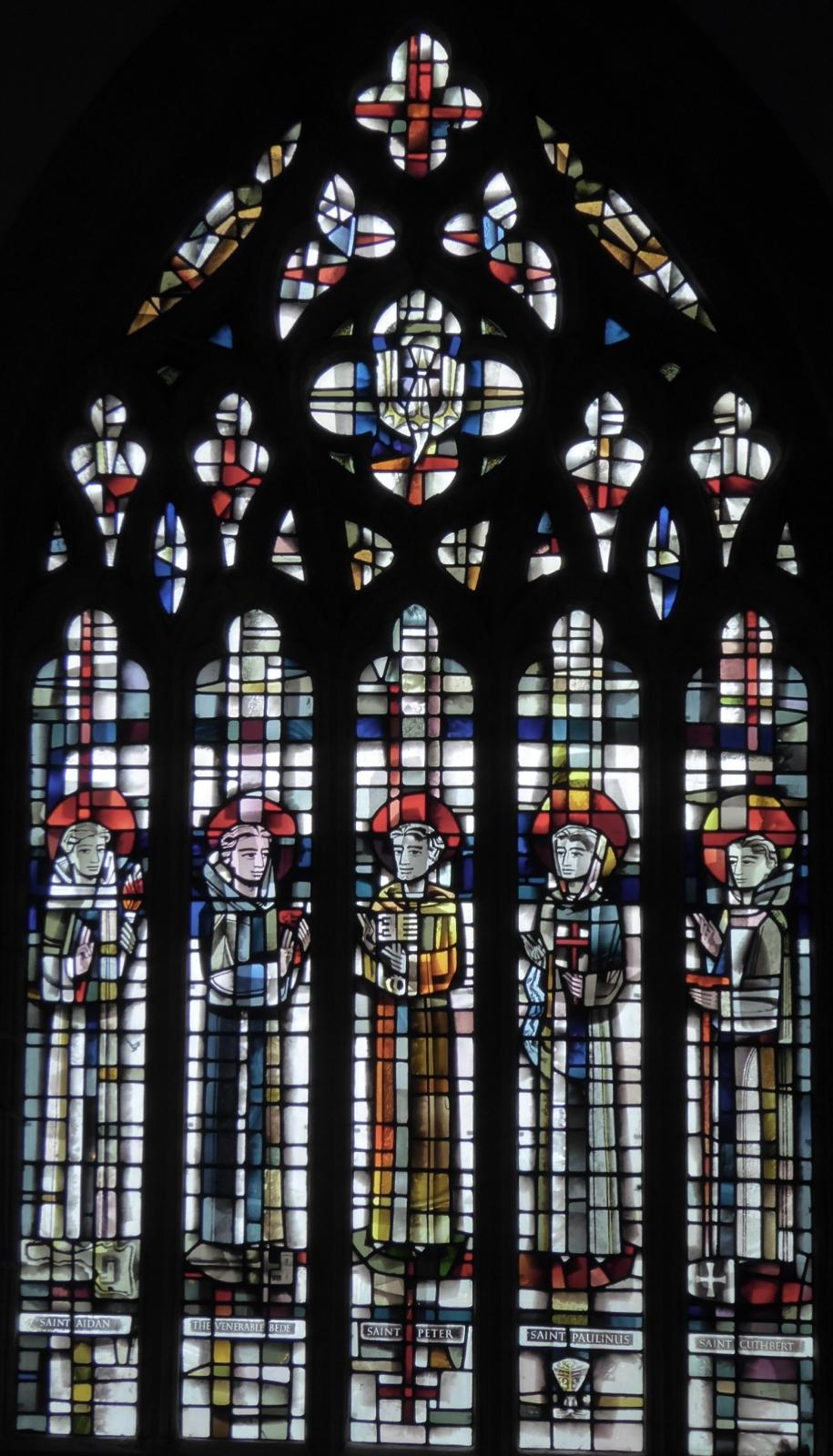
St Peter's Church, Monkwearmouth

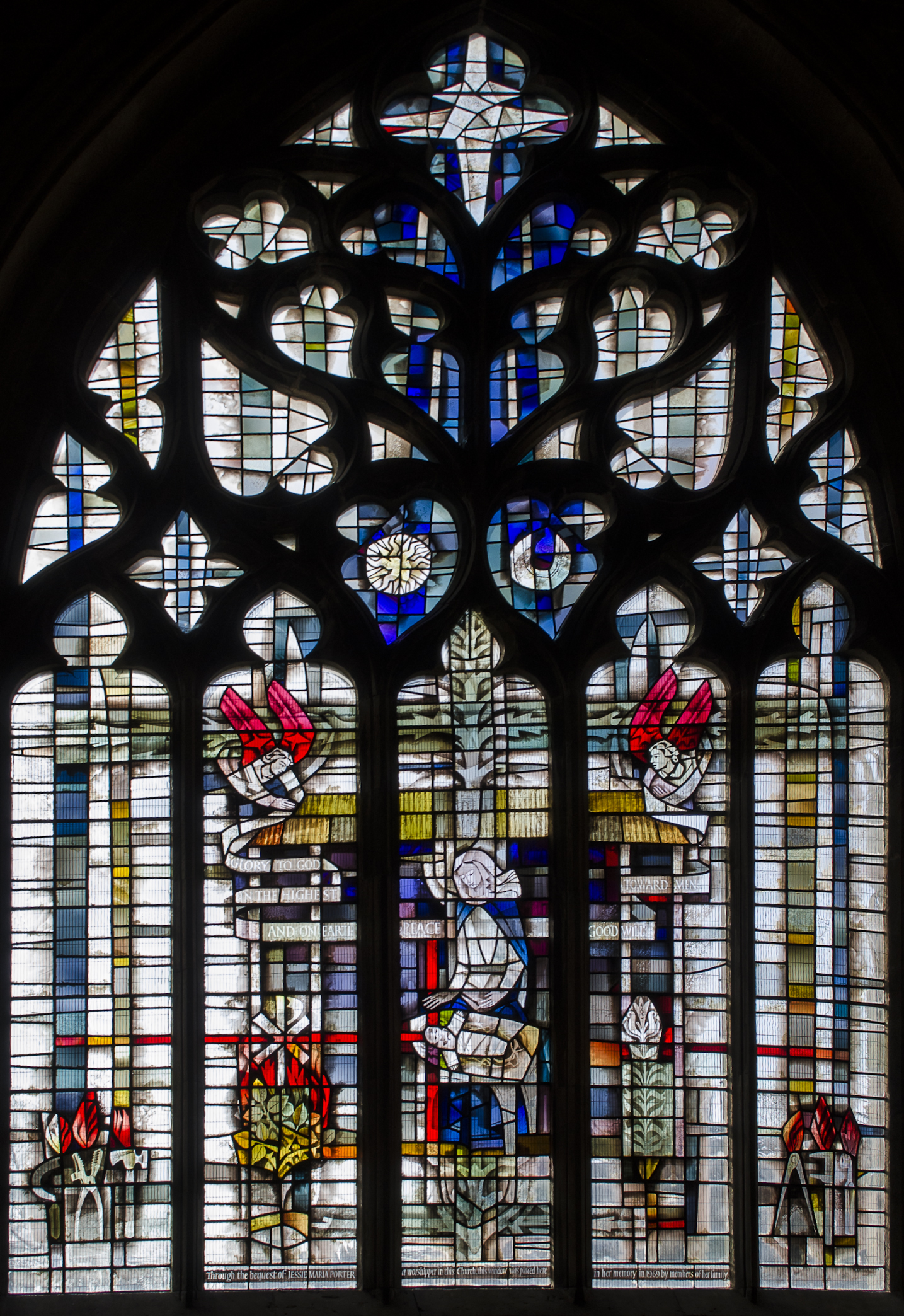
St Wulfram's Church, Grantham

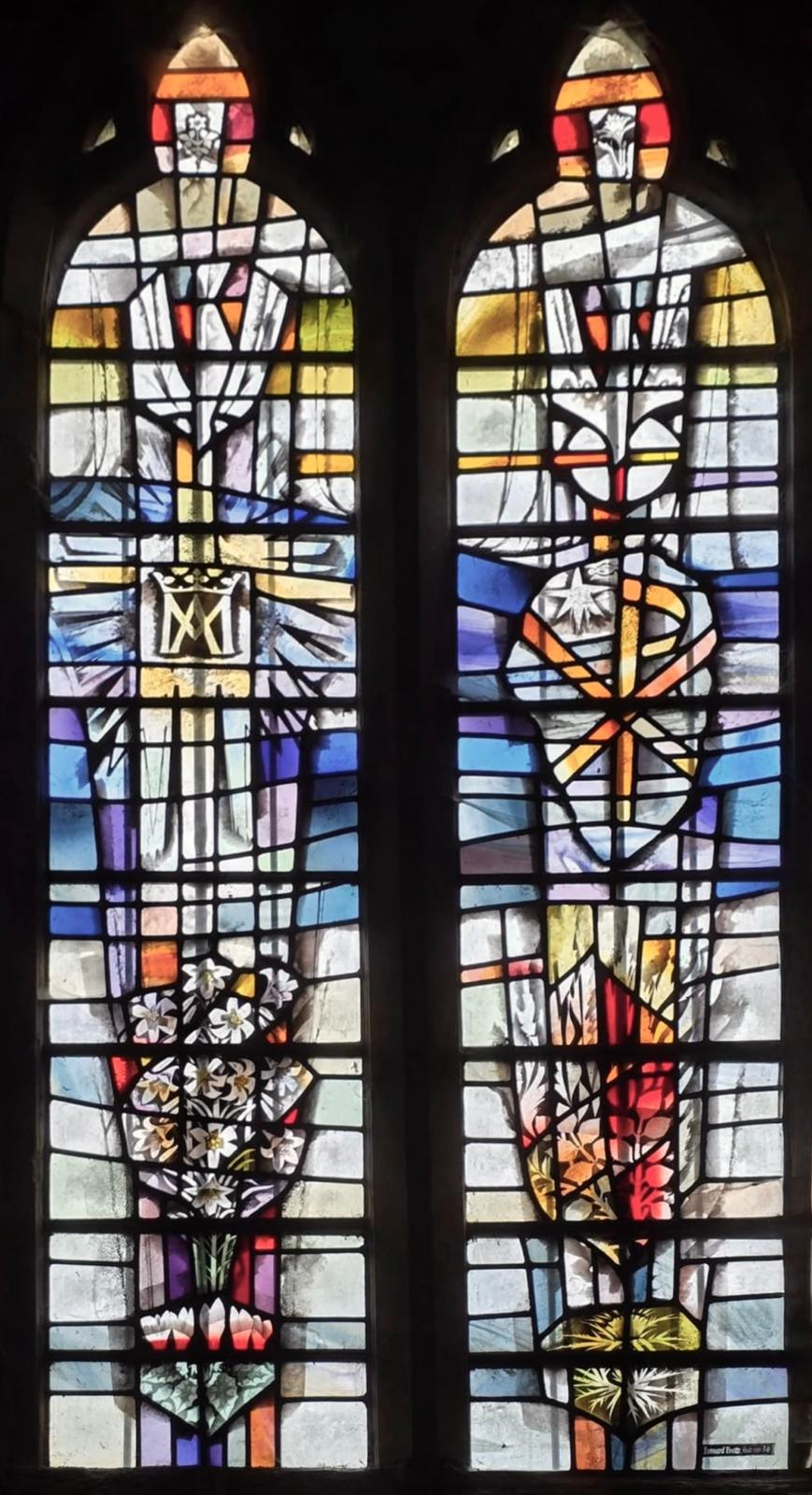
Durham Cathedral
