= Gerald Bonner =

British theologian (1926–2013)

Gerald Bonner FSA
- Born: Gerald Ian Bonner; 18 June 1926; London, England
- Died: 22 May 2013 (aged 86); Durham, England
- Spouse: Jane
- Children: 2

Academic background
- Education: Wadham College, Oxford

Academic work
- Discipline: Church History
- Sub-discipline: Patristics
- Institutions: University of Durham; The Catholic University of America

Gerald Bonner FSA (18 June 1926 – 22 May 2013) was a conservative Anglican Early Church historian and scholar of religion, who lectured at the Department of Theology of Durham University from 1964 to 1988. He was also an author and an internationally distinguished scholar of patristic studies.

== Early life ==
Gerald Ian Bonner was born in London in 1926. He was the child of Frederick John Bonner and Constance Emily Bonner. His father, an Indian Army veteran, died in 1931, as a result of injuries received in World War I. Constance was left to raise five-year-old Gerald and his three-year-old brother, Nigel Bonner, on a schoolteacher's salary.

Later in their lives, Gerald became a noted Early Church historian and scholar. Nigel became a zoologist, heading the Life Sciences Division of the British Antarctic Survey from 1974 to 1986, and retired as deputy director (1986 to 1988). Nigel was awarded the Polar Medal in 1987.

== Education and war service ==
At the age of ten, Bonner was awarded a scholarship to the Stationers' Company's School in Hornsey, where he was educated, from 1936 to 1944. However, in 1939, the school was evacuated to Wisbech for several years, due to World War II. It was during this period, as a thirteen-year-old schoolboy in 1939, that a sermon sparked Bonner's lifelong interest in St. Augustine.

In 1944, at the age of eighteen, he joined the Army, serving as a wireless operator in Palestine with the First King's Dragoon Guards before returning to England for officer training in 1947 and subsequently joining the regiment in its deployment to Libya.

In a continuation of his earlier interest, while in Tripoli, Bonner purchased a 1930 Turin reprint of St. Augustine's Confessions, which included notes by a seventeen-century German Jesuit, Heinrich Wangnereck.

After demobilization and a year of civilian employment, Bonner received an ex-serviceman's university grant making it possible for him to attend Wadham College, Oxford, where he studied modern history with Pat Thompson from 1949 to 1952 . and was awarded First Class Honours. Although it was uncommon at the time, to engage in further studies, from 1952 to 1953 he undertook postgraduate research supervised by Fr. Thomas Corbishley, Master of Campion Hall (1945–1958), the Jesuit hall of studies at Oxford.

== British Museum ==
England was still suffering from the effects of the war, and twenty-seven year-old Bonner required employment. As the result of a "rare opportunity", he left Oxford for London, to work in the Department of Manuscripts at the British Museum.

Bonner worked with the Department of Manuscripts at the British Museum, from 1953 until 1964, serving under Bertram Schofield and Theodore Cressy Skeat. The opportunity to work with such a fine collection of manuscripts, and with the noted scholars on staff, was indeed, a "rare opportunity". However, there were frustrations, due to the backlog of uncataloged manuscripts which had accumulated during the war years. As a result, the staff were obliged to spend most of their time cataloguing mundane collections. One of his colleagues at this time was Janet Backhouse, an authority in the field of illuminated manuscripts.

Some of his more interesting cataloging responsibilities included a tenth century Greek manuscript of the orations of the Cappadocian Father, St. Gregory Nazianzen, a 4th-century Archbishop of Constantinople, and theologian.

Bonner also cataloged the letters of David Livingstone, a Christian missionary, and explorer of Africa. It was Livingstone's meeting with Henry Morton Stanley on 10 November 1871 that gave rise to the popular quote, "Dr. Livingstone, I presume?"

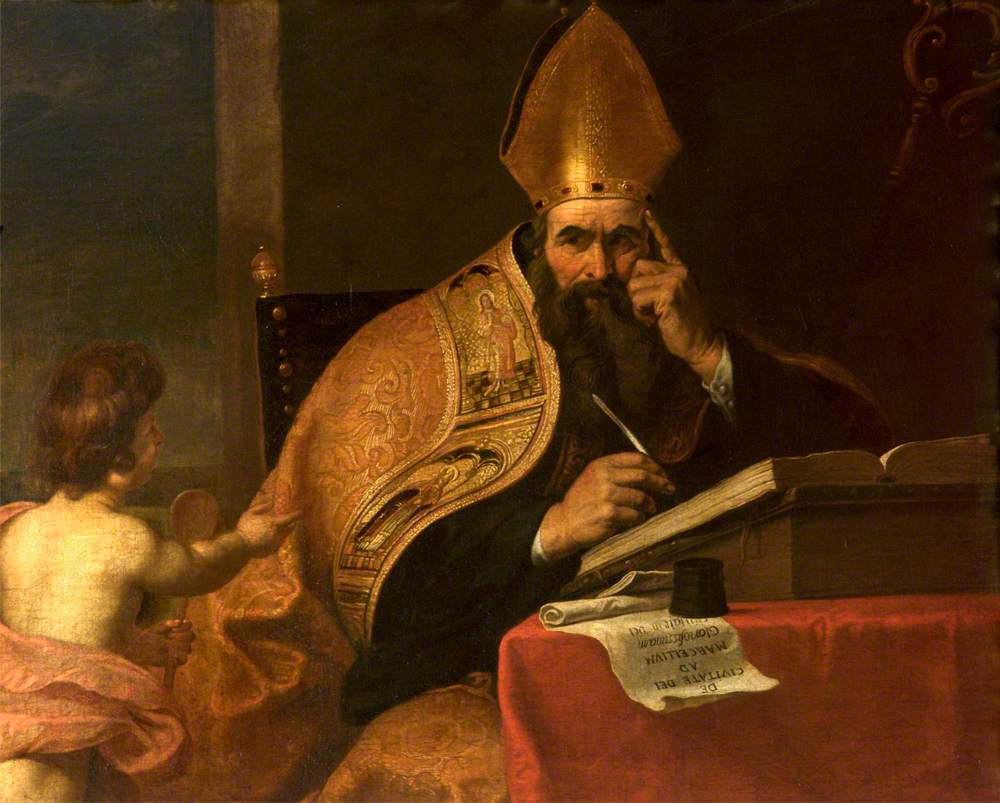
Saint Augustine of Hippo (354–430) The Four Doctors of the Western Church, by Gerard Seghers (1591–1651)

The Crum Papers, of Walter Ewing Crum, proved of particular interest to Bonner, because of Crum's work compiling an authoritative Coptic dictionary. Coptic, the latest stage of the language of ancient Egypt, is still spoken liturgically in the Coptic Orthodox and Coptic Catholic Church

In addition to his duties at the Museum, Bonner found time to pursue independent scholarship, and publish his first scholarly essays.

Bonner's interest in St. Augustine, sparked at the age of thirteen, came to fruition when, in 1963, he published his seminal study, St. Augustine of Hippo: Life and Controversies, the first of his published works on this important Church Father. The "Church Fathers" were ancient and influential Christian theologians and writers who established the intellectual and doctrinal foundations of Christianity.

== Durham University ==
=== Department of Theology ===
While attending the Oxford Patristic Conference of 1963, Bonner chanced to meet Hugh Turner, an Anglican priest, theologian, and academic. Turner invited him to apply for a lecturership at Durham University. He joined the Theology Department at Durham in 1964, and served as resident historian, and teacher of church history until 1988. During this time, he was promoted to the rank of Reader of Theology in recognition of his high standard of scholarship.

As of 1964, the Department of Theology was heavily oriented to biblical studies. Bonner's appointment represented an attempt by the university to expand expertise in early Church history. As a result, by the early 1970s, both Church History and Theology had become accepted tracks for Durham theology students. Bonner's "option" for Augustine of Hippo in the Honours School of Theology was continued by his successor, Carol Harrison, a theologian and ecclesiastical historian, specialising in Augustine of Hippo.

At the beginning of Bonner's tenure, the Department of Theology was "housed" in scattered rooms in different buildings. As the department grew, it acquired additional faculty members, many of whom were laypeople. It was necessary to consolidate, and to establish a departmental building.

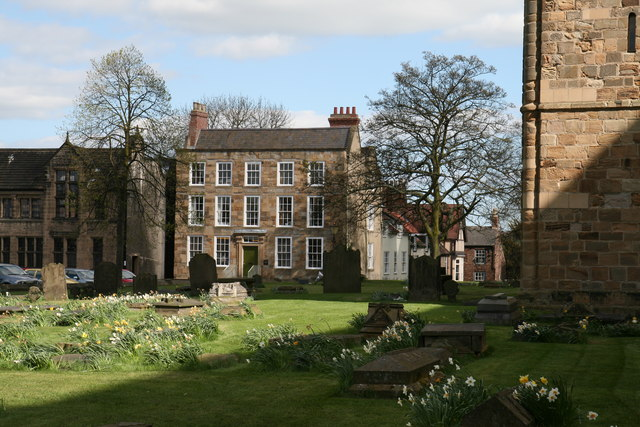
Abbey House

As a result of this growth, the historic Abbey House, near the cathedral, was designated to house the newly enlarged Department of Theology. Bonner moved from his old office, (a former shop on the Bailey) and established his new office in the Abbey House.

=== St. Bede and St. Cuthbert ===
Durham Cathedral is a magnificent edifice and is regarded as one of the finest examples of Norman architecture in Europe. In 1986, the cathedral, together with the nearby Castle, became a World Heritage Site. Within the outward grandeur of the cathedral, are housed the mortal remains of two figures who were highly influential in the development of Christianity in the North of England. Durham Cathedral hosts the tomb of St. Bede and of St. Cuthbert, both of whom are northern saints.

Some of Bonner's theological work at the university was involved with the study of Bede and Cuthbert.

St. Bede, or the Venerable Bede, a Benedictine monk, was one of the greatest teachers and writers of the Early Middle Ages, and an important scholar and historian.

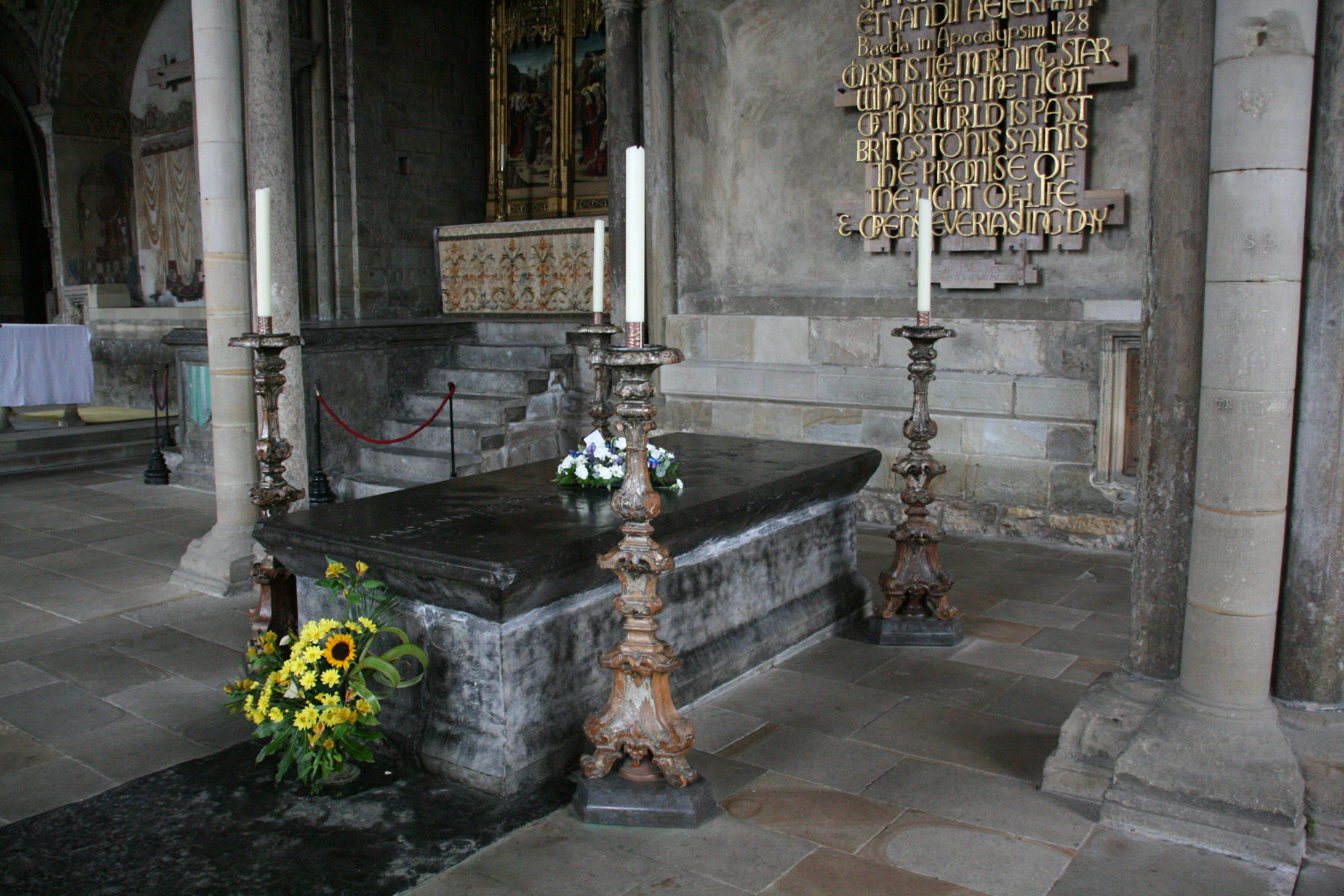
Shrine of the Venerable Bede, in Durham Cathedral; Bonner selected the quotation which is displayed on the wall above the saint's tomb.

Bonner's work on St. Bede (buried in the Galilee Chapel of the cathedral) reflected the fact that in 1964, early Northumbrian history was taught only by an archaeologist, Rosemary Cramp. The literary products of Northumbrian culture received little scrutiny. Building on the work of the Durham antiquarian Bertram Colgrave, Bonner undertook to promote greater understanding beginning with his 1966 Jarrow Lecture, entitled St. Bede in the Tradition of Western Apocalyptic Commentary. Bede's life and work are celebrated through the annual Jarrow Lecture.

He organised the Bedan Conference of 1973, authored the catalogue for the 1974 Sunderland Exhibition on Bede, and edited a book of essays for the thirteenth centenary of Bede in 1976. His edits of the proceedings, were presented under the title "Famulus Christi". Later he selected (at the request of Canon Douglas Jones, the Lightfoot Professor of Divinity) a quotation from Bede's work to be displayed above Bede's tomb.

Bonner also originated courses on St. Cuthbert, the most important medieval saint of Northern England, with a cult centred on his tomb at Durham Cathedral. Cuthbert is also regarded as the patron saint of Northumbria. Bonner presented a paper for the Cuthbert Conference of 1987, published as St. Cuthbert, His Cult and His Community to A.D. 1200.

Because he wished to ensure the appointment of a successor to his position, he decided to retire early, in 1988.

== St. Augustine ==
Despite his other scholarly works, the study of St. Augustine remained as a primary interest. During his tenure at Durham, he continued to produce articles concerning Augustine, and was requested to write about Augustine for dictionaries, lexicons and encyclopedias. A collection of essays, God's Decree and Man's Destiny. Studies on the thought of Augustine of Hippo was published in 1987. Church and Faith in the Patristic Tradition: Augustine, Pelagianism, and Early Christian Northumbria was published in 1996.

== The Catholic University of America ==
Bonner served as Distinguished Visiting Professor of Early Christian Studies at the Catholic University of America, located in Washington, D.C., from 1990-1994. The university is the only institution of higher education founded by U.S. Catholic bishops.

During this period, he taught courses on Augustine, Bede, and the Desert Fathers. His family moved to America to join him in Washington, D.C., after the first year. At the end of his stay at CUA, he was presented with the Johannes Quasten Prize for leadership and excellence, an award named for a patristic scholar.

== Fellowship of St. Alban and St. Sergius ==
During his time at Durham University, Bonner also worked to support the Fellowship of St. Alban and St. Sergius (founded in 1928), and built connections with prominent Anglican and Orthodox churchmen.

In 1970, when the Fellowship was obliged at short notice to discontinue its annual summer conference at Broadstairs, a coastal town on the Isle of Thanet, he arranged for it to meet in Durham. During the conference, the Orthodox Liturgy of the Dormition was celebrated in the Galilee Chapel of Durham Cathedral, and Bonner delivered a paper on 'The Christian life of the Venerable Bede.'

Because of his work with the Fellowship of St. Alban and St. Sergius, Bonner maintained an association over the years with Eastern Orthodoxy. After his death, his entire patristic book collection was donated to the University of Sofia.

== Theological views ==
He was openly critical of the theological pronouncements of David Jenkins, whose elevation to the See of Durham in 1984 he felt obliged to protest. Jenkins' selection as Bishop of Durham was controversial due to allegations that he held heterodox beliefs, particularly regarding the virgin birth and the bodily resurrection.

On 26 May 1984, an editorial in The Times entitled "A Bishop's Beliefs", discussed the controversy concerning David Jenkins' public pronouncements. In the same issue appeared a letter from Gerald Bonner:

As a layman, with no sense of loyalty to the Establishment but with a conviction that the Anglican communion is part of the Church of Christ, I feel that I have a right to expect of my bishop the same acceptance of fundamental Christian belief that I have myself; and I know that I am not alone in this expectation. In so saying I do not wish to prejudge the question of Professor Jenkins's orthodoxy; but I cannot see why those of us who support the Church of England, a voluntary society which nowadays makes constantly increasing demands upon the pockets of its members, should be expected to accept without question those who are placed in authority over us without any consultation.

In response, another letter to The Times, 6 June 1984, addressed Bonner's statement. A chaplain of Exeter College disagreed, stating that he would not "disparage Mr. Bonner’s well advertised liberality", the writer wished to remind Bonner "that The Church of England is supported by a wide variety of other people. If he [Bonner] rattles his purse whenever his bishop offends him, he will deserve the hireling he seems to expect."

Jenkins' public pronouncements caused great disquiet, particularly within his own diocese. As a result of doubts concerning his elevation to bishop, a petition signed by more than 12,000 people was submitted to the Archbishop of York.

After reluctantly agreeing to stand for the General Synod of the Church of England in 1990, Bonner resigned his seat following his appointment to the CUA professorship.

== Civil liberties ==
In the United Kingdom, persons watching or recording live television are required to hold a television licence. "Enquiry agents" or inspectors, are allowed to investigate possible unlicensed viewing in a dwelling. However, the occupant is well within his/her rights to deny answering any questions (remain silent) and is under no obligation to allow entry into the property. If denied entry by the home's occupants, the agents obtain a search warrant, in order to enter.

As noted in his 15 January 1990 letter to The Times, Gerald Bonner did not own a television. For several years, he had maintained his legal right to refuse to answer inspector's questions. He stated: "Suspicion had been engendered by the fact that I had refused, over a period of several years, to answer inspectors' enquiries, since I did not see why I should have to deny possessing what I did not possess and did not want, when I was not legally compelled to do so."

On 12 January 1990, two license inspectors, along with two police officers, arrived to search his home. The warrant that they produced was "inadequatedly dated", as it did not state the year, and furthermore, was only valid for one month. Bonner stated: "It would appear that those who enforce law and order do not apply their principles to their own affairs."

In the letter, he said that "most disturbing aspect of the affair", in his opinion was that: "...in Britain at the end of the 20th century, not to own a television receiver automatically makes an individual an object of suspicion and subject to investigation."

== Legacy ==
Bonner maintained an association over the years with Eastern Orthodoxy, through the Fellowship of St. Alban and St. Sergius. In 2016, in accordance with his wishes, Bonner's entire patristic book collection, amassed for more than fifty years, was donated to the University of Sofia, in Bulgaria. It now resides at the Patristic Library of the Library of Theology Faculty at Sofia University.

In 2019, Catholic University Department of History announced a grant in Bonner's honour, the Gerald Bonner Graduate Research Award. They noted that Bonner was "an internationally distinguished scholar of patristic studies", who published several important works.

== Personal life ==
Gerald Bonner married Jane Hodgson in 1967. Jane was a philologist educated at Bedford College, London and taught Early and Middle High German at the University of Sheffield. During their marriage she assisted Bonner, a self-taught reader of German, with his understanding of theological German and was instrumental in organising the Bedan Conference of 1973.

They had two children, Jeremy and Damaris. Jeremy Bonner is also a scholar of theology and religion.

Gerald Bonner died on 22 May 2013, at the age of eighty-six.

== Awards ==
Johannes Quasten Prize for leadership and excellence. Presented by the Catholic University of America

== Works ==
- Bonner, Gerald (1962). The Warfare of Christ. Faith Press.
- Bonner, Gerald (1963). St Augustine of Hippo: Life and Controversies. SCM Press.
- Bonner, Gerald (1966). Saint Bede in the tradition of Western apocalyptic commentary, Jarrow lecture.
- Bonner, Gerald (1987). God's Decree and Man's Destiny. Studies on the thought of Augustine of Hippo. Variorum Reprints.
- Bonner, Gerald (1996). Church and Faith in the Patristic Tradition: Augustine, Pelagianism, and Early Christian Northumbria. Variorum Reprints.
- Bonner, Gerald (2007). Freedom and Necessity: St. Augustine's Teaching on Divine Power and Human Freedom. Catholic University of America Press. ISBN 978-0-8132-1474-0.
