= Bonner Beach =

Beach in South Georgia

Bonner Beach (54°50′S 36°1′W) is a small, flat beach on the south shore of Larsen Harbor in the southeast part of South Georgia. It is the only place in South Georgia where Weddell seals breed. The area was mapped by DI personnel in 1927 and by the South Georgia Survey in the period 1951–57, and named by the UK Antarctic Place-Names Committee in 1957 for William Nigel Bonner, Falkland Islands Dependencies Survey biologist who worked in the Bay of Isles in 1953–55 and was sealing inspector in South Georgia in 1956–57.
