= Larsen Harbour =

Inlet in South Georgia

Coordinates: 54°50′S 36°1′W

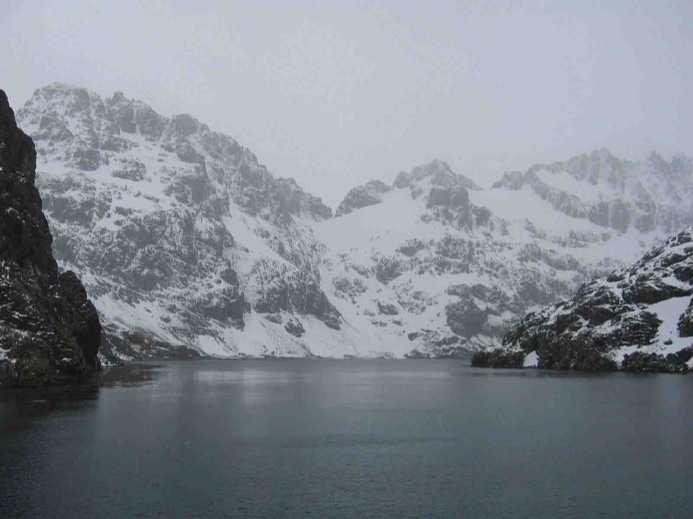
Entrance to Larsen Harbour

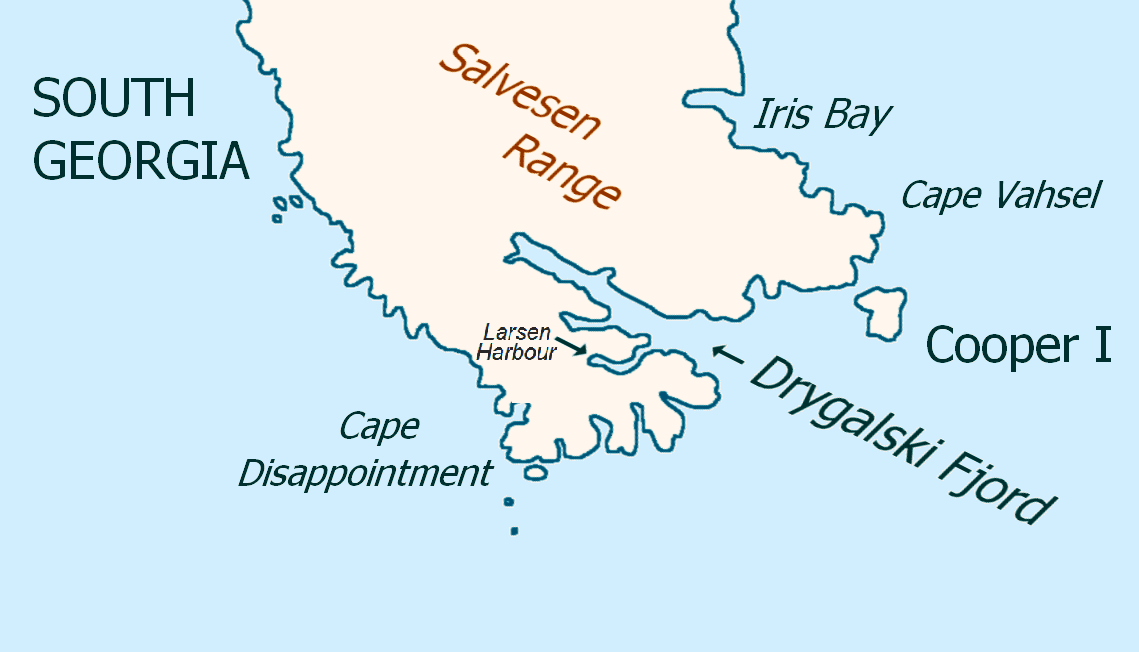
Map of Drygalski Fjord, South Georgia Island, with Larsen Harbour labelled

Larsen Harbour (Spanish: Bahía Larsen) is a narrow 2.6 miles (4.2 km) long inlet of indenting volcanic rocks and sheeted dykes known as the Larsen Harbour Formation. It is a branch of Drygalski Fjord, entered 2.5 miles (4 km) west-northwest of Nattriss Head, at the southeast end of South Georgia Island. It was charted by the Second German Antarctic Expedition, 1911–12, under Filchner, who named it for Captain Carl Anton Larsen a Norwegian explorer, who made significant contributions to the exploration of Antarctica. The most significant of these was the first discovery of fossils on the continent, for which he received the Back Grant from the Royal Geographical Society. Larsen is also considered the founder of the Antarctic whaling industry and the settlement and whaling station of Grytviken, South Georgia.

The peaks and mountain crests surrounding the almost land-locked harbour was described by Sir Ernest Shackleton's photographer Frank Hurley as "most beautiful and exceeding all in grandeur even that of Milford Sound".

The Niall Rankin expedition aboard the Albatross, spent some time here as they studied the Weddell seal colony before going on to Esbensen Bay.

The area is rat-free, allowing species such as the South Georgia pipit, and burrowing petrels and prions to thrive. Mountains descend steeply into the sea here, and various glaciers calve into the sea.

== Named locations ==
Hash Island lies in the entrance of the harbor. It was roughly surveyed by the German Antarctic Expedition of 1911–12, and probably named by Discovery Investigations personnel who re-surveyed it in 1927.

Williams Cove is a small cove in the north side of Larsen Harbor. The south point of its entrance is called Scoresby Point. Both names were first used on a 1929 British Admiralty chart.

Mount Clara and Mount Normann are found inland to the south of Larsen Harbour and Bonner Beach is on the south shore of the harbour.
