= Heinrich Wangnereck =

Chancellor of the University of Dillingen
- In office c. 1620–1664

Personal details
- Born: 1 July 1595 Munich, Duchy of Bavaria
- Died: 11 November 1664 (aged 69) Dillingen an der Donau, Duchy of Bavaria
- Occupation: Theologian, preacher, author

Heinrich Wangnereck (July 1595 – 11 November 1664) was a German Jesuit theologian, preacher, and author, recognized for his contributions to Catholic theology and his role in ecclesiastical education during the 17th century.

== Early life ==
Born in Munich, Wangnereck entered the novitiate of the Upper German Province of the Society of Jesus in Landsberg at the age of sixteen. Following the standard Jesuit formation, he also taught at the gymnasium level during his early years in the order.

== Academic career ==
Wangnereck served as a professor of philosophy and theology at the University of Dillingen, where he held the position of chancellor for approximately twenty-four years. His tenure was marked by significant contributions to theological education and active engagement in preaching.

== Later life and death ==
In 1655, Wangnereck was appointed superior and missioner in Lindau, a position he held for five years before returning to the University of Dillingen to resume his role as chancellor until his death on 11 November 1664 from a stroke.

== Contributions and legacy ==
Wangnereck authored approximately twenty theological works, addressing various doctrinal and political issues of his time, and his counsel was sought by various secular and ecclesiastical leaders across Germany. He authored approximately twenty works primarily focused on theological subjects. His first publication, “Notae in confessiones S. Augustini,” was released in 1630 and remain popular for many years; a fourth edition was published in 1907. He sometimes used pseudonyms, such as "Ernestus de Eusebiis."

He was also involved in political controversies of his time, which occasionally led to conflicts with authorities. Notably, he faced censure from the Jesuit General for making disrespectful remarks about the Duke of Bavaria.
