= Richard Morris (archaeologist) =

English archaeologist and historian

Richard Morris OBE
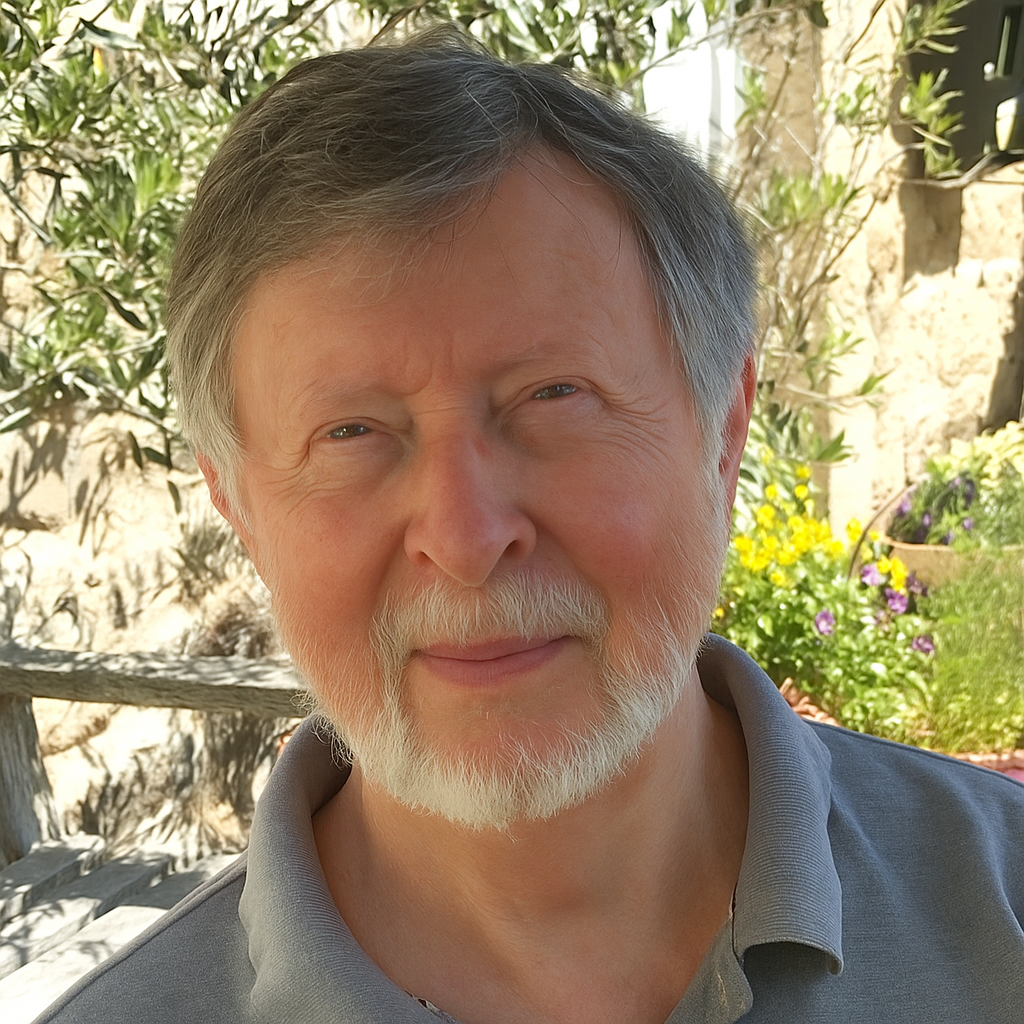
- Richard Morris in 2021
- Born: Richard Morris; 8 October 1947 (age 78)
- Occupations: Archaeologist, writer

Richard Morris, OBE (born 8 October 1947) is a British writer and archaeologist who explores landscape, the archaeology of churches and battlefields, and cultural and aviation history. He is a professor (emeritus) at the University of Huddersfield and a visiting fellow of the Institute for Medieval Studies at Leeds.

== Early life ==
Morris was born in Birmingham and grew up in north Worcestershire, where his father was the first vicar of the motor industry parish of Longbridge. He was educated at Denstone College in Staffordshire, Pembroke College, Oxford, and the University of York, where he studied composition.

== Career ==
Morris aimed initially at a career in music but turned to archaeology in 1971 as a member of the team excavating under York Minster. In 1975 he become the Churches Officer of the Council for British Archaeology (CBA), responsible for setting up archaeological advice networks for churches and cathedrals. In 1988 he joined the Department of Archaeology at the University of York. He returned to the CBA as its director in 1991, there helping to launch the popular magazine British Archaeology. From 2003 to 2010 he was director of the Institute for Medieval Studies at the University of Leeds, then moved to Huddersfield to join the university's Department of History.

Morris has served as a Commissioner of English Heritage and as a trustee of the National Heritage Memorial Fund, the National Coal Mining Museum for England, Bede's World in Jarrow, the York Archaeological Trust, The Blackden Trust and the Landscape Research Centre.

== Writing ==
Morris's interests in religion, settlement and cultural history are reflected in his books, essays and articles. Churches in the Landscape (1989) explores patterns of parish church distribution and asks why places of worship occupy the sites they do. Time's Anvil: England, Archaeology and the Imagination (2012), Yorkshire (2018) and Evensong (2021) are a trio of books in which events from his and his family’s lives are put in conversation with larger and longer narratives. Time’s Anvil was long-listed for the Baillie Gifford Prize (then the Samuel Johnson Prize) and shortlisted for Current Archaeology’s Book of the Year Award.

Morris has also written about the air war in the 20th century, including biographies of Guy Gibson VC DSO DFC (1994), Leonard Cheshire VC OM (2000), and Sir Barnes Wallis (2023).

== Collaborations ==
While at Leeds, Morris worked with the archaeologist Glenn Foard to produce an archaeological resource assessment of English battlefields. The project, commissioned by English Heritage (now Historic England), led to a book, The Archaeology of English Battlefields (2012), principally by Foard, which characterises battlefields as archaeological sites and offers methodologies for their study. With Robert Owen he co-authored Breaching the German the Dams (2008) which re-examined aspects of Operation Chastise. Research for the Gibson biography was aided by Colin Dobinson, who also provided the book's appendices and contributed to several chapters.

== Music ==
As a student, Morris collaborated with the author-to-be Anthony Holden in an opera based on Holden's translation of Aeschylus's Agamemnon, performed at the Oxford Playhouse in 1969. This was followed by The Bellybag, a piece of musical theatre for young people with a libretto by Alan Garner. After turning to archaeology, Morris continued to compose, principally for the Abbey Shakespeare Players who perform annually at St Dogmaels Abbey in Pembrokeshire. He has written for the singer and director Linda Kitchen, the York Shakespeare Project, Hilary Elfick's An Ordinary Storm, and the west Wales Côr Aberteifi.

== Awards ==
In 1992 Morris was awarded the Frend Medal of the Society of Antiquaries of London. He was appointed OBE for services to archaeology in 2003.

== Bibliography ==
=== Books ===
Title	Year	Publisher	ISBN
Cathedrals and Abbeys of England and Wales	1979	W W Norton & Co, Inc.	0393012816
The Church in British Archaeology	1983	Council for British Archaeology	9780906780176
Churches in the Landscape	1989	Phoenix	0460860143
Guy Gibson (with Colin Dobinson)	1994	Penguin	0670828785
Cheshire: The Biography of Leonard Cheshire VC OM	2000	Penguin	9780670867356
Breaching the German Dams (with Robert Owen)	2008	RAF Museum	
Time's Anvil: England, archaeology and the imagination	2012	Weidenfeld & Nicolson	1780222440
The Archaeology of English Battlefields: Conflict in the Pre-industrial Landscape (with Glenn Foard)	2012	Council for British Archaeology	9781902771885
Yorkshire: A Lyrical History of England’s Greatest County	2018	Weidenfeld & Nicolson	9780297609438
Evensong: Reflections on the Church in England	2021	Weidenfeld & Nicolson	9781474614238
Dam Buster. Barnes Wallis: An Engineer’s Life	2023	Weidenfeld & Nicolson	9781474623421
