= Mount Normann =

Mountain in South Georgia

Mount Normann (54°51′S 36°4′W) is a mountain, 1,240 m (4061 ft), standing 1 mile (1.6 km) north of Smaaland Cove at the south end of South Georgia. The feature has appeared on charts since the 1930s. It was surveyed by the SGS in the period 1951–57, and named by the United Kingdom Antarctic Place-Names Committee (UK-APC) for Wilhelm Normann (1870–1939), German chemist, whose work led to the introduction in about 1907 of the hydrogenation process for hardening whale oil.
