= Corbet (disambiguation) =

Corbet is a village and townland in Northern Ireland.

Corbet may also refer to:

- Corbet (surname), a European family name
- Corbet family, an aristocratic family in the British Isles of Anglo-Norman origins
- Corbet baronets, British baronetcies created for members of the Corbet family
- Roper-Corbet, English automobile
- The Corbet School, secondary school in England
- Corbet's forest shrew, small mammal

== Places ==
- Corbet Peak, peak in Antarctica
- Corbet Rock, rock in the Swinge
- Corbet Wood and Grinshill, protected area in Shropshire, England
- Moreton Corbet, village in Shropshire, England
- Piz Corbet, mountain in the Alpes
- Corbet's Couloir, ski run in Wyoming

== People ==
People with the given name Corbet include:

- Corbet Kynaston (1690–1740), English politician
- Corbet Page Stewart (1897–1972), Scottish biochemist and academic author
- Corbet Woodall (1929–1982), English newsreader
- Corbet Woodall (gas engineer) (1841–1916), English gas engineer
- Elizabeth Corbet Yeats (1868–1940), Irish educator and publisher
- Frederick Corbet Davison (1929–2004), American university administrator
- Nigel Corbet Fletcher (1877–1951), English rugby player
- St George Corbet Gore (1849–1913), English army officer and Surveyor General of India
