= Wahlstrom Peak =

Mountain in Antarctica

Location of Sentinel Range in Western Antarctica.

Central and southern Sentinel Range map.

Wahlstrom Peak is a 4,677 metres (15,344 ft) high, sharp peak at the southeast side of the ice-covered Vinson Plateau in the Sentinel Range of the Ellsworth Mountains, Antarctica. It surmounts the head of Roché Glacier to the northwest and Hammer Col to the southeast.

The peak was named by US-ACAN in 2006 after Richard W. Wahlstrom, member of the 1966–67 American Antarctic Mountaineering Expedition that made the first ascent of Mount Vinson, the summit of Antarctica, and other high mountains in the Sentinel Range.

== Location ==
Wahlstrom Peak is located at 78°32′59″S 85°31′29″W, which is 2.11 miles (3.40 km) southeast of Mount Vinson, 1.87 miles (3.01 km) southwest of Marts Peak and 1.44 miles (2.32 km) northeast of Opalchenie Peak. US mapping in 1961, updated in 1988.

== Maps ==
- Vinson Massif. Scale 1:250 000 topographic map. Reston, Virginia: US Geological Survey, 1988.
- D. Gildea and C. Rada. Vinson Massif and the Sentinel Range. Scale 1:50 000 topographic map. Omega Foundation, 2007.
- Antarctic Digital Database (ADD). Scale 1:250000 topographic map of Antarctica. Scientific Committee on Antarctic Research (SCAR). Since 1993, regularly updated.
