= Clinch Peak =

Mountain in Antarctica

Location of Sentinel Range in Western Antarctica.

Central and southern Sentinel Range map.

Clinch Peak is a 4,841 metres (15,883 ft) high, elongated peak, in the central part of the ice-covered Vinson Plateau in the Sentinel Range of the Ellsworth Mountains, Antarctica. It surmounts Roché Glacier to the west.

The peak was named by US-ACAN in 2006 after Nicholas Bayard Clinch, leader of the 1966–67 American Antarctic Mountaineering Expedition that made the first ascent of Mount Vinson, the summit of Antarctica, and other high mountains in the Sentinel Range.

== Location ==
Clinch Peak is located at 78°32′08″S 85°30′45″W, which is 2.6 km (1.6 mi) southeast of Mount Vinson, 1.42 km (0.88 mi) southwest of Schoening Peak, 2.48 km (1.54 mi) west of Marts Peak and 3.9 km (2.4 mi) north-northeast of Opalchenie Peak. US mapping in 1961, updated in 1988.

== See also ==
- Mountains in Antarctica

== Maps ==
- Vinson Massif. Scale 1:250 000 topographic map. Reston, Virginia: US Geological Survey, 1988.
- D. Gildea and C. Rada. Vinson Massif and the Sentinel Range. Scale 1:50 000 topographic map. Omega Foundation, 2007.
- Antarctic Digital Database (ADD). Scale 1:250000 topographic map of Antarctica. Scientific Committee on Antarctic Research (SCAR). Since 1993, regularly updated.
