= Fukushima Peak =

Peak in Antarctica

Location of Sentinel Range in Western Antarctica.

Central and southern Sentinel Range map.

Fukushima Peak is a high, pointed rocky peak, 4,634 metres (15,203 ft) high, near the south edge of the ice-covered Vinson Plateau in the Sentinel Range of the Ellsworth Mountains, Antarctica.

The peak was named by the Advisory Committee on Antarctic Names in 2006 after Eiichi Fukushima, a member of the 1966–67 American Antarctic Mountaineering Expedition that made the first ascent of Mount Vinson, the summit of Antarctica, and other high mountains in the Sentinel Range.

== Location ==
Fukushima Peak is located at 78°33′31″S 85°34′16″W, which is 3.83 kilometres (2.38 mi) south by east of Mount Vinson, 1.54 kilometres (0.96 mi) south by east of Hollister Peak, 1.43 kilometres (0.89 mi) southwest of Wahlstrom Peak, 7.93 kilometres (4.93 mi) northwest of Mount Rutford, 5.07 kilometres (3.15 mi) north by east of Mount Slaughter, 0.99 kilometres (0.62 mi) north by east of Opalchenie Peak and 2.13 kilometres (1.32 mi) southeast of Silverstein Peak. US mapping in 1961, updated in 1988.

== See also ==
- Mountains in Antarctica

== Maps ==
- Vinson Massif. Scale 1:250 000 topographic map. Reston, Virginia: US Geological Survey, 1988.
- D. Gildea and C. Rada. Vinson Massif and the Sentinel Range. Scale 1:50 000 topographic map. Omega Foundation, 2007.
- Antarctic Digital Database (ADD). Scale 1:250000 topographic map of Antarctica. Scientific Committee on Antarctic Research (SCAR). Since 1993, regularly updated.
