= Donnellan Glacier =

Glacier in Antarctica

- Location of Sentinel Range in Western Antarctica

- Location within Antarctica
- Type: tributary
- Location: Ellsworth Land
- Coordinates: 78°36′00″S 85°48′00″W
- Thickness: unknown
- Terminus: Nimitz Glacier
- Status: unknown

Sentinel Range map.

Donnellan Glacier (78°36′S 85°48′W) is a steep valley glacier fed by highland ice adjacent to Opalchenie Peak and Fukushima Peak on Vinson Plateau, the summit plateau of Vinson Massif, in the Sentinel Range of the Ellsworth Mountains, Antarctica. The glacier flows west-southwestward from Opalchenie Peak along the northwest side of Mount Slaughter into Nimitz Glacier.

The glacier was named by the Advisory Committee on Antarctic Names in 2006 after Andrea Donnellan of the Satellite Geodesy and Geodynamics Systems Group at the Jet Propulsion Laboratory, California Institute of Technology, who was involved from the mid-1990s in research projects involving the use of GPS in studies of earth crustal deformation in Southern California and also in Antarctica.

== See also ==
- List of glaciers in the Antarctic
- Glaciology

== Maps ==
- Vinson Massif. Scale 1:250 000 topographic map. Reston, Virginia: US Geological Survey, 1988.
- Antarctic Digital Database (ADD). Scale 1:250000 topographic map of Antarctica. Scientific Committee on Antarctic Research (SCAR). Since 1993, regularly updated.
