= Barry Corbet =

Mountaineer, author, explorer (1936–2004)

Barry Corbet (August 1, 1936 – December 18, 2004) was a Canadian-American mountaineer, film-maker and author. He was a member of the 1963 American Mount Everest West Ridge Expedition, which was the first U.S. Team to climb Mount Everest. Corbet produced or co-produced more than 100 films, and he was also the editor of New Mobility, a magazine on disability culture and lifestyle. He wrote extensively on disability related issues. His book, Options: Spinal Cord Injury and the Future, was published in 1980.

Corbet was born on August 1, 1936, in Vancouver, British Columbia. He dropped out of Dartmouth College and moved to Wyoming to pursue his love of skiing and mountaineering.

Corbet was recruited by Barry Bishop to join a team on a secretive mission to the Nanda Devi area. The joint CIA / Indian Intelligence Bureau mission involved placing a nuclear powered listening device on the summit of Nanda Devi in 1965. Corbet wasn't involved in the 1965 mission, which was unsuccessful, his role was on a subsequent mission when an equivalent device was placed on the nearby Nanda Kot in 1967.

Corbet died on December 18, 2004, which was far later than medics had predicted after a helicopter crash in 1968 which left paralyzed from the waist down.

== Places and events named after him ==
- Corbet Peak is a 4,822-metre-high (15,820-foot) peak, at the north edge of the ice-covered Vinson Plateau in the Sentinel Range of the Ellsworth Mountains, Antarctica. The peak was named by US-ACAN in 2006 after Corbet, who was a member of the 1966–67 American Antarctic Mountaineering Expedition that made the first ascent of Mount Vinson.
- Corbet's Couloir is an expert ski run located at the Jackson Hole Mountain Resort in Teton Village, Wyoming. When he was a Jackson Hole ski instructor and mountain guide, Corbet spotted the narrow crease of snow shaped like an inverted funnel.
- The 'Barry Corbet Film Festival', which showcases feature films on skiing, surfing, and climbing.

== Filmography ==
- Full Circle tells the intertwining stories of Corbet and Trevor Kennison (an adaptive paraplegic skier who found fame in 2019 after being the first sit skier to ski Corbet's Couloir).
