= Schoening Peak =

Mountain in Antarctica

Location of Sentinel Range in Western Antarctica.

Central and southern Sentinel Range map.

Schoening Peak is a 4,743 metres (15,561 ft) high, steep and rocky peak, at the northeast edge of the ice-covered Vinson Plateau in the Sentinel Range of the Ellsworth Mountains, Antarctica. It surmounts Hinkley Glacier to the north and Dater Glacier to the northeast.

The peak was named by US-ACAN in 2006 after Peter K. Schoening (1927-2004), member of the 1966–67 American Antarctic Mountaineering Expedition that made the first ascent of Mount Vinson, the summit of Antarctica, and other high mountains in the Sentinel Range.

== Location ==
Schoening Peak is located at 78°31′36″S 85°27′57″W, which is 2.09 miles (3.36 km) east of Mount Vinson, 1.2 miles (1.9 km) northwest of Marts Peak, 3.24 miles (5.21 km) northeast of Opalchenie Peak and 2.91 miles (4.68 km) east-northeast of Silverstein Peak. US mapping in 1961, updated in 1988.

== Maps ==
- Vinson Massif. Scale 1:250 000 topographic map. Reston, Virginia: US Geological Survey, 1988.
- D. Gildea and C. Rada. Vinson Massif and the Sentinel Range. Scale 1:50 000 topographic map. Omega Foundation, 2007.
- Antarctic Digital Database (ADD). Scale 1:250000 topographic map of Antarctica. Scientific Committee on Antarctic Research (SCAR). Since 1993, regularly updated.
