= 13 Minutes =

13 Minutes may refer to:

- 13 Minutes (2015 film), German film
- 13 Minutes, a 2016 novel by Sarah Pinborough
- 13 Minutes (2021 film), American film

== See also ==
- Thirteen Minutes Magazine, Asian-American lifestyle magazine
- XIII Minutes, American metal band
- Thirteen minutes to midnight, on the Doomsday Clock
