= Mount Slaughter =

Mountain in Ellsworth Land, Antarctica

Coordinates: 78°37′S 85°38′W

Location of Sentinel Range in Western Antarctica.

Sentinel Range map.

Mount Slaughter is an ice-free peak, rising to 3,444 metres (11,299 ft) on a spur trending southwest from Opalchenie Peak on Vinson Plateau, Sentinel Range, in the Ellsworth Mountains, Antarctica. It is surmounting the head of Donnellan Glacier to the northwest and Gildea Glacier to the south. It was mapped by the United States Geological Survey (USGS) from surveys and U.S. Navy aerial photographs from 1957 to 1960. It was named by the Advisory Committee on Antarctic Names (US-ACAN) in 1982, after John B. Slaughter, the director of the National Science Foundation from 1980 to 1982.

== Maps ==
- Vinson Massif. Scale 1:250 000 topographic map. Reston, Virginia: US Geological Survey, 1988.
- D. Gildea and C. Rada. Vinson Massif and the Sentinel Range. Scale 1:50 000 topographic map. Omega Foundation, 2007.
- Antarctic Digital Database (ADD). Scale 1:250000 topographic map of Antarctica. Scientific Committee on Antarctic Research (SCAR). Since 1993, regularly updated.
