= Goodge =

Goodge may refer to:

== People ==
- Barnaby Goodge (1540–1594), English poet and translator
- Robert Goodge, member of Australian mixing outfit Filthy Lucre
- W. T. Goodge (1862–1909), English-Australian writer and journalist

== Other ==
- Goodge Col, a geographic feature in Antarctica

== See also ==
- Goodge Street shelter, see London deep-level shelters
- Goodge Street tube station, London
- Goodge Street (LCR) tube station, London
