= Hollister Peak (Antarctica) =

Mountain in Antarctica

Location of Sentinel Range in Western Antarctica.

Central and southern Sentinel Range map.

Hollister Peak is a 4,729-metre-high (15,515 ft) sharp peak in the central part of the ice-covered Vinson Plateau in the Sentinel Range of the Ellsworth Mountains, Antarctica. It surmounts the head of Roché Glacier to the north.

The peak was named by US-ACAN in 2006 after the geologist and oceanographer Charles Davis Hollister (1936–1999), who was a member of the 1966–1967 American Antarctic Mountaineering Expedition that made the first ascent of Mount Vinson (the highest point of Antarctica) and other high mountains in the Sentinel Range.

== Location ==
Hollister Peak is located at 78°32′43″S 85°35′19″W, which is 2.30 km (1.43 mi) south by east of Mount Vinson, 4.22 km (2.62 mi) west by south of Marts Peak, 1.54 km (0.96 mi) north by west of Fukushima Peak and 2.46 km (1.53 mi) north of Opalchenie Peak. US mapping in 1961, updated in 1988.

== See also ==
- Mountains in Antarctica

== Maps ==
- Vinson Massif. Scale 1:250 000 topographic map. Reston, Virginia: US Geological Survey, 1988.
- D. Gildea and C. Rada. Vinson Massif and the Sentinel Range. Scale 1:50 000 topographic map. Omega Foundation, 2007.
- Antarctic Digital Database (ADD). Scale 1:250000 topographic map of Antarctica. Scientific Committee on Antarctic Research (SCAR). Since 1993, regularly updated.
