= Thirteen Minutes Magazine =

US magazine

- Editor: Quinn Bui
- Categories: Entertainment
- Frequency: Bi-monthly
- Publisher: IMatrix Inc.
- Paid circulation: 15,000
- Unpaid circulation: 51,000
- Founded: 2005
- Country: United States
- Based in: Orange County, California
- Language: English
- Website: thirteenminutes.com

Thirteen Minutes Magazine (sometimes abbreviated 13MinMag) is a magazine published by (IMatrix Inc.) in the United States which covers high fashion, Asian women's beauty, movies/TV, food, and popular culture. The magazine was started in 2005. It is a magazine about bicultural Asians and those interested in Asian culture. Its headquarters is in Orange County, California.

The magazine follows a typical format by featuring an editor's monthly thoughts and table of contents in the first few pages, while also featuring advertisements. While some ads are unrelated to the fashion industry, the majority of ads are typically related to high fashion, makeup, film and women's beauty related materials.

== Featured celebrities ==
To date, the magazine has featured the following celebrities on the covers and inside its pages:

- Brenda Song of the Disney Channel's The Suite Life of Zack and Cody
- The Scorpion King's Kelly Hu
- Battlestar Galactica's Grace Park
- DJ Shy of the Los Angeles-based 102.7 KIIS FM
- Heroes' Masi Oka
- HBO's Entourage's Rex Lee
- Maggie Q of Die Hard 4 and Mission Impossible 3
- Yunjin Kim of Lost
- Nancy Yoon
- Chloe Dao of Project Runway
- Michelle Krusiec

== Major articles ==
There are typically four to six major articles within the middle pages of the magazine. These articles are most commonly interviews, but there are also narrative articles as well as lists. Feature articles tend to focus mostly on celebrities, and how-to's.

== Event attendance ==
Thirteen Minutes is dedicated to supporting and serving the Asian and Pacific Islanders community. Thirteen Minutes continually attends events including MAGIC trade show, the Sundance Film Festival, the Los Angeles Lunar New Year Parade, Miss Asia, LA Fashion Week (and also Japan & Hong Kong) to mention just a few.

== Specialty issues ==
Every year, 13 Minutes Magazine publishes a number of specialty issues. These issues are often published as issues larger than the normal standard.

Common specialty issues include:

- Swimsuit Issue – Every Summer, 13 Minutes covers the industry's hottest and sexiest bathing apparel in their scorching pages. In the vein of Sports Illustrated's top selling swimsuit issue, 13 Minutes ensures that every page will leave its reader breathless. Hot and off the market, these swimsuits (not sold in stores and found nowhere else) are featured in the daring, sexy, and glossy manner as only 13 Minutes can provide.

== Onboard photographers ==
- Don Le (2006)
- Tony Nguyen Campobello (2006)
- Paige Apadoca (2006)
- Andrew Matusik (2006)
- Wilfredo Pascu (2006)
- Rodney Ray (2006)
- Christopher Voelker (2006)
