= Jay Kemmerer =

American businessman and philanthropist

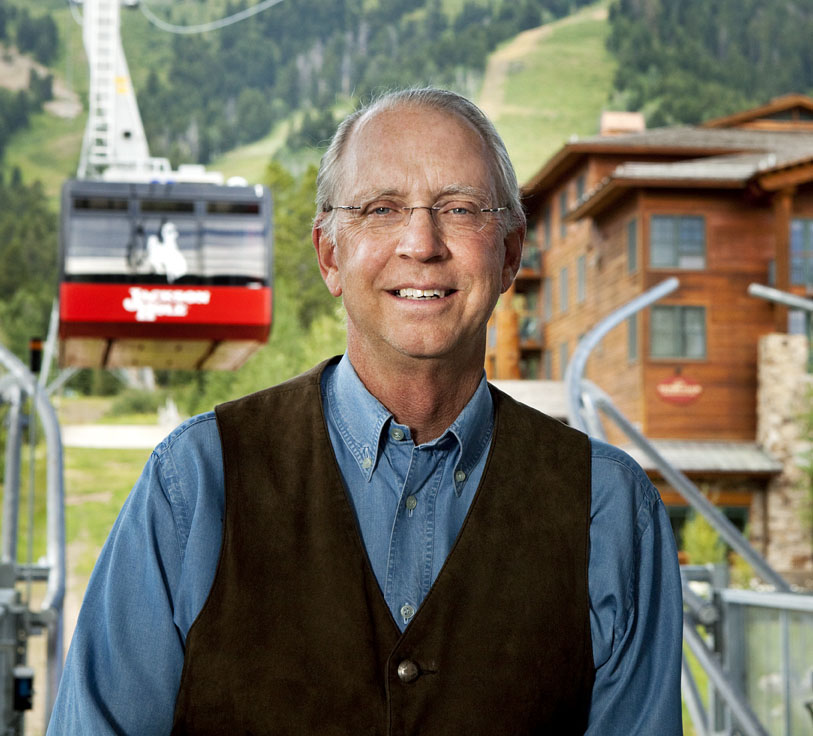
- Kemmerer in 2009
- Born: July 15, 1947 (age 79)
- Education: University of Denver
- Title: Chairman of Kemmerer Resources Corp.
- Board member of: Jackson Hole Mountain Resort; The Kemmerer Family Foundation; U.S. Ski and Snowboard Team Foundation (emeritus); Friends of Hearts for Honduras Foundation (emeritus); Harding Land Trust (emeritus)

John L. "Jay" Kemmerer III (born July 15, 1947), known as Jay Kemmerer, is an American businessman, entrepreneur, and philanthropist. He acquired the Jackson Hole Mountain Resort in Teton Village, Wyoming for his family in 1992, and served as Chairman until February 2024. In 1997, he acquired the CM Ranch in Dubois, Wyoming. His family connections to the State of Wyoming stem from the mining interests of his great-grandfather Mahlon S. Kemmerer in the 1890s, for whom the city of Kemmerer, Wyoming was named.

== Early life and education ==
The son of John L. Kemmerer, Jr. and Mary Elizabeth Halbach, Kemmerer was raised in Short Hills, New Jersey. His father was Chairman of the Kemmerer Coal Company, which was established by Mahlon S. Kemmerer and Patrick J. Quealy in 1897. Diamondville, Wyoming was the site of their first mining operation, and was the “company town,” while the City of Kemmerer was founded as the “independent town” located south of the mines. Kemmerer is also notable as the location of the first J. C. Penney store, and the home of the Fossil Butte National Monument. At its height, the Kemmerer Coal Company had the largest open pit coal mine in the United States, and served three local power generating plants of Utah Power & Light.

Kemmerer graduated from Salisbury School in Salisbury, Connecticut in 1966, where he was awarded varsity letters in football, ice hockey, and baseball. He was Athlete of the Year in his senior year. He then attended Clarkson University in Potsdam, New York, and earned a Bachelor of Science of Business Administration - Finance from the University of Denver in 1970.

== Career ==
Kemmerer worked for Chemical Bank in New York from 1974 – 1977 before joining his father at The Kemmerer Corporation, and leading the sale of the Kemmerer Coal Company to Gulf Oil in 1981. Following this divestiture, he became President of the family's asset management company, Kemmerer Resources Corp., located in Chatham, New Jersey.

He served on the board of directors of the First Wyoming Bank from 1983 – 1989, until its sale to Key Bank. At that time the Kemmerer family was its largest stockholder. Kemmerer chaired the Investment Committee.

In 1986, Kemmerer purchased the Seven-Up Bottling Company, a major soft drink bottler and distributor in the Chicago area, which then became known as Kemmerer Bottling Group, Inc., and was the third-largest bottler of 7-Up in the country. He was later elected to the board of the National Soft Drink Association from 1988 – 1992.

Jay Kemmerer purchased the Jackson Hole Mountain Resort for his family in 1992 from Paul McCollister. It remains one of the last premier family-owned ski resorts in America. Improvements to the resort under Kemmerer family ownership totaled over $300,000,000, including the addition of the Bridger Gondola in 1997, the Rendezvous Lodge complex at 9,100 ft. in 2007, a new Aerial Tram in 2008, the Teton high speed quad lift in 2015, and the Sweetwater Gondola in 2016.

Kemmerer sold the Jackson Hole Mountain Resort on February 1, 2024, to close friends, local residents and Board members Eric Macy and Mike Corbat. Kemmerer continues to serve on the Board of Directors and Executive Committee, and function in a Senior Advisory role. The Kemmerer Family remains an equity owner in JHMR.

In 1997, Kemmerer purchased the CM Ranch in Dubois, Wyoming with his sisters, which the Kemmerer family visited in the 1950s. Founded in 1927, the CM is one of the oldest continually-operating guest ranches in the U.S. Total improvements to plumbing, electrical, flooring and roofs have been made to most structures, while maintaining its status on the National Register of Historic Places.

In August 2021, Kemmerer co-hosted a House Freedom Fund event, which headlined former Trump White House Chief of Staff Mark Meadows, U.S. Rep. Jim Jordan (R-Ohio) and U.S. Rep. Marjorie Taylor Greene (R-Georgia). Patagonia, Inc., the sportswear company, took exception to Kemmerer's personal donation and withdrew its products from the Jackson Hole Mountain Resort.

Kemmerer was inducted into the Wyoming Business Hall of Fame in November 2025 at the Governor’s Business Forum.

In September 2026, he was honored by the non-profit JH Air for his vision and leadership of air service to Jackson Hole, in guaranteeing United, Delta and American Airlines contracts for more than 20 years.

Kemmerer and his family also owned the master-planned golf community of Comanche Trace in Kerrville, Texas from 1998 – April 2022.

== Philanthropy ==
Kemmerer and his father established the Kemmerer Family Foundation in 2000. As of 2024, the foundation has awarded over $60,000,000 in grants, and has assets of over $100,000,000. Its mission is to give back to communities and organizations with which family members are involved.

The Kemmerer family maintains an undergraduate scholarship endowment at the University of Wyoming, which awards a full scholarship each year to a top graduating student from Kemmerer High School and Dubois High School. Kemmerer also established a Graduate Fellowship at the University of Wyoming's Haub School of Environment and Natural Resources in 2014, and underwrote the establishment of a Bachelor’s degree program in Outdoor Recreation and Tourism Management in 2020 to promote Wyoming’s second-largest industry. On December 3, 2024, the Haub School announced the establishment of the Jay Kemmerer WORTH Institute (Wyoming Outdoor Recreation, Tourism and Hospitality) in recognition of Kemmerer’s leadership in the Wyoming Ski and Guest Ranch industries. The Institute will advance innovation, education and economic growth in tourism. Kemmerer received a Doctor of Humane Letters Honorary Degree from the University of Wyoming on May 16, 2026.

Kemmerer lived in Harding Township, New Jersey for over 30 years, where he established a land preservation organization, the Harding Land Trust, in 1990 with guidance from Sally Dudley and Clint Curtis. He ran the organization from his office for many years, and remains a Trustee Emeritus. He was also the primary donor of the Kemmerer Library at Harding Township, built in 2010.

Kemmerer has also been the primary benefactor of Friends of Hearts for Honduras Foundation. This organization was established by members of the Liberty Corner Presbyterian Church to assist the church school that reaches over 200 of the poorest children in La Entrada, Honduras.

He in an Emeritus Trustee of the U.S. Ski and Snowboard Team Foundation, on whose board he has served since 1997.

== Personal life ==
Kemmerer has three daughters, a step-daughter, and six grandchildren. He is an avid fly fisherman, golfer, skier, cyclist, and outdoor enthusiast. He and his wife, Karen Varnas, were married in 2009 in the Jackson Hole Tram at the top of Rendezvous Mountain. In addition to their primary residence in Jackson, the Kemmerers maintain homes in Madison, New Jersey, and Vero Beach, Florida.
