= New Mobility =

Disability magazine

New Mobility (founded as Spinal Network Extra)
- Editor: Ian Ruder (since 2018)
- Former editors: Sam Maddox (1989–1991); Barry Corbet (1991–2018} )
- Categories: Disability
- Frequency: Monthly (started as a quarterly, has also been bi-monthly)
- Founder: Sam Maddox
- Founded: Boulder, Colorado (as Spinal Network Extra)
- First issue: 1989 (37 years ago)
- Company: United Spinal Association (since 2010)
- Country: United States
- Language: English
- Website: newmobility.com
- ISSN: 1065-2124
- OCLC: 26529841

New Mobility, launched in 1989, is a United States–based magazine for active wheelchair users.

This monthly publication covers health, disability rights, adaptive technology and lifestyle topics such as recreation, travel, the arts, relationships, sexuality, parenting, employment and home modification. It also profiles successful wheelchair users, including John Hockenberry, Christopher Voelker, Brooke Ellison, Chantal Petitclerc and the late Christopher Reeve.

New Mobility, received an Utne Independent Press Award for Lifestyle Coverage in 2006.

== History ==
New Mobility was founded in 1989 in Boulder, Colorado, by Sam Maddox to provide information about life after spinal cord injury, multiple sclerosis, post-polio sequelae and other disabling conditions. Originally titled Spinal Network Extra, the then-quarterly magazine was a spin-off of the 1987 book Spinal Network: The Total Resource for the Wheelchair Community.

Maddox edited New Mobility until 1991, when Barry Corbet, a paraplegic from a spinal-cord injury, took the helm. The title was changed to New Mobility for the Summer 1992 issue. In 1993, the magazine temporarily ceased publication.

Miramar Publishing (later Miramar Communications) bought the title and relaunched it in 1994. It became bimonthly in 1995 and monthly in 1996. In 1998, No Limits Communications acquired the magazine. In 2000, Corbet retired, and Gilmer, also paraplegic, took over as editor. In 2010, United Spinal Association bought New Mobility and continues to publish it monthly. In 2018, Gilmer retired and Ian Ruder took over as editor.

== The niche ==
Early disability titles tended to reflect what is known as the medical model of disability, which emphasized the need for cures and referred to people with disabilities as "patients". New Mobility defined its social model of disability point of view with a lifestyle-oriented approach, inclusion mentality and people-first language. It was also one of the first periodicals to address seriously sexuality and disability, and its provocative role in this area has been recognized by the Los Angeles Times, and subsequently the Associated Press. The magazine sums up its place in the field of disability journalism with the tagline "Life Beyond Wheels".
