= Nicholas Clinch =

American mountaineer (1930-2016)

Nicholas Bayard Clinch III
- Born: November 9, 1930; Evanston, Illinois
- Died: June 15, 2016 (aged 85); Palo Alto, California
- Occupations: Mountaineer, lawyer, author
- Known for: FA Gasherbrum I 1958; FA Mount Vinson 1960
- Works: A Walk in the Sky: Climbing Hidden Peak; Through a Land of Extremes: The Littledales of Central Asia.

Nicholas Bayard Clinch III (9 November 1930, Evanston, Illinois – 15 June 2016, California) was an American mountain climber, lawyer, author and environmentalist. Clinch Peak, in Antarctica, was named for him in 2006.

== Education and personal life ==
The son of Virginia Lee Clinch and Nicholas Bayard Clinch Jr., a colonel in the U.S. Air Force, Nicholas "Nick" Clinch grew up in Dallas, Texas, and later attended the New Mexico Military Institute in Roswell. He graduated from Stanford University with a B.A. in political science in 1951, then obtained a degree from Stanford Law School. He followed his father into the Air Force, but due to his asthma and poor eyesight, was unable to qualify as a pilot. Instead, he worked as legal consul at the American bases in Iceland and Long Beach. He has one younger sister, also named Virginia Lee. He married Elizabeth ("Betsy") Wallace Campbell in 1964. They had two daughters.

== Mountain climbing ==
While attending Stanford University, Clinch became a member of the Stanford Alpine Club and climbed extensively throughout the Sierra Nevada and Yosemite National Park.

He is the only American ever to have led a first ascent of a peak in excess of 8,000 metres (26,000 ft), which was achieved when his team conquered the world's 11th highest mountain, Hidden Peak (Gasherbrum I) in north-east Pakistan, in 1958. He was a member of the American-Pakistani team which made the first ascent of Masherbrum, the world's 22nd tallest peak, in 1960. He led the 10-man 1966–67 American Antarctic Mountaineering Expedition that made the first ascent of Mount Vinson, the summit of Antarctica, and other high mountains in the Sentinel Range.

He was president of the American Alpine Club from 1968 to 1970. He also made the first ascent of Tibet's Ulugh Muztagh, in 1985. In addition to Antarctica, Pakistan and Tibet, he made numerous ascents and expeditions in the United States, British Columbia, Peru and China.

== Legal career ==
Clinch was trustee and then executive director of the Sierra Club Foundation from 1970 to 1981 and was an early member of the board of nature-focused consumers' co-operative Recreational Equipment, Inc. In the 1970s, he represented the Lincoln Savings and Loan Association of Irvine, California. He was a director of the Environmental Law Institute from 1980 to 1986.

== Awards and recognition ==
In 1967, National Geographic awarded Clinch their La Gorce Medal for his Antarctic ascent. Clinch was made a Fellow of the Explorers Club in 1969 and was elected to Honorary Membership in The Alpine Club, London. For his contributions to mountaineering, the Sierra Club awarded Clinch its Francis P. Farquhar Mountaineering Award. In 2013, he was inducted into the Hall of Mountaineering Excellence by the American Mountaineering Museum. In February 2016, Clinch received the American Alpine Club's Gold Medal, only the fifth to be awarded in 114 years.

Clinch Peak, located at 1.6 miles (2.6 km) southeast of Antarctica's tallest peak, Mount Vinson, was named for Clinch in 2006.

== Bibliography ==
- Clinch, Nicholas (1982). A Walk in the Sky: Climbing Hidden Peak. Mountaineers. ISBN 9780898860429.
- Clinch, Nicholas; Clinch, Elizabeth (2011). Through a Land of Extremes: The Littledales of Central Asia. The Mountaineers Books. ISBN 9781594855153.
