= Marts Peak =

Mountain in Ellsworth Land, Antarctica

Location of Sentinel Range in Western Antarctica.

Central and southern Sentinel Range map.

Marts Peak is a 4,551 metres (14,931 ft) high, small and sharp peak at the east edge of the ice-covered Vinson Plateau in the Sentinel Range of the Ellsworth Mountains, Antarctica. It surmounts Dater Glacier to the northeast and Hammer Col to the south.

The peak was named by US-ACAN in 2006 after Brian Marts, a member of the 1966–67 American Antarctic Mountaineering Expedition that made the first ascent of Mount Vinson, the summit of Antarctica, and other high mountains in the Sentinel Range.

== Location ==
Marts Peak is located at 78°32′18″S 85°24′07″W, which is 3.1 miles (5.0 km) east-southeast of Mount Vinson, 3.18 miles (5.12 km) northeast of Opalchenie Peak and 3.47 miles (5.58 km) east by north of Silverstein Peak, according to US maps made in 1961 and updated in 1988.

== See also ==
- Mountains in Antarctica

== Maps ==
- Vinson Massif. Scale 1:250 000 topographic map. Reston, Virginia: US Geological Survey, 1988.
- D. Gildea and C. Rada. Vinson Massif and the Sentinel Range. Scale 1:50 000 topographic map. Omega Foundation, 2007.
- Antarctic Digital Database (ADD). Scale 1:250000 topographic map of Antarctica. Scientific Committee on Antarctic Research (SCAR). Since 1993, regularly updated.
