= Corbet Peak =

Mountain in Antarctica

Location of Sentinel Range in Western Antarctica.

Central and southern Sentinel Range map.

Corbet Peak is a 4,822-metre-high (15,820 ft) peak, at the north edge of the ice-covered Vinson Plateau in the Sentinel Range of the Ellsworth Mountains, Antarctica. It surmounts Hinkley Glacier to the northeast and the head of Roché Glacier to the southwest.

The peak was named by US-ACAN in 2006 after Barry Corbet (1936-2004), member of the 1966–67 American Antarctic Mountaineering Expedition that made the first ascent of Mount Vinson, the summit of Antarctica, and other high mountains in the Sentinel Range.

== Location ==
Corbet Peak is located at 78°31′31″S 85°32′50″W, which is 0.97 miles (1.56 km) east of Mount Vinson. US mapping in 1961, updated in 1988.

== Maps ==
- Vinson Massif. Scale 1:250 000 topographic map. Reston, Virginia: US Geological Survey, 1988.
- D. Gildea and C. Rada. Vinson Massif and the Sentinel Range. Scale 1:50 000 topographic map. Omega Foundation, 2007.
- Antarctic Digital Database (ADD). Scale 1:250000 topographic map of Antarctica. Scientific Committee on Antarctic Research (SCAR). Since 1993, regularly updated.
