= Roché Glacier =

Glacier in Antarctica

- Location of Sentinel Range in Western Antarctica

- Location within Antarctica
- Type: tributary
- Location: Ellsworth Land
- Coordinates: 78°32′10″S 85°38′30″W
- Length: 3 nautical miles (5.6 km; 3.5 mi)
- Width: 1 nautical mile (1.9 km; 1.2 mi)
- Thickness: unknown
- Terminus: Branscomb Glacier
- Status: unknown

Vinson Massif map.

Roché Glacier (Bulgarian: ледник Роше, romanized: lednik Roshe, IPA: [ˈlɛdnik roˈʃɛ]) is the 5.8 km long and 2 km wide glacier draining the central part of Vinson Plateau in Sentinel Range, Ellsworth Mountains in Antarctica. Its head is bounded by Mount Vinson to the north, Corbet Peak and Clinch Peak to the east, Wahlstrom Peak to the southeast, and Hollister Peak to the south, with the glacier flowing westwards and descending steeply north of Silverstein Peak to join Branscomb Glacier.

The glacier is named after the British pioneer of Antarctica Anthony de la Roché who discovered the first land in the Antarctic region (Roché Island, present South Georgia) in 1675.

== Location ==
Roché Glacier is centred at 78°32′10″S 85°38′30″W. US mapping in 1961, 1988 and 2007.

== See also ==
- List of glaciers in the Antarctic
- Glaciology

== Maps ==
- Vinson Massif. Scale 1:250 000 topographic map. Reston, Virginia: US Geological Survey, 1988.
- D. Gildea and C. Rada. Vinson Massif and the Sentinel Range. Scale 1:50 000 topographic map. Omega Foundation, 2007.
- Antarctic Digital Database (ADD). Scale 1:250000 topographic map of Antarctica. Scientific Committee on Antarctic Research (SCAR). Since 1993, regularly updated.
