= Corbet's Couloir =

Ski run in Jackson Hole, Wyoming

Coordinates: 43.596088°N 110.867774°W

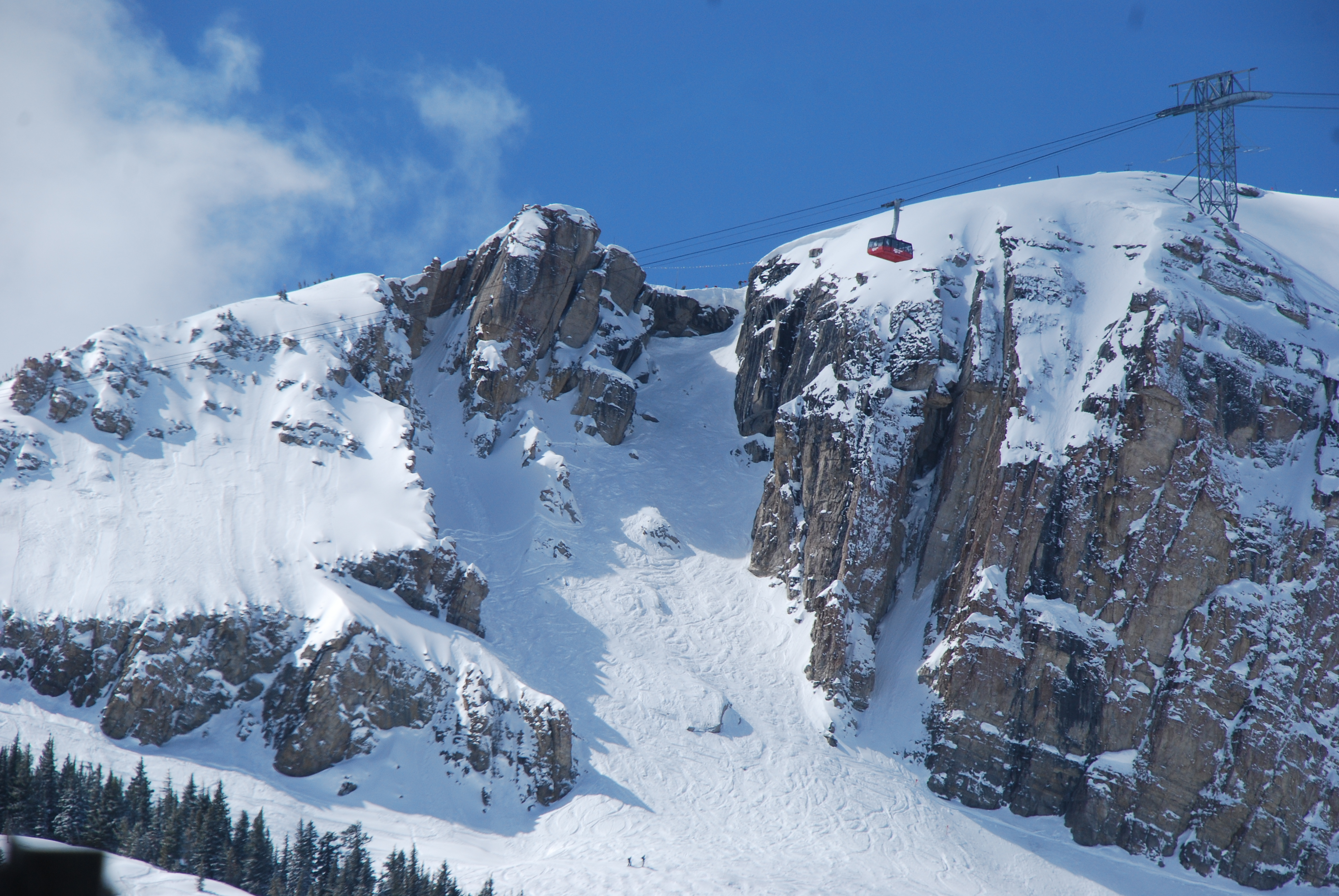
Corbet's Couloir

Corbet's Couloir is an expert ski run located at the Jackson Hole Mountain Resort in Teton Village, Wyoming. It is named after Jackson Hole ski instructor and mountain guide Barry Corbet who famously spotted the narrow crease of snow shaped like an upside down funnel and remarked, "Someday someone will ski that."

It was first skied by local ski patroller Lonnie Ball in 1967. It holds an international reputation among expert skiers, and has been described as "America's scariest ski slope".

== Features ==
Corbet's Couloir is to the skier's left exiting from the tram. It is about ten feet wide at the entrance with rock faces on three sides, but opens up quickly. Entrance into the couloir requires dropping off a cornice with a free fall ranging from 10 to 20 feet (6.1 m) depending upon snow conditions and exactly where the skier chooses to drop in, landing in the fairly narrow couloir with rock walls on either side.

Skiers may opt to ski down the first part of the south face, dropping the rest of the way (actually the standard route to ski the couloir), in which case the drop is less, but they must then make a quick right to steer away from the north rock face. The rest of Corbet's is usually a powder stash because snow collects in the couloir where it is protected from both wind and sun, and relatively few people ski through. The rest of Corbet's Couloir is essentially an average expert run after the drop.

Around the left of the large rock outcropping (looking at the mountain) is the lesser known S&S Couloir. The run’s opening 20+ foot drop dwarfs Corbet’s and due to safety concerns requires permission from the Ski Patrol to ski during the infrequent occasions in which it is open. The trail was named for Charlie Sands and John Simms, the first two ski patrollers to make the run successfully.

Toward the end of Corbet's Couloir, to the right (also looking at the mountain) is a small rock alcove called Coomb's Cave. Due to the depth of the snow in the area and the slope, it is generally difficult to get to Coomb's Cave without dropping down Corbet's.
