= Corbet Page Stewart =

Scottish biochemist and academic (1897–1972)

Corbet Page Stewart FSA Scot FRSE (1897–1972) was a Scottish biochemist and academic author.

== Life ==
He was born in Willington, County Durham on 14 April 1897, the son of Corbet Page Stewart, a headmaster, and Ada Mary Fairclough.

He studied chemistry at Armstrong College in Newcastle, which was then a part of the Newcastle University. He studied for a doctorate in medical chemistry at the University of Edinburgh, and began lecturing there in biochemistry. He also worked to expand the biochemical service at Edinburgh's Royal Infirmary.

In 1931 he was elected a Fellow of the Royal Society of Edinburgh. His proposers were George Barger, James Lorrain Smith, David Murray Lyon and Sir David Wilkie. He resigned in 1938.

During the second world war, Stewart was a member of the Medical Council's Blood Transfusion Committee and as an advisor to the Polish Red Cross received the honour of the Polonia Restituta.

In 1942, Stewart published a lecture "Nutritional Factors in Dark Adaptation", on nutrition and night vision, acknowledging help in his experiments given by his students and assistants Lady Augusta Buchan (MBE), Miss Bramwell, Miss Morrison, and Miss Wood.

He died in 1972.

== Family ==
In 1919 he married Ethel May Kemp (b.1898).

== Publications ==
- The Revival of the Religious Mendicant Orders
- Clinical Chemistry in Practical Medicine (1962)
- Advances in Clinical Chemistry (1970)
