= Goodge Col =

Location of Sentinel Range in Western Antarctica.

Sentinel Range map.

Goodge Col (78°28′S 85°38′W) is a broad ice-covered col at 3,600 metres (11,800 ft) elevation between the south side of Mount Shinn and the Vinson Massif in the Sentinel Range of the Ellsworth Mountains in Antarctica. The col is relatively level, 1.5 miles (2.4 km) wide, and is easily identified from positions east and west of the range. It drains northeastwards into Crosswell Glacier, eastwards into Hinkley Glacier and, jointly with the ice filled Jacobsen Valley, westwards into Branscomb Glacier.

Goodge Col was named by the Advisory Committee on Antarctic Names (2006) after John W. Goodge, Assistant Professor in the Department of Geological Sciences, University of Minnesota, Duluth, and a United States Antarctic Program investigator of the evolution of the East Antarctic shield, mid 1980s to 2006.

== Maps ==
- Vinson Massif. Scale 1:250 000 topographic map. Reston, Virginia: US Geological Survey, 1988.
- D. Gildea and C. Rada. Vinson Massif and the Sentinel Range. Scale 1:50 000 topographic map. Omega Foundation, 2007.
- Antarctic Digital Database (ADD). Scale 1:250000 topographic map of Antarctica. Scientific Committee on Antarctic Research (SCAR). Since 1993, regularly updated.
