= Hinkley Glacier =

Glacier in Antarctica

- Location of Sentinel Range in Western Antarctica

- Location within Antarctica
- Type: tributary
- Location: Ellsworth Land
- Coordinates: 78°27′00″S 85°20′00″W
- Thickness: unknown
- Terminus: Dater Glacier
- Status: unknown

Central and southern Sentinel Range map.

Hinkley Glacier (78°27′S 85°20′W) is a glacier flowing northeastward from Corbet Peak and Schoening Peak, Vinson Massif on the east slope of Sentinel Range in the Ellsworth Mountains, Antarctica, and continuing between Mount Segers and Zinsmeister Ridge to enter Dater Glacier southeast of Nebeska Peak and northwest of Sipey Bluff. It was named by US-ACAN (2006) after Todd K. Hinkley, Technical Director, National Ice Core Laboratory, U.S. Geological Survey, Denver, CO, 2001-06.

== See also ==
- List of glaciers in the Antarctic
- Glaciology

== Maps ==
- Vinson Massif. Scale 1:250 000 topographic map. Reston, Virginia: US Geological Survey, 1988.
- Antarctic Digital Database (ADD). Scale 1:250000 topographic map of Antarctica. Scientific Committee on Antarctic Research (SCAR). Since 1993, regularly updated.
