= Jackson Hole Mountain Resort =

Ski resort in Wyoming, United States

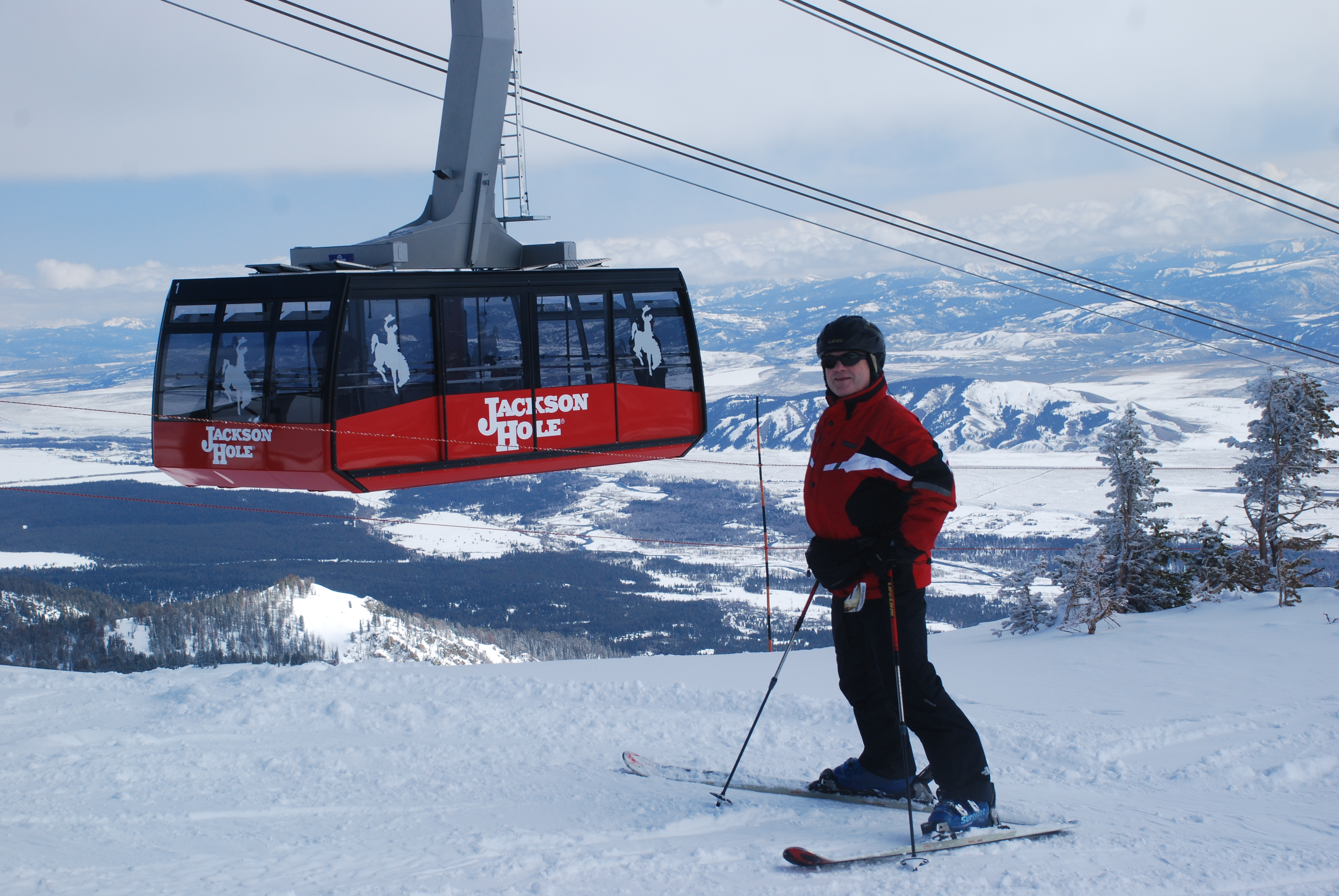
- An aerial tram at summit in March 2010

- Location in the United States Location in Wyoming
- Location: Teton Village, Wyoming, U.S.
- Nearest city: Jackson - 12 miles (20 km)
- Coordinates: 43.59°N 110.89°W
- Status: Operating
- Vertical: continuous 4,139 ft (1,262 m)
- Top elevation: 10,450 ft (3,185 m)
- Base elevation: 6,311 ft (1,924 m)
- Skiable area: 2,500 acres (10 km^{2}) inbounds 3,000 acres (12 km^{2}) backcountry
- Trails: 116; 10% easiest 40% more difficult 50% most difficult
- Longest run: 4.5 miles (7.2 km)
- Lift system: 1 tram - (100); 2 gondolas - (8); 10 chairlifts: 5 high-speed quads; 4 fixed-grip quads; 1 fixed-grip doubles 2 magic carpet 1 rope tow
- Lift capacity: 16,733 / hr
- Terrain parks: Yes, 2 (1 half pipe)
- Snowfall: 459 inches (1,170 cm)
- Snowmaking: Yes, 160 acres (0.65 km^{2})
- Night skiing: No
- Website: jacksonhole.com

Jackson Hole Mountain Resort (JHMR) is a ski resort in the western United States in Teton Village, Wyoming. It is in the Teton Range of the Rocky Mountains, twelve miles (20 km) northwest of Jackson and due south of Grand Teton National Park.

It is named after the historically significant Jackson Hole valley and is known for its steep terrain and large continuous vertical drop of 4,139 ft (1,262 m). JHMR appears frequently in the media as one of North America's most expensive ski resorts.

== Ski area information ==
The ski area partially covers Rendezvous and Apres Vous Mountains and is known for its challenging terrain, including the infamous Corbet's Couloir. Half of the terrain is rated expert, 40% intermediate, and only 10% beginner. The intermediate terrain is primarily on south-facing Apres Vous Mountain, while Rendezvous Mountain has Jackson Hole's more advanced terrain, including bowls, glades, and chutes. At over 4,000 vertical feet of skiing, Jackson Hole boasts one of the greatest continuous inbounds rises in the U.S., after nearby Big Sky, Montana, which has an overall vertical of 4,350 feet (1,326 m), but its continuous vertical is 700 feet (213 m) less; and Snowmass in Colorado, which has a vertical drop of 4,406 feet (1,343 m)). Timberline Lodge ski area on Mount Hood, East of Portland Oregon has the greatest vertical drop of any ski area in the United States at 4,540'. The Upper elevation is 8,540 and the lowest elevation is 4,000.

In addition to the skiable terrain in-bounds, there is an even larger area to be explored off-piste (out of bounds). These areas are accessed through marked gates by expert skiers/boarders who are equipped with avalanche safety gear.

Jackson Hole's original aerial tram was closed to the public in the spring of 2006 and replaced with a new tram that opened in 2008. The tram's vertical rise is 4,139 feet (1,262 m) to an elevation of 10,450 feet (3,185 m) above sea level. Construction on the new, 100-passenger Doppelmayr CTEC tram began the day after the Resort closed for the 2006-2007 ski season. Service began on December 20, 2008. During the two seasons without a tram, a temporary double chairlift named East Ridge was built to service the runs at the top of Rendezvous Mountain. This lift was subsequently moved and renamed the Marmot Chair, which provides access from the base of the Thunder Lift to the Bridger Gondola summit.

In the summer, the resort offers numerous activities such as mountain biking, hiking, paragliding, bungee trampoline, ropes course, rock climbing, and the Via ferrata in Casper Bowl at the top of the Bridger gondola. The resort and region is served by the Jackson Hole Airport KJAC, located 11 miles north east of Teton Village and offers seasonal service to 20 cities across the United States.

== History ==
The JHMR tram (Pre-2006) in the summer

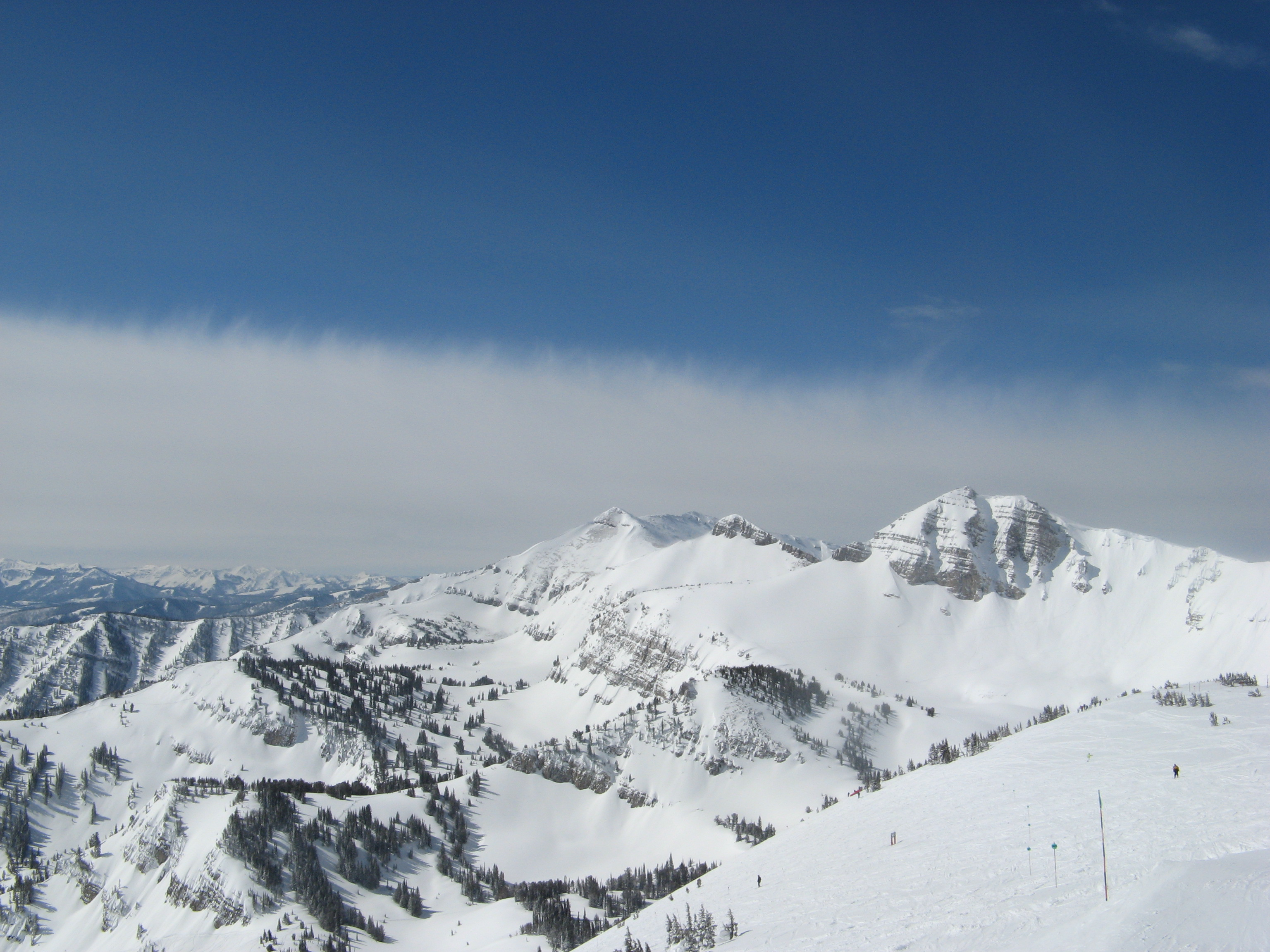
A view looking south from the top of Rendezvous Bowl (March 2008)

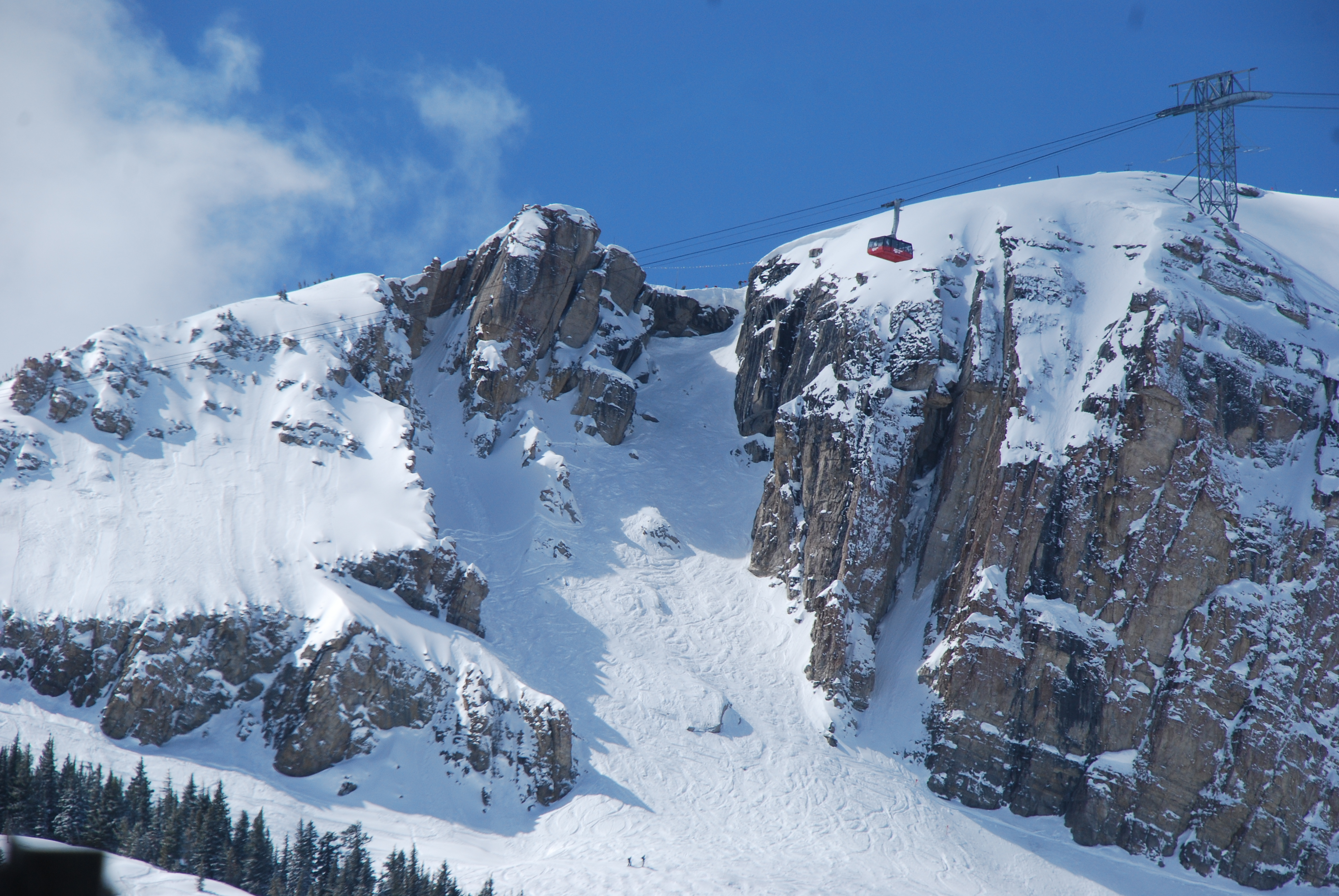
Corbet's Couloir 2010

Before 1961, the area of the future resort was the Crystal Springs Girl Scout Ranch. Paul McCollister purchased the ranch and formed the Jackson Hole Ski Corporation in 1963 with partners Alex Morley and Gordon Graham. Construction began a year later, and Apres Vous mountain opened to the public the 1965-66 winter with 3 double chairlifts. Eagles rest, Teewinot, and Apres Vous. The original tram on Rendezvous opened on July 31, 1966; with capacity for 62 people and 1 conductor. It took between 8–12 minutes, depending on speed set, to reach the summit of Rendezvous Mountain at 10,450 ft. The Aerial Tram officially opened to the skiing public Winter Season 1966/67. The Resort opened winter of 1965/66 and reigning Olympic gold medalist Josef "Pepi" Stiegler of Austria was hired that same year as ski school director. In 1992, McCollister sold his interests in the resort to John Kemmerer III. From there, the Kemmerer Family made multiple new changes to the resort, including new lifts, hotels, and new ski runs.

Jackson Hole hosted World Cup ski races in the inaugural 1967 season, and again in 1970 and 1975. The most recent races in 1975 were downhills, won by Franz Klammer and Marie-Theres Nadig. The first national Powder 8 Championship was held at Jackson Hole in 1970.

== Avalanches ==
Jackson Hole was the site of two in-bounds avalanches in late 2008, first on December 27 and another two days later on December 29. The first avalanche resulted in the death of skier David Nodine, one of three in-bound deaths in the American West in the 2008-09 ski season, the most since three skiers were killed at Alpine Meadows in 1976. The second avalanche occurred in the Headwall area and buried part of the Bridger Restaurant but resulted in no injuries.

== Lifts ==
- Jackson Hole has 13 lifts.
