= Corbet Wood and Grinshill =

Protected area in the United Kingdom

Coordinates: 52.810°N 2.713°W

Corbet Wood Countryside Heritage Site and Grinshill Site is a mixture of a woodland and quarrying site in Shropshire. It has been designated a SSSI due to the importance of geology in this area.

== Location ==
Corbet Wood is located west of the A49 between Shrewsbury and Wem. Grid reference SJ 525237. Corbet Wood is joint with Grinshill (a sandstone outcrop), this outcrop reaches a height of 192m.

== Recreational activities ==
Walking routes are available, with most pathways rugged due to the steep slopes, so good footwear is needed. Recently a family friendly route has been designed on site.

The Grinshill sandstone ridge holds a good view showing South Shropshire and the Welsh Borders.

== Wildlife ==
The mixed woodland of coniferous and broad leaf trees covering the quarried sandstone edges mean this site is host to a wide range of woodland birds. Species recorded include coal tits and goldcrests as well as some warblers and woodpeckers. In addition to birds, more than 120 species of butterflies and moths are present throughout the site. Situated at the top of the ridge, remains some relic heathland.

== Background ==
This site was quarried for centuries and is therefore a historic site of quarrying industry. Some geologists have found fossilized remains of a Triassic reptile making this site even more interesting to geologists. Geologists have also found rain prints and different layers of rock formation in the exposed rock faces.

Due to this geological importance, it has been given two more designations; as a county wildlife site, and on 30 January 2006 a Local Nature Reserve.

== Management plan information ==
At the end of 2010 the management plan was reviewed for this site. No major changes occurred and only dates needed to be changed. At the moment the management plan has 10 objectives, some of which includes 95% yew covering the area, and to make sure that only a maximum of 10% of the summit is bare ground.

== History ==
Corbet and Grinshill wood were part of a project involving an archaeological survey. For hundreds of years this area was exploited by quarries for building stone, made available by the geology. The result of this project found 135 features, mostly linked with the post-medieval quarrying that took place, and some ruined cottages and settlement sites, possibly the quarry workers cottages.
