= XIII Minutes =

American metal band

- Origin: Tulsa, Oklahoma, U.S.
- Genres: Christian metal; nu metal; post-hardcore; groove metal; metalcore
- Years active: 2015–present
- Label: Independent
- Members: Jamie Kucinski; Jerrod Cunningham; John Watson
- Past members: John Walker; Horace Young; Michael Rowley; Aaron Smith; Preston Bell; Aaron Hobbs; Jordan Harvey; Thomas Wheat
- Website: https://linktree/xiiiminutesofficial

XIII Minutes, also known as Thirteen Minutes, is an American alternative metal and metalcore band that was formed in late 2015 out of Tulsa, Oklahoma. The band was signed to Rottweiler Records.

== History ==
XIII Minutes began in late 2015, originating out of Tulsa, Oklahoma. At the time, Jamie Kucinski and Aaron Smith were in another band. The other band lost their vocalist, which led to the two searching for a new vocalist. The two found Michael Rowley. The band quickly shifted into Thirteen Minutes, with the three also adding rhythm guitarist Horace Young and bassist John Walker. The band worked on material for a long period of time, eventually signing with Rottweiler Records. In an agreement between Rottweiler and the band, they decided to release material in the form of two song releases titled digital 45s. With the agreement in place, the band debuted with the release of their first D45, Sibling Rivalry. The D45 was followed up by the releases of Macharia, Obsessed, and Water Vice. On April 5, 2019, the band released their album, Obsessed, which had become a long-awaited release. The album was very well received, receiving high reviews. In 2020, the band announced they would be taking a brief hiatus, as lead guitarist Aaron Smith departed the band due to undisclosed reasons.

On March 5, 2021, co-founder and drummer Jamie Kucinski announced the band was on indefinite hiatus. In early 2022, XIII Minutes announced their return and were auditioning vocalists finally announcing Aaron Hobbs as their new vocalist in late 2022 who only lasted four shows.

On June 7, 2023, it was announced on Facebook that labelmate I Am the Pendragon's Jerrod Cunningham would be assuming vocalist duties beginning in September.

XIII Minutes signed with NRT Music and Full Circle Entertainment in February 2025.

== Members ==
Current

- Jerrod Cunningham – lead vocals (2023–present)
- Jamie Kucinski – drums (2015–present)
- John Watson - bass (2025), guitar and backing vocals (2026-present)
- Preston Bell - bass and backing vocals (2023-2024) (touring 2025-present)

Former

- Horace Young – rhythm guitar (2016–2017)
- John Walker – bass (2017–2018)
- Michael Rowley – vocals (2016–2020)
- Aaron Smith – lead guitar (2015–2020)
- Jordan Harvey - lead guitar (2022–2023)
- Aaron Hobbs - vocals (2022–2023)
- Thomas Wheat – bass (2019–2020), guitar and backing vocals (2022–2025)

Timeline

== Discography ==
Studio albums

- Obsessed (2019)
- Stay (EP) (2025)

D45s

- Sibling Rivalry (2017)
- Macharia (2017)
- Obsessed (2017)
- Water Vice (2018)

Singles

- "Obsessed (Death Therapy Remix)" featuring Jason Wisdom (2022)
- "Cult Leader" (2024)
- "Pitiful" (2024)
- "Stay" featuring Misstiq (2025)
- "Who Told You?" (2025)
- "Fake" (2025)
- "Panic" (2026)
- "Seeing Is Deceiving" (2026)
