= Christopher Voelker =

American photographer (born 1961)

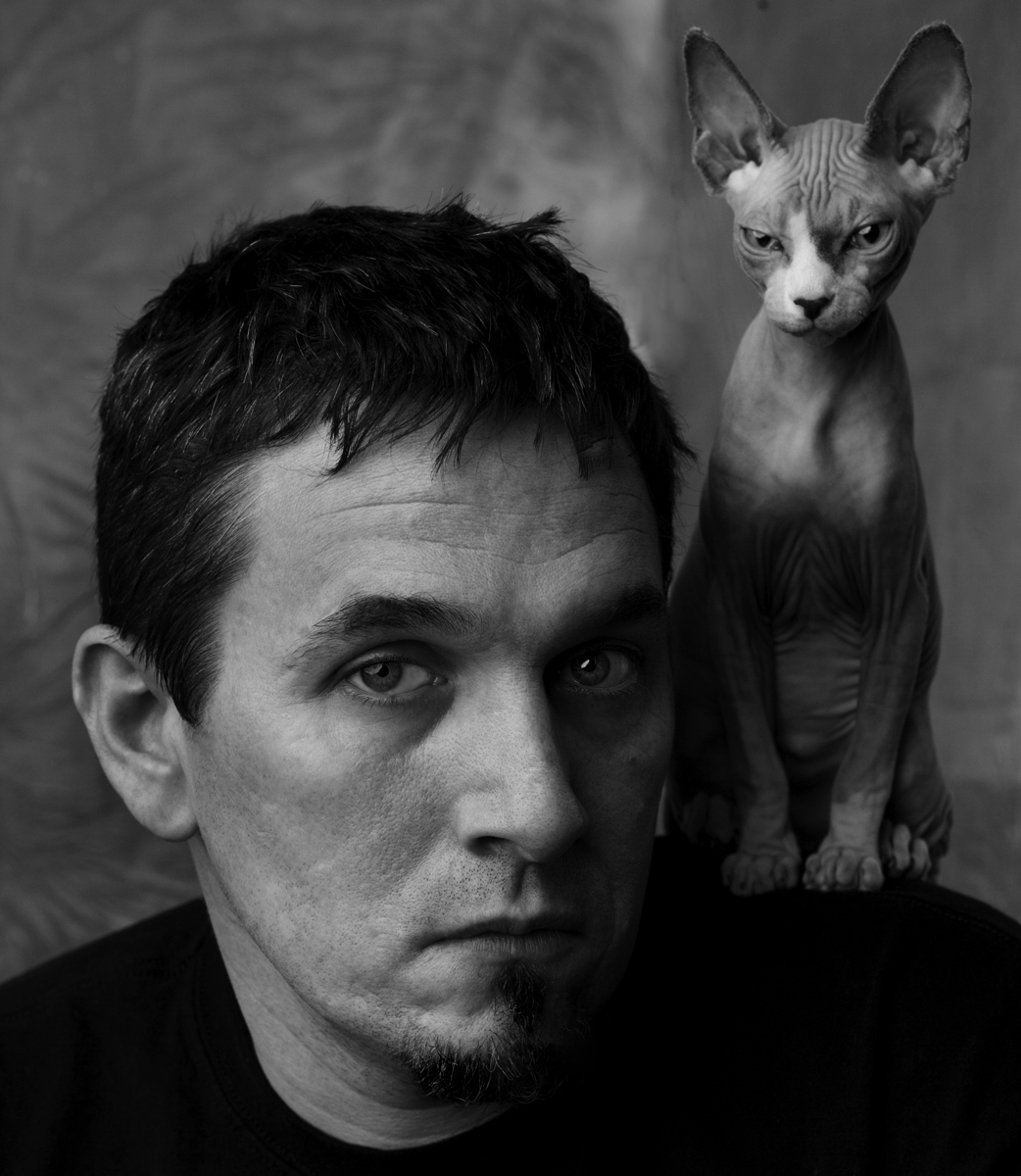
Christopher Voelker

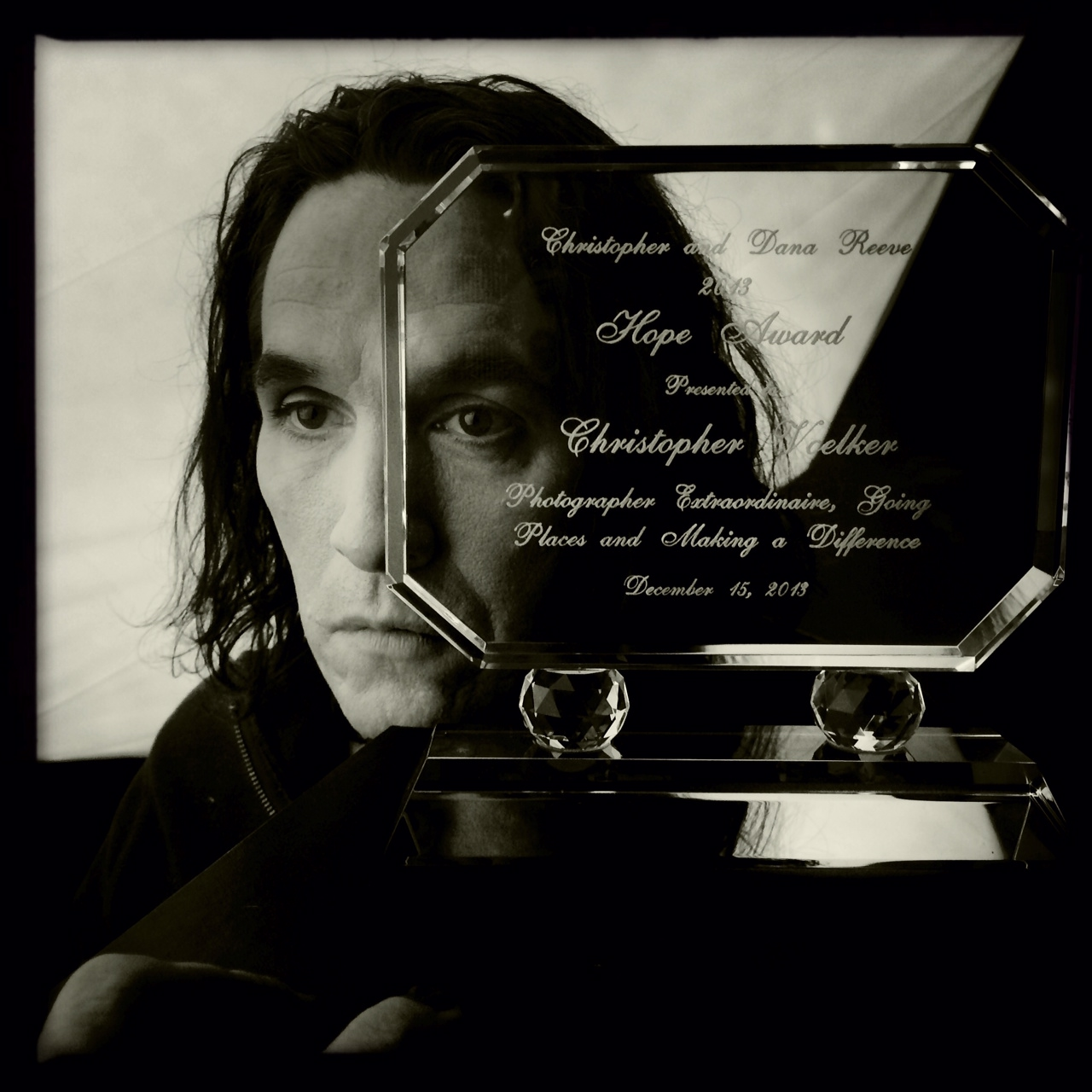
Christopher Voelker with Hope Award

Christopher Voelker (born February 2, 1961, in Los Angeles, California - Died September 11, 2014) was an American photographer.

== General information ==
Voelker was a full-time wheelchair user due to a spinal cord injury (quadriplegia) from a high-speed, motocross accident at 16.

He was predominantly self-taught, freelance studio photographer specializing in capturing counter-points of the human landscape in large-format (Hasselblad and Linhof), black and white. Hand developed prints which are an interpretation of his negatives are characterized by starkly voluptuous contrasts of body and space. The prints are expressions of something that is both personal and available for individual interpretation. With the arrival of digital photography it was a challenge that Voelker embraced. His true love, however, remained the mystery of emulsion; and film is the medium he reserves for his artistic output.

== Major studios and TV networks ==
He became the first photographer with a mobility impairment to work professionally for major studios and TV networks such as Universal, Paramount, Touchstone, NBC, CBS, Lorimar Productions, UPN, WB and CW networks. Voelker has also photographed such artists as Mick Fleetwood, Billy Zane, Carmen Electra, Robert David Hall, Christina Applegate, Bow Wow, Beyoncé, Chris Burke, Brandy, Chingy, Omarion, Ruben Studdard, Fantasia, Angela Simmons and Tony Orlando.

== Publications ==
His work has appeared on national and international covers for magazines along with movie posters including The Hollywood Reporter, V Life Magazine, Teen People, TV Guide, Angeleno Magazine, Zink Magazine, 944 Magazine, New Mobility, Mobilitá Magazine, Jewel Magazine and RYK Magazine.

He has developed a penchant for photographing bookjackets and has completed over 20 different covers ranging from Mystery writers to a book by Holly Robinson Peete on a Woman's guide to watching & understanding NFL football, titled Get your Own Damn Beer I’m watching The Game.

His photographs have been exhibited in both Los Angeles and New York City and will be featured in his upcoming book of black-and-white studio nudes due to be published in November 2008 by Dennis McMillan Publications.

== Voelker Studio ==
Voelker worked for network gallery sessions, album covers and intimate portraits. He has spent the last 15 years at Voelker Studio, a synergistic space in Northridge, California. Going through different physical experiences has given Voelker unique empathy and insights into things that other people don't see. He has become a photographer of humans. Voelker was compiling "Portraits of Ability". The book, set for publication in 2009 celebrates the physicality of power as realized by personal accomplishment of disabled people.

== Awards and prizes ==
- 1984 – Photographer of the Year for his work in the Journalism State of California Magazine
- 2002 – Annual Anthony Award for Best Cover, Print Magazine Design for the quality of his work
- 2013 - Christopher and Dana Reeve Foundation Hope Award for his ongoing support to the disability community
