= Silverstein Peak =

Mountain in Antarctica

Location of Sentinel Range in Western Antarctica.

Sentinel Range map.

Silverstein Peak is a prominent, 4,790-metre-high (15,720 ft) peak on the west edge of the ice-covered Vinson Plateau in the Sentinel Range of Ellsworth Mountains, Antarctica. It surmounts Roché Glacier to the north and Zapol Glacier to the southwest.

The peak was named by US-ACAN in 2006 after Dr. Samuel C. Silverstein, member of the 1966-67 American Antarctic Mountaineering Expedition that made the first ascent of Vinson Massif and other high mountains in the Sentinel Range.

== Location ==
Silverstein Peak is located at 78°32′51″S 85°38′57″W, which is 2.56 kilometres (1.59 mi) south-southwest of the summit Mount Vinson, 1.37 kilometres (0.85 mi) west by south of Hollister Peak, 2.66 kilometres (1.65 mi) north-northwest of Opalchenie Peak and 1.32 kilometres (0.82 mi) east of Príncipe de Asturias Peak. USGS mapping in 1961, updated in 1988.

== Maps ==
- Vinson Massif. Scale 1:250 000 topographic map. Reston, Virginia: US Geological Survey, 1988.
- D. Gildea and C. Rada. Vinson Massif and the Sentinel Range. Scale 1:50 000 topographic map. Omega Foundation, 2007.
- Antarctic Digital Database (ADD). Scale 1:250000 topographic map of Antarctica. Scientific Committee on Antarctic Research (SCAR). Since 1993, regularly updated.
