= Roper-Corbet =

English automobile model manufactured between 1911 and 1913

The Roper-Corbet was an English automobile manufactured from 1911 until 1913 and sold by the London and Parisian Motor Co Ltd. Its maker is not known. A four-cylinder, 2412 cc 14/16 hp model was exhibited at the London motor show in 1911. It was advertised for £350 complete.
