= Vinson Plateau =

Plateau in Antarctica

Location of Sentinel Range in Western Antarctica.

Vinson Massif map.

Vinson Plateau is the summit plateau of Vinson Massif, Sentinel Range in Ellsworth Mountains, Antarctica. It extends for 9 km between Goodge Col and Hammer Col linking it to the north-central part of Sentinel Range to the north-northwest and to Craddock Massif to the south-southeast respectively, and 4.5 km wide between Branscomb Peak and Silverstein Peak to the west and Schoening Peak and Marts Peak to the east. Elevation from 4000 m to 4600 m above sea level. Rising from the plateau is the summit of Antarctica Mount Vinson (4892 m), and several other peaks higher than 4700 m, albeit of modest prominence: Clinch Peak (4841 m), Corbet Peak (4822 m), Silverstein Peak (4790 m), Schoening Peak (4743 m) and Hollister Peak (4729 m). The lower peaks of Fukushima (4634 m) and Opalchenie (4500 m) stand at the south extremity of the plateau. Its central part is drained by Roché Glacier and a tributary glacier in Jacobsen Valley, with both of them joining Branscomb Glacier.

The plateau takes its name from Vinson Massif, honouring the US statesman Carl Vinson (1883–1981).

== Location ==
Vinson Plateau is centred at 78°32′00″S 85°35′00″W. US mapping in 1961, 1988 and 2007.

== Maps ==
- Vinson Massif. Scale 1:250 000 topographic map. Reston, Virginia: US Geological Survey, 1988.
- D. Gildea and C. Rada. Vinson Massif and the Sentinel Range. Scale 1:50 000 topographic map. Omega Foundation, 2007.
- Antarctic Digital Database (ADD). Scale 1:250000 topographic map of Antarctica. Scientific Committee on Antarctic Research (SCAR). Since 1993, regularly updated.
