= Opalchenie Peak =

Mountain in Ellsworth Land, Antarctica

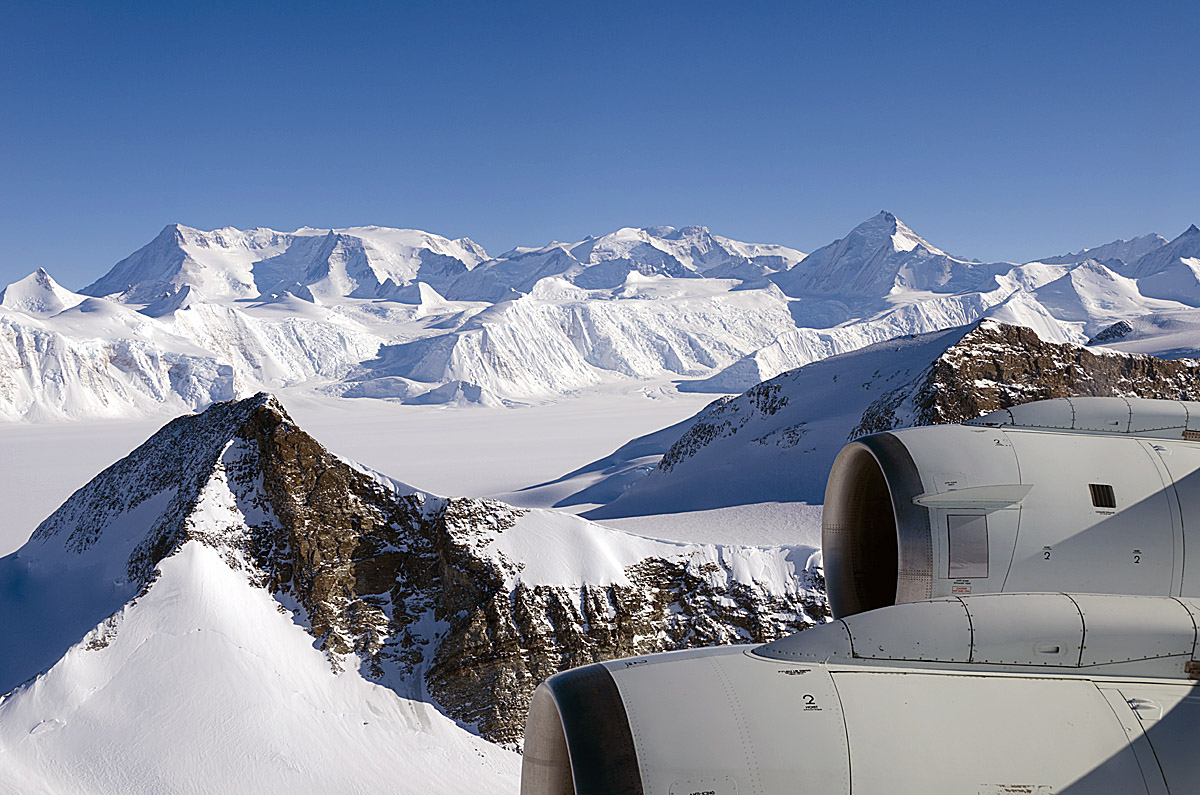
- Craddock Massif and Vinson Plateau in the left background, east view from above Rutford Ice Stream, West Antarctica

Highest point
- Elevation: 4,507 m (14,787 ft)
- Prominence: 63 m (207 ft)
- Isolation: 0.8 km (0.50 mi)
- Coordinates: 78°34′02″S 85°34′53″W

Geography
- Location within Antarctica
- Location: Ellsworth Mountains
- Parent range: Sentinel Range

Climbing
- First ascent: Unclimbed
- Easiest route: Rock/ice climb

Opalchenie Peak (Bulgarian: връх Опълчение, romanized: vrah Opalchenie, IPA: [ˈvrɤx opɐɫˈt͡ʃɛniɛ]) is the peak rising to 4,507 metres (14,787 ft) at the south extremity of the ice-covered Vinson Plateau, Sentinel Range in the Ellsworth Mountains, Antarctica. It is of low topographic prominence, just 63 metres (207 ft), with parent summit Fukushima Peak (4,634 metres (15,203 ft)). The feature has a partly ice-free summit and south slopes, where two parallel ridges descend steeply southwestwards with Donnellan Glacier flowing in between and Mount Slaughter rising on the more southerly ridge. The northerly ridge was climbed up to the summit plateau by American Robert Anderson in November 1992, and subsequently used to establish a new route to Mount Vinson in 2003. Opalchenie Peak overlooks Vinson Plateau on the north, Craddock Massif on the southeast and upper Nimitz Glacier area on the southwest.

The peak is named after the Bulgarian Volunteer Force in the 1877-1878 Russo-Turkish War and the Macedonian-Adrianople Volunteer Force in the 1912-1913 Balkan Wars, "opalchenie" being the Bulgarian word for "volunteer force".

== Location ==
Opalchenie Peak is located at 78°34′02″S 85°34′53″W, which is 4.73 kilometres (2.94 mi) south by east of Mount Vinson, 990 metres (1,080 yd) south of Fukushima Peak, 5.2 kilometres (3.2 mi) southwest of Schoening Peak, 7.49 kilometres (4.65 mi) northwest of Mount Rutford, 4.09 kilometres (2.54 mi) north by east of Mount Slaughter, 7.41 kilometres (4.60 mi) east of Brichebor Peak and 2.66 kilometres (1.65 mi) southeast of Silverstein Peak. USGS mapping in 1961, updated in 1988.

== Maps ==
- Vinson Massif. Scale 1:250 000 topographic map. Reston, Virginia: US Geological Survey, 1988
- D. Gildea and C. Rada. Vinson Massif and the Sentinel Range. Scale 1:50 000 topographic map. Omega Foundation, 2007
- Antarctic Digital Database (ADD). Scale 1:250000 topographic map of Antarctica. Scientific Committee on Antarctic Research (SCAR). Since 1993, regularly updated

== Honours ==
Opalchenie Peak Street in the city of Sofia is named after the feature.

== See also ==
- Mountains in Antarctica
- Four-thousander

== Gallery ==
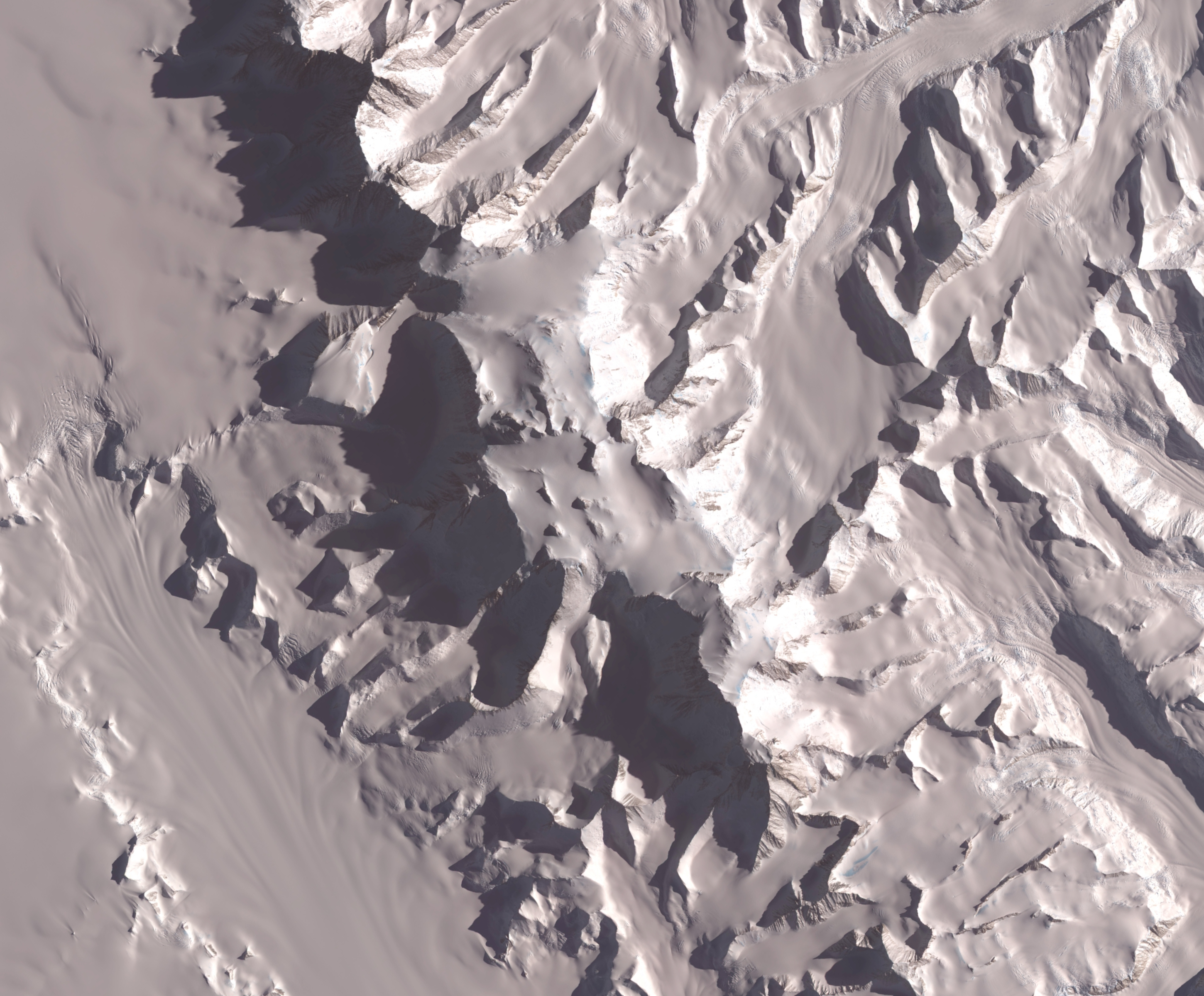
NASA image of Sentinel Range centred on Vinson Plateau and featuring Opalchenie Peak

Location of Sentinel Range in West Antarctica

USGS map of central and southern Sentinel Range
