= Hammer Col =

- Location of Sentinel Range in Western Antarctica.

Highest point
- Elevation: 3,800 m (12,500 ft)
- Coordinates: 78°34′S 85°23′W

Geography
- Location: Western Antarctica
- Parent range: Sentinel Range

Sentinel Range map.

Hammer Col is a broad ice-covered col at 3,800 metres (12,500 ft) elevation between the south part of the Vinson Massif and the Craddock Massif in the Sentinel Range of the Ellsworth Mountains, Antarctica. The 1.5-nautical-mile (3 km) wide saddle is relatively level and visually separates the two massifs whether viewed from the east or the west. It is part of the glacial divide between the heads of Dater Glacier on the northeast and Gildea Glacier on the southwest.

The feature was named by the Advisory Committee on Antarctic Names (2006) after William R. Hammer of the Department of Geology, Augustana College, Rock Island, IL, a U.S. Antarctic Program investigator of vertebrate fossils, primarily in the central Transantarctic Mountains, 1977–2003.

== Maps ==
- Vinson Massif. Scale 1:250 000 topographic map. Reston, Virginia: US Geological Survey, 1988.
- D. Gildea and C. Rada. Vinson Massif and the Sentinel Range. Scale 1:50 000 topographic map. Omega Foundation, 2007.
- Antarctic Digital Database (ADD). Scale 1:250000 topographic map of Antarctica. Scientific Committee on Antarctic Research (SCAR). Since 1993, regularly updated.
