= Vinson Massif =

Largest mountain in Antarctica

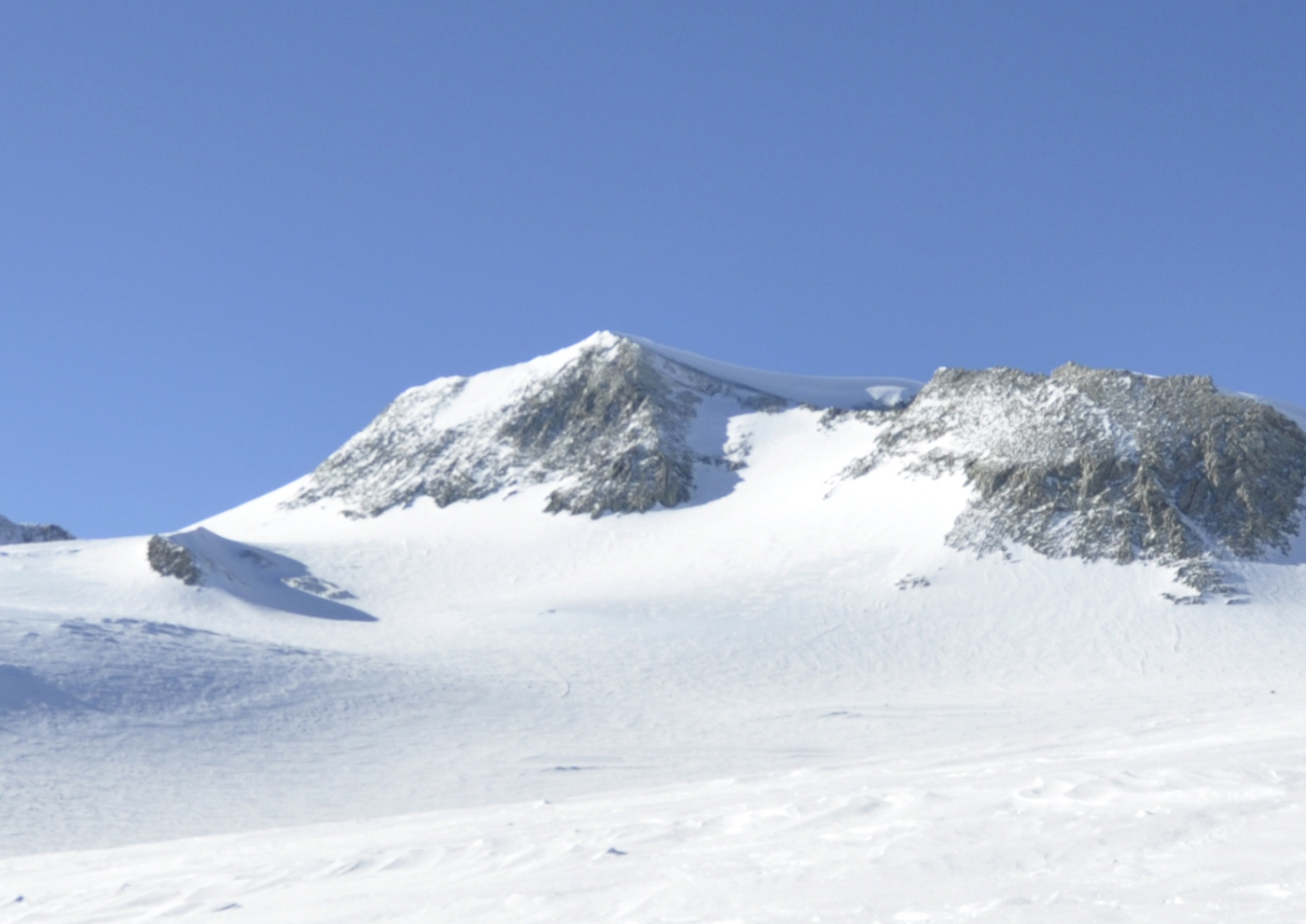
- Mount Vinson at Vinson Plateau

Highest point
- Elevation: 4,892 m (16,050 ft)
- Prominence: 4,892 m (16,050 ft); Ranked 8th
- Listing: Seven summits Ultra, Ribu; World's most isolated peaks 6th
- Coordinates: 78°31′32″S 85°37′02″W

Geography
- Location within Antarctica
- Location: Antarctica
- Parent range: Sentinel Range

Climbing
- First ascent: 1966 by Nicholas Clinch and party
- Easiest route: snow/ice climb

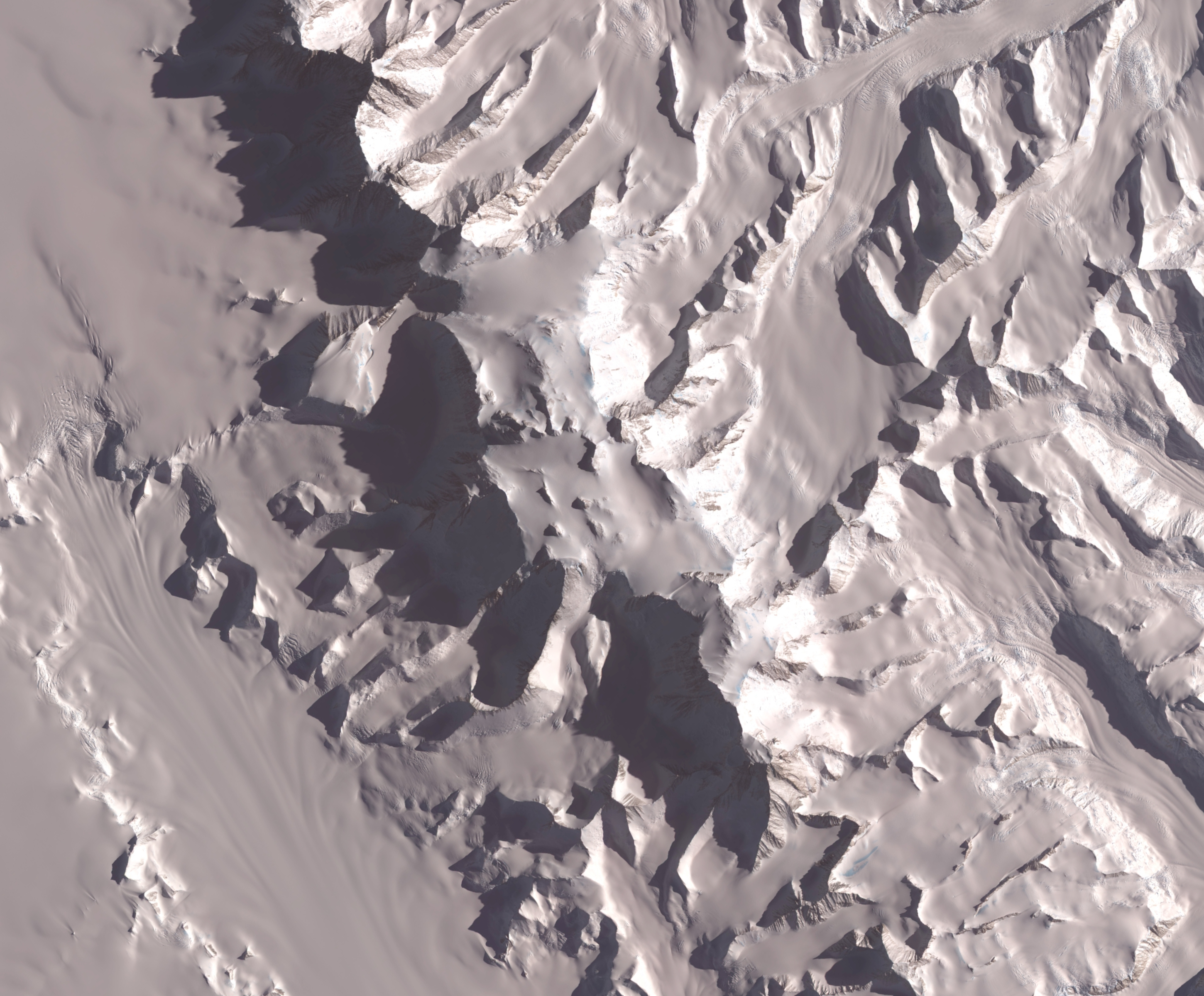
November 2002 NASA image of Vinson Massif from space

Map of central and southern Sentinel Range, Ellsworth Mountains with Vinson Massif.

Vinson Massif (/ˈvɪnsən mæˈsiːf/) is a large mountain massif in Antarctica that is 21 km (13 mi) long and 13 km (8 mi) wide and lies within the Sentinel Range of the Ellsworth Mountains. It overlooks the Ronne Ice Shelf near the base of the Antarctic Peninsula. The massif is located about 1,200 kilometers (750 mi) from the South Pole. Vinson Massif was discovered in January 1958 by U.S. Navy aircraft. In 1961, the Vinson Massif was named by the Advisory Committee on Antarctic Names (US-ACAN), after Carl G. Vinson, United States congressman from the state of Georgia, for his support for Antarctic exploration. On 1 November 2006, US-ACAN declared Mount Vinson and Vinson Massif to be separate entities. Vinson Massif lies within the unrecognized Chilean claim under the Antarctic Treaty System.

Mount Vinson is the highest peak in Antarctica, at 4,892 meters (16,050 ft). It lies in the north part of Vinson Massif's summit plateau in the south portion of the main ridge of the Sentinel Range about 2 kilometers (1 1/4 mi) north of Hollister Peak. It was first climbed in 1966 by an American team led by Nicholas Clinch. An expedition in 2001 was the first to climb via the Eastern route, and also took GPS measurements of the height of the peak. As of January 2025, 3,500 climbers have successfully reached the summit of Mount Vinson. Mount Vinson is ranked 6th by topographic isolation.

== Geography ==
The Vinson Massif extends between Goodge Col and Branscomb Glacier to the northwest, Nimitz Glacier and Gildea Glacier to the southwest and south, and Dater Glacier and its tributary Hinkley Glacier to the east. The southeastern part of the massif ends at Hammer Col, which joins it to the Craddock Massif, of which the highest point is Mount Rutford (4,477 metres or 14,688 feet). The massif comprises both the high central Vinson Plateau with its few peaks rising to over 4,700 metres or 15,420 feet, and several side ridges mostly trending southwest or northeast from the plateau.

The current height (4,892 metres or 16,050 feet) of Mount Vinson was measured by a GPS survey that was conducted by the 2004 Omega Foundation team comprising Damien Gildea of Australia (leader) and Rodrigo Fica and Camilo Rada of Chile. From 1998 through at least 2007, the Omega Foundation kept a GPS receiver on the summit for a suitable period of time to obtain accurate satellite readings.

== Geology ==
Steeply inclined strata known as the Crashsite Group forms Vinson Massif. It consists of 3,000 metres or 9,843 feet of shallow-water, mostly marine, tan, green, and red quartzose sandstones (quartzites) and argillites. In ascending order, the Crashsite Group is subdivided into the Howard Nunataks Formation (1,630 metres or 5,348 feet), the Mount Liptak Formation (1,070 metres or 3,510 feet), and the Mount Wyatt Earp Formation (300 meters or 980 feet). Erosion-resistant and steeply inclined beds of the Mount Wyatt Earp Formation comprise the crest of the Vinson Massif, including Mount Vinson. The steeply inclined strata of the Crashsite Group are part of the western limb of a major syncline that forms the core of the Sentinel Range within the Ellsworth Mountains. The Mount Wyatt Earp Formation contains Devonian fossils. The transition beds at the base of the Crashsite Group contain Late Cambrian trilobites. The intervening lower parts of the Crashsite Group likely include Ordovician and Silurian strata.

== Climate and glaciers ==
The climate on Mount Vinson is generally controlled by the polar ice cap's high-pressure system, creating predominantly stable conditions but, as in any polar climate, high winds and snowfall are a possibility. Though the annual snowfall on Mount Vinson is low, high winds can cause base camp accumulations up to 46 centimetres (18 in) in a year. During the summer season, November through January, there are 24 hours of sunlight. While the average temperature during these months is −30 °C (−20 °F), the intense sun will melt snow on dark objects.

Over successive years, the limited amount of snow that falls on Vinson Massif compacts and is transformed into ice, forming glaciers. These glaciers follow the topography and flow down the mountain's valleys. The uppermost glacier occupies Jacobsen Valley on the north face of Mount Vinson, and flows either into Branscomb Glacier to the west or Crosswell Glacier to the east. The Crosswell Glacier flows into the Rutford Ice Stream via Ellen Glacier. The south face of Mount Vinson is drained by Roché Glacier, which flows westwards into Branscomb Glacier, with the latter leaving Vinson Massif to join Nimitz Glacier.

== History ==
A high mountain, provisionally known as "Vinson", was long suspected to be in this part of West Antarctica, but it was not actually seen until January 1958, when it was spotted by US Navy aircraft from Byrd Station. It was named after Carl Vinson, a United States Representative from Georgia who was a key supporter of funding for Antarctic research. The first measurement of the Vinson Massif was established in 1959 at the elevation of 5,140 m (16,864 ft).

=== First ascent ===
In 1963, two groups within the American Alpine Club (AAC), one led by Charles D. Hollister and Samuel C. Silverstein, M.D., then in New York, and the other led by Peter Schoening of Seattle, Washington, began lobbying the National Science Foundation to support an expedition to climb Mount Vinson. The two groups merged in spring 1966 at the urging of the National Science Foundation and the AAC and Nicholas Clinch was recruited by the AAC to lead the merged expeditions. Officially named the American Antarctic Mountaineering Expedition (AAME) 1966/67, the expedition was sponsored by the AAC and the National Geographic Society, and supported in the field by the U.S. Navy and the National Science Foundation Office of Antarctic Programs. Ten scientists and mountaineers participated in AAME 1966/67. In addition to Clinch they were Barry Corbet, John Evans (University of Minnesota), Eiichi Fukushima (University of Washington, Seattle), Charles Hollister, Ph.D. (Columbia University), William Long, (Alaska Methodist University), Brian Marts, Peter Schoening, Samuel Silverstein, (Rockefeller University) and Richard Wahlstrom.

In the months prior to its departure for Antarctica, the expedition received considerable press attention, primarily because of reports that Woodrow Wilson Sayre and four companions were planning to fly in a Piper Apache into the Sentinel Range to climb Mount Vinson. They would be piloted by Max Conrad, the "flying Grandfather". Sayre had a reputation for problematic trips as a result of his unauthorized, unsuccessful, and nearly fatal attempt to climb Mount Everest from the North in 1962. His unauthorized incursion into Tibet led China to file an official protest with the U.S. State Department. In the end, the purported race did not materialize as Conrad had difficulties with his plane. According to press reports, he and Sayre were still in Buenos Aires on the day the first four members of AAME 1966/67 reached Mount Vinson's summit.

In December 1966 the Navy transported the expedition and its supplies from Christchurch, New Zealand to the U.S. base at McMurdo Sound, Antarctica, and from there in a ski-equipped C-130 Hercules to the Sentinel Range. All members of the expedition reached the summit of Mount Vinson. The first group of four climbers summited on 18 December 1966, three more on 19 December, and the last three on 20 December.

On 17 August 2006, from nomination by Damien Gildea of the Omega Foundation, US-ACAN approved naming the subsidiary peaks south of Mount Vinson for the AAME 1966/67 members Nicholas Clinch, Barry Corbet, Eiichi Fukushima, Charles Hollister, Brian Marts, Samuel Silverstein, Peter Schoening and Richard Wahlstrom. Other peaks in the Sentinel Range had previously been named for John Evans and William Long.

=== Later ascents ===
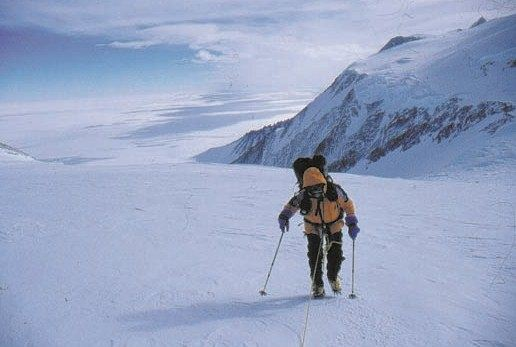
Gavin Bate ascending Mount Vinson in 2000

The climb of Vinson offers little technical difficulty beyond the usual hazards of travel in Antarctica, and as one of the Seven Summits, it has received much attention from well-funded climbers in recent years. Multiple guide companies offer guided expeditions to Mount Vinson, at a typical cost of around US$45,000 per person, including transportation to Antarctica from Chile. The skyrunner Fernanda Maciel did the fastest ascent of Vinson in 6 hours and 40 minutes and round trip in 9 hours and 41 minutes from base camp.

In January 2008, four Alpini of the Italian Army — Ettore Taufer, Giovanni Amort, Elio Sganga, and Marco Farina — completed the first ascent of Mount Vinson via a new route after a 270 km (170 mi) overland traverse from Patriot Hills. Unlike other expeditions, which are flown by helicopter to the mountain's base camp, the team skied the entire approach while hauling 75 kg (165 lb) sledges. The route had never been attempted before and required 13 days of travel across Antarctic terrain to reach the base camp. The ascent from 2,125 m (6,972 ft) to the 4,897 m (16,066 ft) summit was completed over two days, with an intermediate camp at 3,940 m (12,930 ft). This remains one of the longest unsupported approaches to Mount Vinson recorded.

=== First ascent from east side ===
While the vast majority of prior climbs to the summit have used the western side of the massif from the Branscomb Glacier, the first ascent from the east side was completed by an eight-person team sponsored by NOVA in January 2001. The team consisted of:

- Conrad Anker – expedition leader
- Jon Krakauer – mountaineer and author
- Dave Hahn – mountain guide with 34 ascents, including ascents to Gardner, and Shinn.
- Andrew Mclean – extreme skier
- Dan Stone – glaciologist
- Liesl Clark – producer
- John Armstrong – cameraman
- Rob Raker – assistant cameraman and sound recording

The team not only made the first ascent from the east side but also performed scientific research into snow accumulation at different elevations as well as taking the first ground-based GPS reading from the summit. The GPS reading gave the elevation of the highest point in Antarctica as 4,900 m (16,077 ft), eclipsing the earlier established heights recorded in 1959 and 1979.

Another first was the successful aircraft landing of a Twin Otter on the Upper Dater Glacier on the eastern slopes of Mount Vinson.

NOVA named the production "Mountain of Ice", which first aired on PBS in February 2003.

== See also ==
- Vinson Plateau
- Mount Sidley – highest volcano in Antarctica
- Seven Summits

== Maps ==
- Vinson Massif. Scale 1:250 000 topographic map. Reston, Virginia: US Geological Survey, 1988.
- D. Gildea and C. Rada. Vinson Massif and the Sentinel Range. Scale 1:50 000 topographic map. Omega Foundation, 2007.
- Antarctic Digital Database (ADD). Scale 1:250000 topographic map of Antarctica. Scientific Committee on Antarctic Research (SCAR). Since 1993, regularly updated.
