= South Tyneside =

Metropolitan borough in Tyne & Wear, England

Metropolitan Borough of South Tyneside
- Metropolitan borough
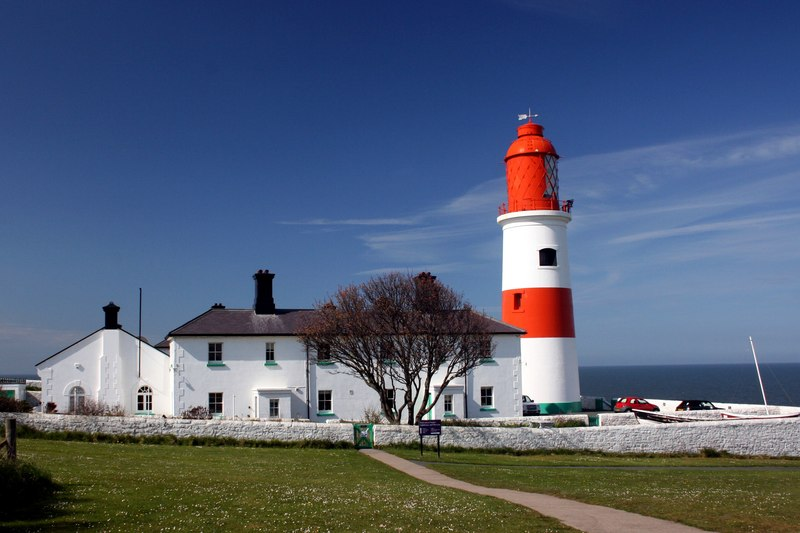
- Souter Lighthouse between South Shields and Whitburn

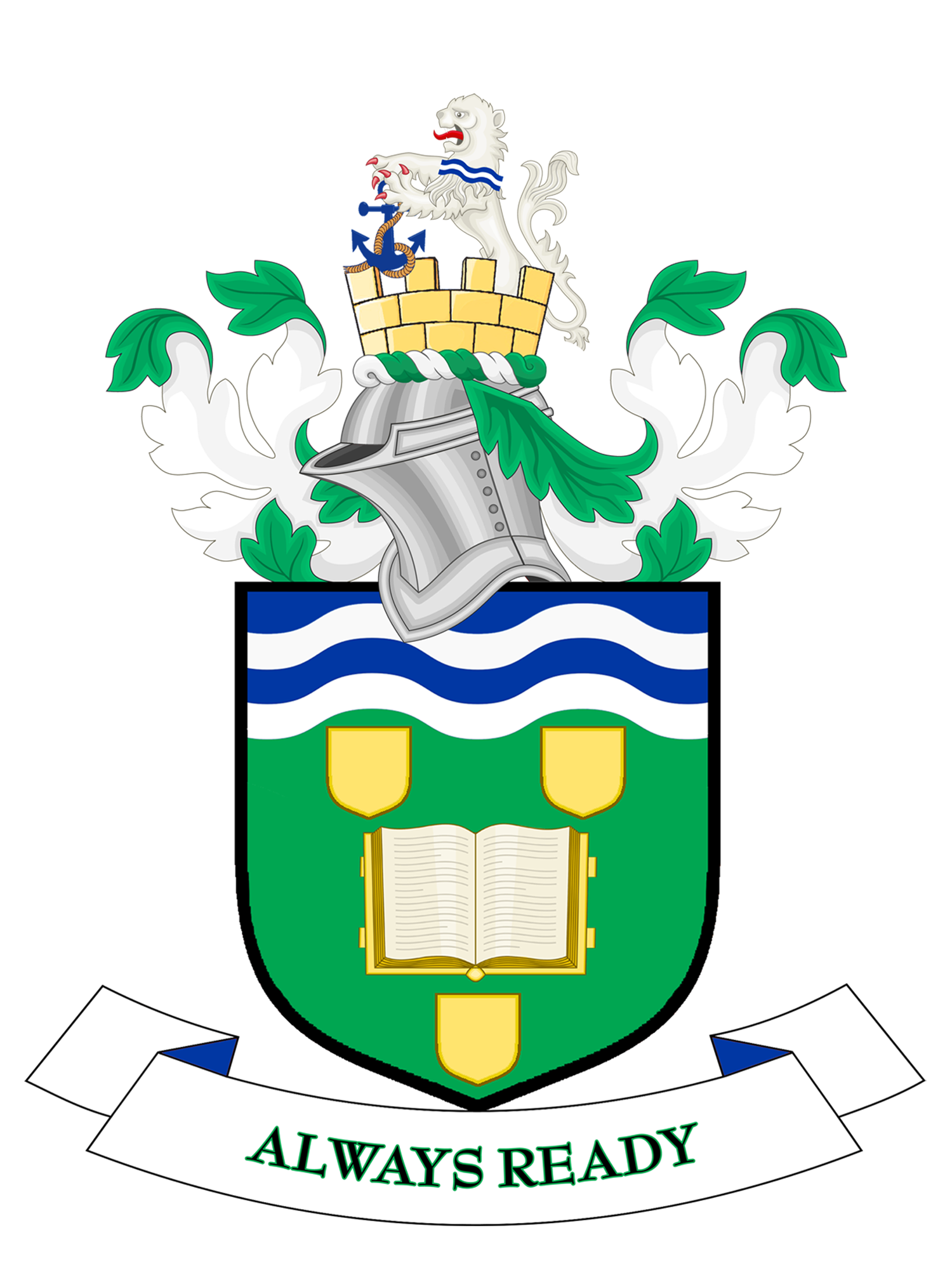
- Coat of arms
- Motto: Always Ready
- South Tyneside shown within Tyne and Wear
- Coordinates: 54.959°N 1.438°W
- Sovereign state: United Kingdom
- Country: England
- Region: North East
- Ceremonial county: Tyne and Wear
- City region: North East
- Incorporated: 1 April 1974
- Named for: River Tyne
- Administrative HQ: South Shields Town Hall

Government
  - Type: Metropolitan borough
  - Body: South Tyneside Council
  - Executive: Leader and cabinet
  - Control: Reform UK
  - MPs: Kate Osborne (L); Emma Lewell (L)

Area
  - Total: 64 km^{2} (25 sq mi)
  - Rank: 231st

Population (2024)
  - Total: 151,393
  - Rank: 149th
  - Density: 2,350/km^{2} (6,100/sq mi)

Ethnicity (2021)
  - Ethnic groups: List: 94.4% White; 2.9% Asian; 1.4% Mixed; 0.5% Black; 0.8% other

Religion (2021)
  - Religion: List: 52.6% Christianity; 39.3% no religion; 2.5% Islam; 0.3% Sikhism; 0.2% Buddhism; 0.2% Hinduism; 0.0% Judaism; 0.4% other; 4.5% not stated
- Time zone: UTC+0 (GMT)
  - Summer (DST): UTC+1 (BST)
- Postcode areas: NE
- Dialling codes: 0191
- ISO 3166 code: GB-STY
- GSS code: E08000023
- Website: southtyneside.gov.uk

South Tyneside is a metropolitan borough in the county of Tyne and Wear, England. It is bordered by all four other boroughs in Tyne and Wear: Gateshead to the west, Sunderland in the south, North Tyneside to the north and Newcastle upon Tyne to the north-west; the border county of Northumberland lies further north. The borough was formed on 1 April 1974 by the merger of the County Borough of South Shields with the municipal borough of Jarrow and the urban districts of Boldon and Hebburn from County Durham.

Part of the Tyneside conurbation, the sixth largest in the United Kingdom, South Tyneside has a geographical area of 24.88 mi^{2} (64.4 km^{2}) and an estimated population of 153,700 (mid-year 2010), measured at the 2011 Census as 148,127. It is bordered to the east by the North Sea and to the north by the River Tyne. A green belt of 9.13 mi^{2} (23.6 km^{2}) is at its southern boundary.

The main administrative centre and largest town is South Shields. Other riverside towns are Jarrow and Hebburn, while the villages of Cleadon, Whitburn and The Boldons border the South Tyneside green belt, with Wearside to the south at Sunderland.

== History ==
Celts, Romans, Angles, Saxons, Jutes, Vikings, the early 20th century arrival of the Arabs and more recently the settling of people from the Commonwealth, notably the Indian sub-continent, and the European Union reflect the present-day culture of South Tyneside.

In South Shields (Latin: Arbeia, Brythonic: Caer Urfa), excavations and a reconstructed fort are found at Arbeia (AD 160). This fort served as a garrison and an outpost of the Roman Empire, and is part of Hadrian's Wall World Heritage Site. The hospitality strip at Ocean Road is famed throughout the region for its Indian, Italian, Middle Eastern and Chinese cuisine. Mill Dam, with former Customs House (now a theatre, cinema and arts complex), cobbled lanes and Mission to Seafarers centre, relate to the history of shipping in the town and the River Tyne.

Bede's World in Jarrow (Old English: Gyrwe) is dedicated to the life of the Venerable Bede, the 'Father of English History'. The nominated World Heritage Site is straddled by two rivers – the Tyne and the Don. There is a medieval monastery (St. Paul's Church, AD 681), an Anglo-Saxon farm with rare-breed animals and buildings constructed in original materials from that period, and the Georgian Jarrow Hall. The Jarrow Crusade of 1936 was a key event in the town's history and the original banner carried by the marchers to London can be viewed at Jarrow Town Hall.

There has been a fairly sizeable Arab community in South Shields since the 1890s. This is also one hypothesised explanation of the term Sandancer (derived from "sand dancer") for people born and brought up in South Shields.

== Governance ==
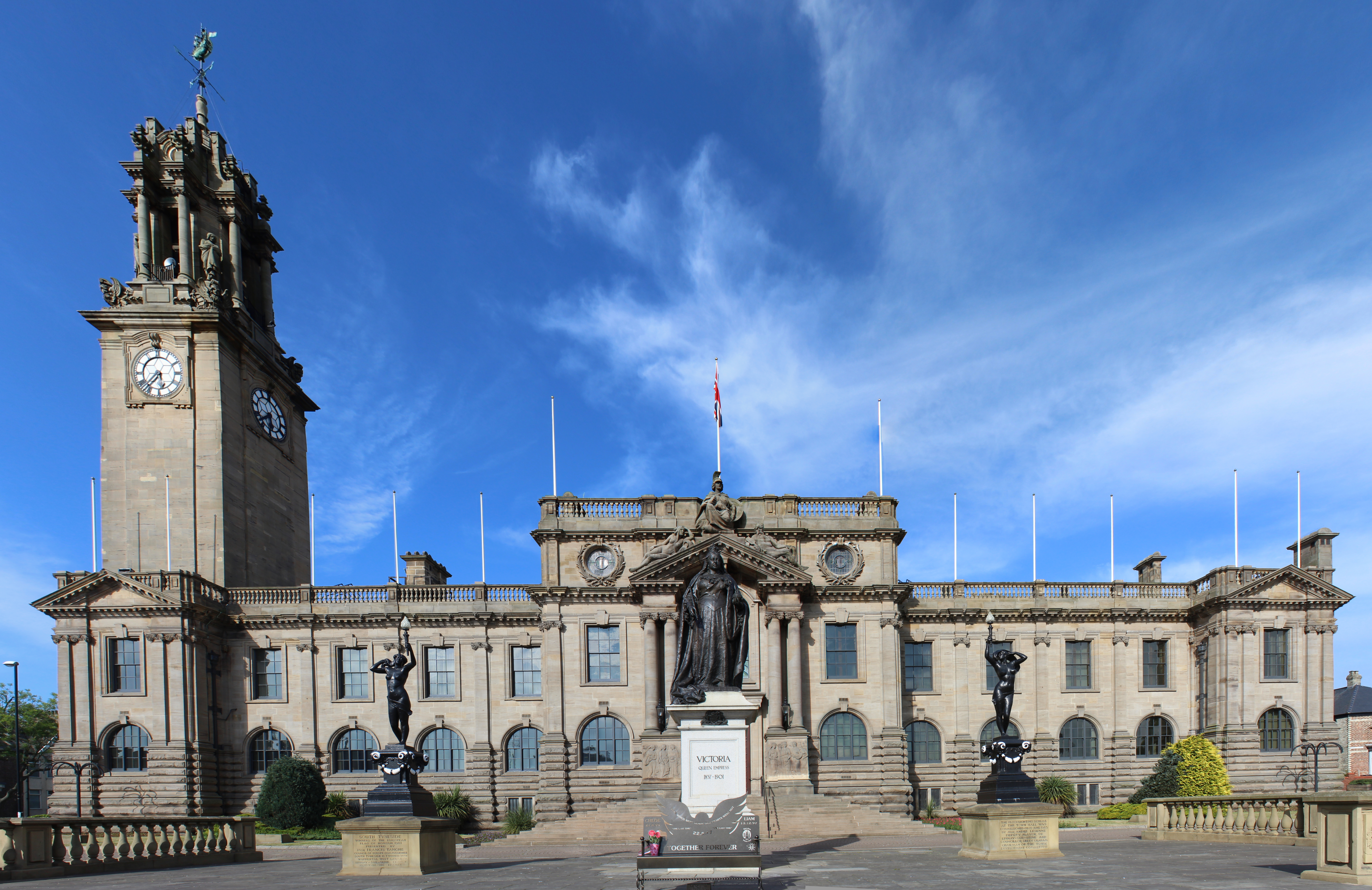
South Shields Town Hall, headquarters of South Tyneside Council

South Tyneside Council is formed of 54 members. As of June 2024 this consists of 28 Labour councillors, 11 Green councillors and 15 independent councillors. Jonathan Tew has been chief executive of the authority since 2021.

South Tyneside is represented by two MPs in two constituencies:

- South Shields, including Whitburn
- Jarrow and Gateshead East, which also serves Hebburn, the urban fringe villages and the eastern parts of Gateshead.

== Economy ==
Shipbuilding and repairing, coal mining and exports, and the chemical industries declined from the latter half of the 20th century, resulting in mass unemployment. In more recent years, however, this trend has reversed and South Tyneside attracts new industries, most notably in the service sector. There is still a considerable manufacturing base of ship-repair and offshore services, engineering, electronics, clothing, furniture, paper products, timber and small precision engineering.

At one time, Tyneside built 25% of the world's ships. South Tyneside College specialises in maritime training and attracts students from around the world.

Tourism is also an important and growing industry.

== Places of interest ==
South Shields town centre and riverside are undergoing significant regeneration, with new housing, business, retail and leisure uses replacing old industrial sites. The town centre offers high street shopping, a regular market by the Grade I listed old town hall, a new library and exhibition space called The Word, the head post office, museum and art gallery, a new bus/Metro interchange opened in 2019, cross-river pedestrian ferry to North Shields, Harton Quays office development and promenade, the town hall and civic offices. The Customs House is located within the historic Mill Dam conservation area and hosts a theatre, cinema, art gallery and restaurant.

Arbeia formed the easternmost extremity of the Roman Empire at Hadrian's Wall and is located at the mouth of the River Tyne on the North Sea coast. Excavations, a reconstructed fort and museum are open to the public on the historic Lawe Top site (Old English: hill top).

On the coast road to Whitburn is Marsden Rock, an impressive limestone sea stack colonised by sea birds and a longstanding tourist attraction. Further down the coast is Souter Lighthouse, the first in the world to be powered by electric current. Much of the coastal scenery in this area was, until two decades ago, dominated by the spoil heaps and pit head winding gear of Westoe and Whitburn collieries, but these are now gone and the area's natural environment has been restored.

Jarrow is home to St. Paul's Monastery, Bede's World museum, Jarrow Hall, the Viking Shopping Centre and the J. Barbour and Sons headquarters and factory outlet.

Hebburn riverside has open views of the renewable and offshore-related industries across-river at Wallsend. The town centre has undergone redevelopment with new residential building and civic and leisure facilities.

The suburban villages of Cleadon, East and West Boldon, Harton, Monkton, Westoe and Whitburn have traditional pubs, historic buildings and independent boutiques. There is an athletics track at Monkton and cricket grounds at Westoe and Whitburn.

== Environment ==
The physical environment of South Tyneside varies greatly in a small area; features include:

- the riverside towns of South Shields, Jarrow and Hebburn
- the urban fringe villages of Boldon, Cleadon and Whitburn
- established industrial areas at the Port of Tyne and Tyne Dock riverside
- new business parks at Monkton, St Hilda's and Boldon
- the highest point at Cleadon Hills
- the River Don estuary at St Paul's and Bede's World
- traditional Victorian terraces and Edwardian mansions
- typical inter- and post-war suburban housing
- the remains and reconstructed gatehouse of Arbeia Roman Fort
- the River Tyne
- the expanse of Shields Harbour at Littlehaven
- the coastline of The Leas and the sandy beaches, bays and limestone cliffs at Marsden Bay and Whitburn
- the traditional seaside parks, amusements and funfair at South Shields seafront
- Marsden Quarry
- the Great North Forest.

The EcoCentre at Hebburn is a building constructed from recycled materials, self-reliant in power generation by means of its own wind turbine and is efficient in waste management. There is also a local authority-managed wind turbine at Middlefields.

== Climate ==
Climate in this area has mild differences between highs and lows, and there is adequate rainfall year-round. The Köppen Climate Classification subtype for this climate is "Cfb" (Marine West Coast Climate/Oceanic climate).

Climate data for South Tyneside, UK
Month	Jan	Feb	Mar	Apr	May	Jun	Jul	Aug	Sep	Oct	Nov	Dec	Year
Mean daily maximum °C (°F)	7 (45)	8 (46)	9 (48)	10 (50)	13 (55)	15 (59)	18 (64)	18 (64)	16 (61)	13 (55)	9 (48)	7 (45)	12 (54)
Mean daily minimum °C (°F)	3 (37)	3 (37)	4 (39)	5 (41)	8 (46)	10 (50)	13 (55)	13 (55)	10 (50)	8 (46)	5 (41)	3 (37)	7 (45)
Average precipitation mm (inches)	33 (1.3)	33 (1.3)	30 (1.2)	43 (1.7)	48 (1.9)	43 (1.7)	38 (1.5)	48 (1.9)	48 (1.9)	53 (2.1)	53 (2.1)	51 (2)	520 (20.6)
Average precipitation days	13	13	15	15	12	14	11	11	13	15	15	15	162
Source: Weatherbase

The weather in South Tyneside as with the rest of the North East region is variable and typical of a Maritime Climate.

In 2019, South Tyneside Council declared a Climate Emergency. The motion was proposed by Green Party councillor David Francis and was amended by Labour; the amendment was successful and South Tyneside Council is expected to reach net-zero by 2030.

== Transport ==
The Tyne & Wear Metro is a light rail system connecting the area with the rest of the Tyne & Wear conurbation, including Sunderland, Gateshead, Newcastle Central, Newcastle Airport and Tynemouth. Nexus operates services on the Yellow and Green lines.

The A194(M) and A19 link South Tyneside to the national road network.

The Tyne Road and Pedestrian Tunnels traverse the river between Jarrow and Howdon. The pedestrian Shields Ferry also serves the towns of North and South Shields.

The Port of Tyne, situated at Tyne Dock, is a growing terminal handling large volumes of freight, including exports from the Nissan car plant in Washington.

== Sport ==
The Great North Run is the world's biggest half marathon and takes place every September/October, starting in Newcastle and finishing on The Leas at South Shields.

== Sister cities ==
South Tyneside is twinned with:

- Épinay-sur-Seine, France
- Noisy-le-Sec, France
- Wuppertal, Germany.

== People ==
Well-known South Tynesiders include author Dame Catherine Cookson, former three times Prime Minister of New Zealand Sir William Fox, actress Dame Flora Robson, Monty Python actor Eric Idle, Hollywood director Ridley Scott, waxed jacket inventor J Barbour and athlete Steve Cram.

Author Lewis Carroll was inspired to write Alice's Adventures in Wonderland and Through the Looking-Glass by local residents that he met when staying in Whitburn.

Singer Joe McElderry, who won the 2009 X Factor competition, comes from South Tyneside; two members of the 2011 winners Little Mix, Jade Thirlwall and Perrie Edwards, also hail from the area.

== Freedom of the Borough ==
The following people and military units have received the Freedom of the Borough of South Tyneside.

=== Individuals ===
- Raymond "Ray" Spencer: 21 October 2022.
- Sheila Graber: 26 July 2023.
- Jade Thirlwall: 28 December 2025.

=== Military units ===
- HMS Euryalus, RN: 1981.
- 205 (3rd Durham Volunteer Artillery) Battery Royal Artillery: 2007.
- South Shields Volunteer Life Brigade: 11 May 2017.
