= Rosemary Cramp =

British archaeologist (1929–2023)

Professor Dame Rosemary Cramp DBE FSA FBA
- Born: Rosemary Jean Cramp; 6 May 1929; Cranoe, Leicestershire, England
- Died: 27 April 2023 (aged 93); Durham, England
- Title: Professor of Archaeology

Academic background
- Education: Market Harborough Grammar School
- Alma mater: St Anne's College, Oxford (BLitt MA)

Academic work
- Discipline: Archaeology and medieval studies
- Sub-discipline: Anglo-Saxons; Archaeology of northern England; Early medieval sculpture and glass; Early monasticism
- Institutions: St Anne's College, Oxford; Durham University

Dame Rosemary Jean Cramp (6 May 1929 – 27 April 2023) was a British archaeologist and academic specialising in the Anglo-Saxons. She was the first female professor appointed at Durham University and was Professor of Archaeology from 1971 to 1990. She served as president of the Society of Antiquaries of London from 2001 to 2004.

== Early life and education ==
Rosemary Jean Cramp was born on 6 May 1929 in Cranoe, Leicestershire, England. She grew up on her father's farm in Leicestershire and was educated at Market Harborough Grammar, a grammar school in Market Harborough, Leicestershire. At age 12, she found evidence of a Roman villa on her family land at Glooston. She said she always felt she was meant to be an archaeologist, wanting a detective kit for her seventh birthday.

Cramp went on to study English language and literature at St Anne's College, Oxford, where her tutor was Iris Murdoch. During her degree, having come to the attention of archaeologist Margerie Venables Taylor, she attended the archaeological field school held at Corbridge, Northumberland, and was an active member of the Oxford University Archaeological Society. She graduated with a Bachelor of Arts (BA) degree; as per tradition, her BA was later promoted to Master of Arts (MA Oxon). She remained at St Anne's to study for a postgraduate Bachelor of Letters (BLitt) degree under Christopher Hawkes, which she completed in 1950. Her thesis concerned the relevance of archaeological evidence in relation to Old English poetry, and was titled "Some aspects of Old English vocabulary in the light of recent archaeological evidence".

== Academic career ==
Cramp began her academic career at her alma mater, the University of Oxford, where she was a fellow and tutor of English, with a specialism in Anglo-Saxon, at St Anne's College from 1950 to 1955.

In 1955, a job appeared at Durham University for a lecturer who could teach history, English, and archaeology; Cramp "applied rather half-heartedly, got it, and a bit reluctantly came north". She also became a member of St Mary's College. The following year she, along with fellow-archaeologist Eric Birley, formally founded the new Department of Archaeology. Cramp, who specialised in Roman and Anglo-Saxon archaeology, was promoted to senior lecturer in 1966, and in 1971 became the first female professor at Durham when she was appointed Professor of Archaeology. She was head of the Department of Archaeology from 1971 until her retirement in 1990, when she was appointed professor emerita. On her retirement, The Rosemary Cramp Fund was established by Durham's Department of Archaeology to recognise individuals and groups who make a significant contribution to the archaeology and heritage of Britain and Ireland.

In 1992, she was a visiting fellow at All Souls College, Oxford.

Outside of her university work, Cramp held a number of voluntary positions. From 1975 to 1999, she served as a member of the Royal Commission on the Ancient and Historical Monuments of Scotland. She was a trustee of the British Museum between 1978 and 1998, and a member of the Historic Buildings and Monuments Commission for England (now known as Historic England) from 1984 to 1989. She served as Chairwoman of the Archaeology Data Service from 1996 to 2001.

Cramp held a number of senior appointments within academic organizations. She was president of the Council for British Archaeology (1989-1992), and honorary vice-president thereafter. She was also president of the Society for Church Archaeology (1996-2000), vice-president of the Royal Archaeological Institute (1992-1997), and president of the Society of Antiquaries of London from 2001 to 2004.

Cramp was a panellist in a 1958 episode of the gameshow Animal, Vegetable, Mineral? held at the Museum of Gloucester, and was an expert guest on a 2007 episode of In Our Time on the life of St. Hilda.

=== Excavations at Monkwearmouth–Jarrow ===
From 1963 to 1978, Cramp excavated at Monkwearmouth–Jarrow Abbey, Northumbria, leading the team which discovered remains of the seventh and eighth-century buildings. A final excavation occurred in 1984.

Prior to the excavations, little was known of the physical buildings beyond Bede's written references. During excavations, some of the earliest stained glass in Britain were discovered; the glass also comprises the largest collection of seventh and eighth-century stained glass in Western Europe. Reflecting on the excavation, Cramp described the moment, saying that the shards of glass "looked like jewels lying on the ground." Cramp's excavations also revealed the later communities on the site, dating from the 11th to the 16th centuries.

The excavation reports were published in 2005 and 2006 through English Heritage. In 2012, a bid to secure the site World Heritage status was launched, but the application was later suspended. The bid described the importance of the site, noting "its direct association with Bede, Biscop and Bede's teacher Ceolfrith makes it one of the most influential monastic sites in Europe."

Cramp's Jarrow excavations led to the development of a museum and education programme, which eventually became Bede’s World. It featured an Anglo-Saxon farm with rare-breed animals, and is now known as Jarrow Hall and Bede Museum.

=== Corpus of Anglo-Saxon Stone Sculpture ===
At the same time as her excavations at Monkwearmouth-Jarrow, Cramp was helping to develop the Corpus of Anglo-Saxon Stone Sculpture, which was launched in 1977. This is the first comprehensive catalogue of early medieval English stone sculpture (from the 7th-11th centuries). At the time of her death, it had reached 13 published volumes covering 32 English counties and including more than 3,500 sculptures. Volume I is devoted to Northumberland and County Durham and there are 16 volumes in total planned.

== Death ==
Dame Rosemary Cramp died in Durham, England, on 27 April 2023, at the age of 93. Her funeral was held at St Cuthbert's Church, Durham on 19 May 2023, with an additional memorial service held at Durham Cathedral on 14 July 2023.

== Honours ==
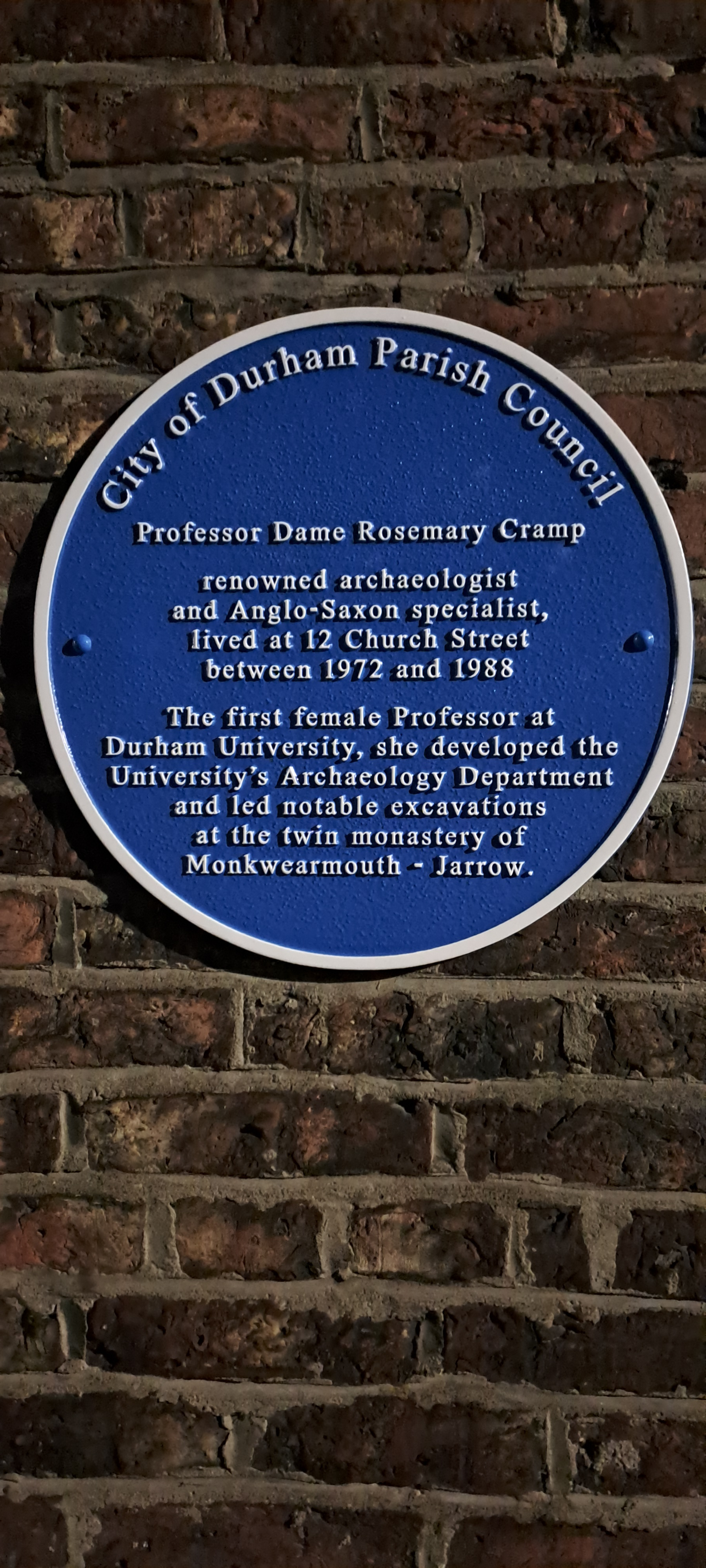
Blue plaque commemorating Professor Dame Rosemary Cramp

On 8 January 1959, Cramp was elected Fellow of the Society of Antiquaries of London (FSA) and served as President from 2001 to 2004. In 2006, she was elected Fellow of the British Academy (FBA). In 2008, she was awarded the Gold Medal of the Society of Antiquaries of London; it is awarded "for distinguished services to archaeology".

Dame Iris Murdoch dedicated her 1978 novel The Sea, The Sea to Cramp.

In 1987, Cramp was appointed a Commander of the Order of the British Empire (CBE). In the 2011 Queen's Birthday Honours, she was promoted to Dame Commander of the Order of the British Empire (DBE) 'for services to scholarship'.

Cramp was awarded a number of honorary degrees. She was awarded Honorary Doctor of Science degrees by Durham University in 1995, by the University of Bradford in July 2002, and the University of Cambridge in 2019. She was awarded Honorary Doctor of Letters degrees by University College Cork in June 2003 and the University of Leicester in 2004.

A Festschrift was published in Cramp's honour in 2001. It was titled Image and Power in the Archaeology of Early Medieval Britain: Essays in Honour of Rosemary Cramp, and was edited by Helena Hamerow and Arthur MacGregor. Contributors included Nancy Edwards and Martin Carver. A second honorary volume was published in 2008; edited by Catherine Karkov and Helen Damico, Æedificia nova: Studies in Honour of Rosemary Cramp focused on the art, archaeology and literature of Anglo-Saxon England, and included an article by Cramp.

Two blue plaques honouring her were unveiled in 2024, one located at Jarrow Hall; the other, at the house she lived in on Church Street, in Durham, from 1972-1988.

== Selected works ==
- Cramp, Rosemary J. (1957). "Beowulf and Archaeology" (PDF). Medieval Archaeology. 1. Society for Medieval Archaeology: 57–77. doi:10.1080/00766097.1957.11735382.
- Cramp, R. J.; Lang, J. T. (1977). A Century of Anglo-Saxon Sculpture. Newcastle upon Tyne: Frank Graham. ISBN 978-0859830997.
- Cramp, Rosemary (1984). Corpus of Anglo-Saxon stone sculpture in England: Volume I, County Durham and Northumberland. Oxford: Oxford University Press. ISBN 0-19-726012-8.
- Cramp, Rosemary (1984). Corpus of Anglo-Saxon Stone Sculpture: General Introduction. Oxford: Oxford University Press. ISBN 0-85672-478-5.
- Cramp, Rosemary (1986). "Anglo-Saxon and Italian Sculpture". Angli e Sassoni al di qua e al di là del mare: 26 aprile-lo maggio 1984. Settimane di studio del Centro italiano di studi sull'alto Medioevo. Vol. XXXII. Spoleto: Centro italiano di studi sull'alto Medioevo. pp. 125–140.
- Bailey, Richard N.; Cramp, Rosemary (1988). Corpus of Anglo-Saxon stone sculpture in England: Volume II, Cumberland, Westmorland and Lancashire North-of-the-Sands. Oxford: Oxford University Press. ISBN 0-19-726036-5.
- Cramp, Rosemary (1991). Grammar of Anglo-Saxon Ornament: A General Introduction to the Corpus of Anglo-Saxon Stone Sculpture. Oxford: Oxford University Press. ISBN 0-19-726098-5.
- Cramp, Rosemary (1992). Studies in Anglo-Saxon sculpture. London: Pindar Press. ISBN 978-0907132615.
- Cramp, Rosemary (23 March 1994). "Obituary: Rupert Bruce-Mitford". The Independent.
- Cramp, R. (2005). Wearmouth and Jarrow Monastic Sites, Volume 1. English Heritage. doi:10.5284/1028203. ISBN 978-1848022188.
- Cramp, R. (2006). Wearmouth and Jarrow Monastic Sites, Volume 2. English Heritage. doi:10.5284/1028203. ISBN 978-1848022195.
- Cramp, Rosemary (2005). Corpus of Anglo-Saxon stone sculpture in England: Volume VII, South-West England. Oxford: Oxford University Press. ISBN 978-0-19-726334-1.
- Cramp, Rosemary (2014). The Hirsel Excavations. Society for Medieval Archaeology. ISBN 978-1909662353.
