= Tyneside Cinema =

Independent cinema in Newcastle upon Tyne, England

Coordinates: 54°58′25″N 1°36′43″W

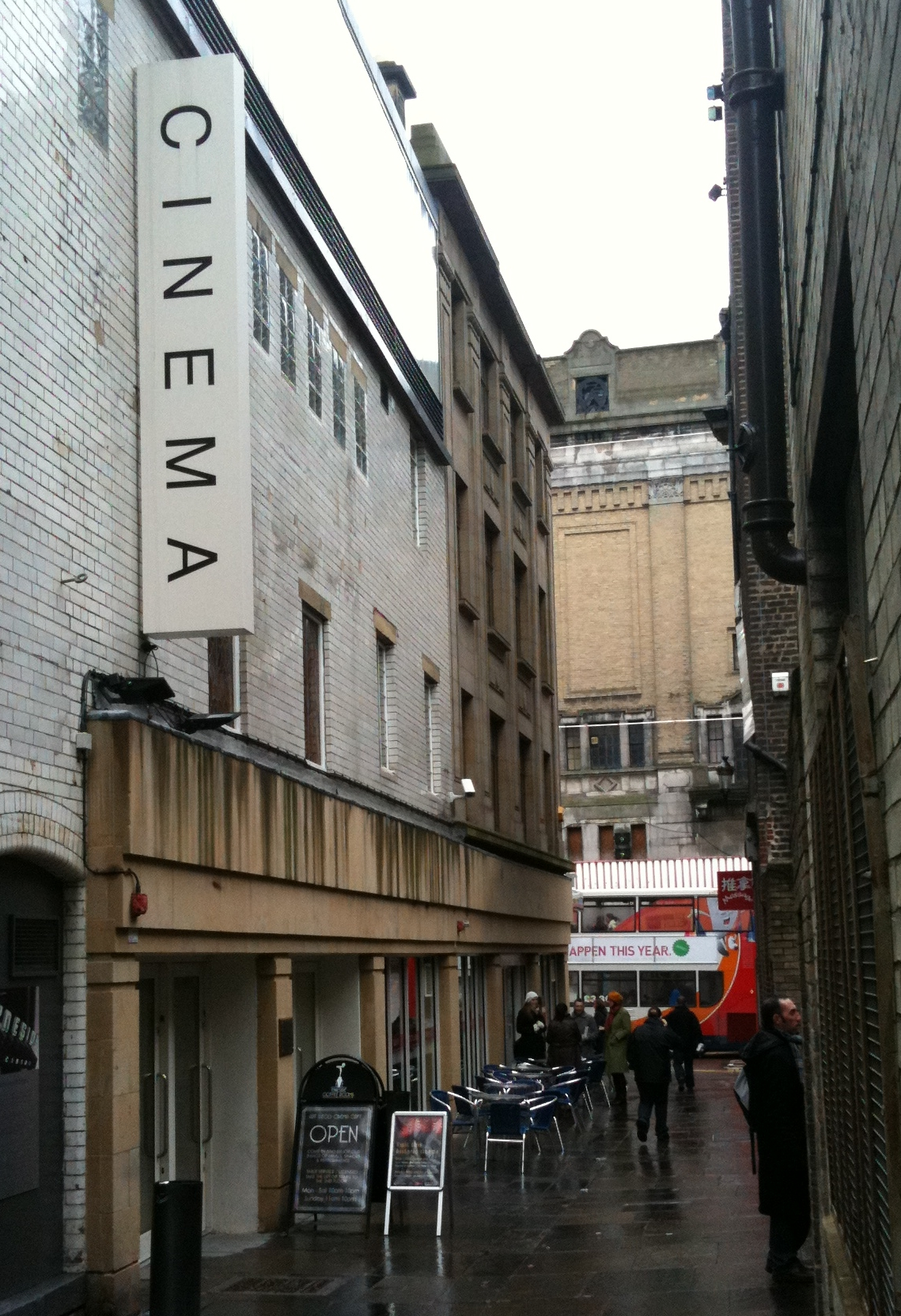
- The entrance of the Tyneside Cinema, looking towards Pilgrim Street. (2010)
- Interactive map of Tyneside Cinema
- Former names: News Theatre; Tyneside Film Theatre
- Address: Pilgrim Street, Newcastle upon Tyne; United Kingdom
- Type: Cinema

Construction
- Opened: 1 February 1937; 89 years ago
- Renovated: May 2008

Website
- Official website

The Tyneside Cinema is an independent cinema in Newcastle upon Tyne. It is the city's only full-time independent cultural cinema, specialising in the screening of independent and world cinema from across the globe. The last remaining newsreel theatre to be in full-time operation in the UK, it is a Grade II listed building. The Tyneside's patrons are filmmakers Mike Figgis and Mike Hodges, and musicians Neil Tennant of the Pet Shop Boys and Paul Smith of Maxïmo Park. Its cultural remit is set by the trustees and is a requisite for continued funding from sponsors such as the BFI and the Arts Council.

Alongside its core programme of cultural cinema, the newly refurbished Tyneside Cinema holds daily free screenings of archive newsreel footage and guided tours. The cinema also allows budding producers and digital artists to network and present their work. A £7m restoration and renovation project occurred between 2006 and 2008, and the venue now boasts digital projection and 3D facilities alongside traditional film projection.

In 2025, supported by New Writing North and the North East Mayoral Strategic Authority, the cinema began employing a yearly screenwriter-in-residence.

== History ==
The Tyneside building was conceived, designed and built by Dixon Scott, a local entrepreneur and the Great Uncle of film directors Sir Ridley and Tony Scott. Scott had travelled in the Middle and Far East, and his experiences influenced the décor of the first floor landing and foyer of the Tyneside building. Scott decorated the building with his own take on Art Deco, as influenced by his Eastern travels.

The Tyneside Cinema was opened as a news cinema, the Bijou News-Reel Cinema on 1 February 1937, and was commonly known as the News Theatre. Screenings would include a mixture of travel, sport, and news films, as well as cartoons.

In 1937, the cinema became the home of the Tyneside Film Society, the origin of the Tyneside Cinema itself which, by the late 1950s, had grown into the largest film society in the UK outside London. The popularity of television led to a decline in audiences and consequently the cinema was closed in 1968. After a brief period, it was reopened as a film theatre by the BFI. The cinema closed again in 1975. A case for re-opening the cinema, then known as the Tyneside Film Theatre, was put together by the Tyneside Filmgoers Group and it was re‐opened in 1976.

== Restoration and reopening ==
The cinema had occupied its Pilgrim Street site since 1937, and had by 1999 declined to a critical state, with many believing it would eventually be forced to close. The cinema required a number of improvements, and despite its history and prime location, the cinema had a serious financial deficit. A significant investment in the structure was required, and following a survey of the building, the cinema's board of trustees realised that a capital investment of about £7m would be necessary. The project secured the support of organisations including One North East and the Northern Rock Foundation Seats removed from the Classic screen were sold in 2006, raising more than £5000 for the restoration project. The stated aim of the project was to celebrate the cinema's heritage as a newsreel theatre and also look to its future in the digital age.

The £7m restoration and renovation project was undertaken between November 2006 and May 2008. Original features inside the building had to be protected during the project, and the work uncovered a pair of original stained glass windows and mosaic floor tiling which had been hidden for years. Expanding the cinema in its town centre location was difficult due to the limited space available. Building works proceeded upwards, and the area between the cinema and its neighbouring building was also used.

The cinema obtained a temporary lease at Gateshead's Old Town Hall, which allowed the cinema to screen films in a single theatre under the Tyneside Cinema brand. Themed screenings were held across Newcastle to allow the public access to the Tyneside Cinema experience as work on the restoration project continued. These included a screening of It's a Wonderful Life at the Discovery Museum with mulled wine and mince pies for attendees, and a screening of Monty Python's Life of Brian at St. Mary's Church.

The Tyneside reopened in May 2008, following the major restoration of its original auditorium, alongside a modern extension and redevelopment of the upper floors designed by Fletcher Priest Architects and consulting engineers Cundall. The work added a new level to the building with two new screens, the Roxy and the Electra, housed on top of each other. A single projection block behind serves all of the cinema's screens. The increase in screens enabled more flexibility to respond to demand and created space to move films around. A new bar, and a film learning centre called the Tyneside Studio, partly designed by filmmaker Mike Figgis, were also installed.

Following the redevelopment, the site's Venue Manager was Leigh Venus, who went on to re-open the former Bede's World heritage site as Jarrow Hall in 2016. In 2014 the cinema was further expanded by the addition of the Tyneside Bar Café in an adjoining premise which had previously been occupied by a bank. The site also included a new purpose built dual space ('The Gallery'), functioning as a Gallery for artists' moving image during the day and as a Cinema in the evening. The Gallery, curated by Elisabetta Fabrizi and funded by ACE, commissioned and showcased projects by both established and emerging artists including John Akomfrah, Aura Satz, Phil Collins, Rachel Reupke, Ursula Mayer, John Smith and Oreet Ashery.

In March 2020, the cinema announced that it would be closing indefinitely due to the COVID-19 pandemic. The cinema started a donation campaign to offset their financial losses, but CEO Holli Keeble said it was at risk of permanent closure. In June 2020, the cinema began redundancy consultations for its entire workforce. In June 2024 the cinema received a loan of £700,000 from the North East Social Investment Fund, helping to secure the immediate future of the cinema.

== Controversies ==
In November 2019, following an employment tribunal, Tyneside Cinema was found to have discriminated against a former employee who lived with mental health disabilities, and had not made reasonable adjustments to protect them. Following a remedy hearing in January 2020, in accordance with the Equality Act 2010, they were ordered to pay compensation to the employee.

In June 2020, allegations of sexual assault, bullying and harassment emerged on social media. In response, CEO Holli Keeble and chair of the board Lucy Armstrong issued a statement saying that they took "the safety and well-being of our team at Tyneside Cinema very seriously, and strive to cultivate a culture of equality and inclusivity in the workplace". Following this, over 200 current and former employees issued a counter-statement condemning the official response, stating:

We feel strongly that existing training policies, grievance procedures and mechanisms for whistle-blowing are not fit for purpose. We take this view based on substantial anecdotal evidence from colleagues and former colleagues. We do not feel that Tyneside Cinema is a safe workplace for everyone.

Following this, the board of trustees announced that a review by a "high-level independent consultant", later named as Turning Moment, would take place. The cinema also reported itself to the Charity Commission.

It was reported on September 6 that another former employee, who complained to the Cinema that she was raped by a former employee, would be taking the cinema to an employment tribunal. The report stated that Northumbria Police had interviewed a man in relation to the alleged incident, but released him without any further action taken.

On September 24, a joint statement issued by the cinema online announced the resignations of both Keeble and Armstrong. In the statement, Armstrong said: "We both recognise that in order to give the Tyneside Cinema the best opportunity for future success it is right that we both move aside and allow a new team to take over."

On October 19, the board of trustees at Tyneside Cinema received the 297-page report from Turning Moment into the allegations. A 15-page executive summary was made public on October 21, which described the review team's overall conclusions regarding the culture at the Cinema:

- Sexual harassment has persisted over many years and has not been properly addressed.
- Bullying and a lack of respect were endured, sometimes daily and for long periods of time.
- Some staff have lost trust and faith in the higher leadership.
- Staff have been exposed to unnecessary safety risks in the course of their work.
- Because of the combination of factors highlighted, staff have suffered pressure and stress.
- Some staff and managers have not experienced any issues or difficulties compared to others.

On October 22, the board of trustees issued their own statement in response, in which they accepted "all the findings and conclusions" in the report:

First and foremost, we apologise profusely to anyone affected currently or previously by the culture and behaviours that have been identified as being systemic at the Cinema over the last seven years. The report makes clear how difficult some of the 100 participants found the experience, and we thank them for their courage in coming forward and bringing the issues to light. No one should work at or visit an organisation where they are either unsafe or feel unsafe.

== Awards ==
The Tyneside Cinema won the Building Conservation and Tourism and Leisure categories as well as the overall accolade Project of the Year at the 2009 Royal Institution of Chartered Surveyors North East Renaissance Awards at Newcastle Civic Centre on 25 April 2009. Judges described the Tyneside Cinema restoration as “an excellent example of a building conservation project”, calling the cinema “a successful commercial venture that has employed creative and innovative design to breathe new life into a leisure facility that is rare and in many ways unique, a project that is playing a regenerative role in the widest sense of the word”.
