= Jarrow Hall (museum) =

Museum in Jarrow, England

Coordinates: 54°58′57″N 1°28′26″W

- Established: 1993
- Location: Jarrow, South Tyneside, England

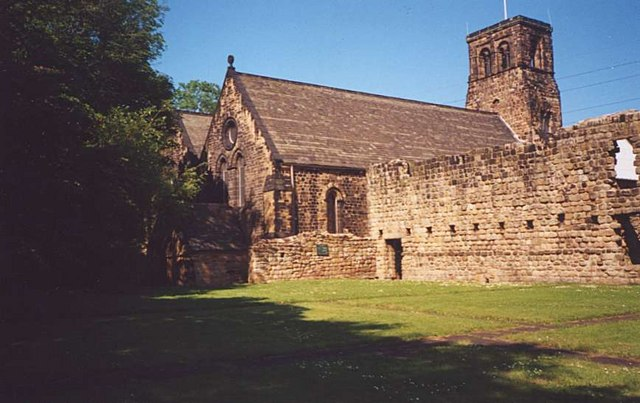
St Paul's Monastery

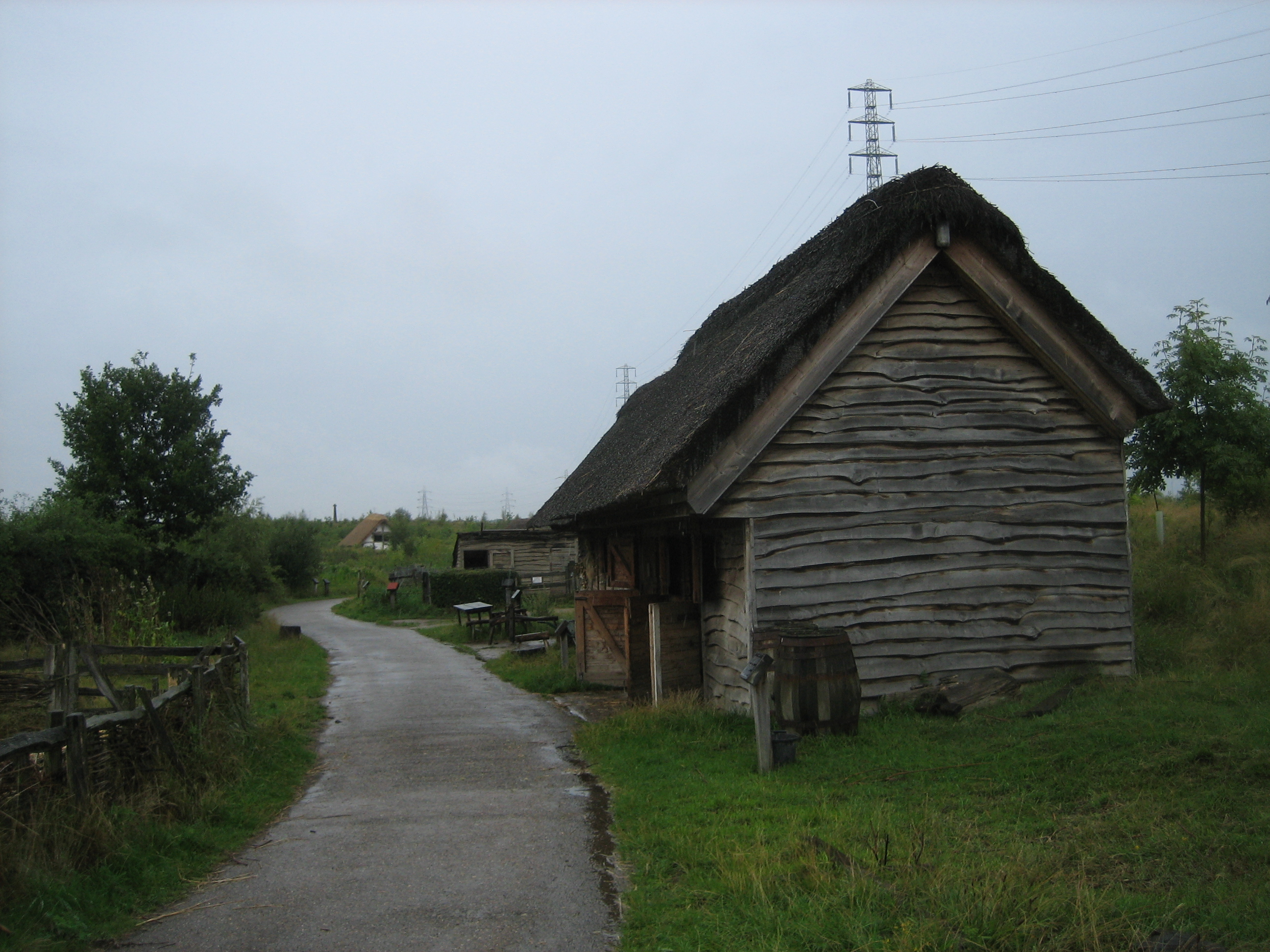
The reconstructed Anglo-Saxon farm

Jarrow Hall (formerly Bede's World) is a museum in Jarrow, South Tyneside, England which celebrates the life of Bede; a monk, author and scholar who lived in at the Abbey Church of Saint Peter and Saint Paul, Wearmouth-Jarrow, a double monastery at Jarrow and Monkwearmouth, (today part of Sunderland), England.

The site features a museum dedicated to the life and times of the famous monk, with other features and attractions – including a reconstructed Anglo-Saxon farm and the 18th-century Georgian building Jarrow Hall house itself – reflected in a calendar of activities, including special themed events, an educational programme for schools and heritage skills workshops, alongside space for businesses and events.

== History ==
The Anglo-Saxon attraction Bede's World opened on an 11-acre site in Jarrow in 1993 at a cost of almost £10 million, and was run by the Bede's World Charitable Trust, with grant support from the local council. Although the complex attracted 70,000 visitors a year, it became no longer financially viable and ceased operation in February 2016.

The writer and broadcaster Melvyn Bragg was critical of its closure, and in an item on BBC Radio 4's Broadcasting House in 2016, he contrasted the museum's plight to the large funding made available to the Garden Bridge project in London, which was eventually cancelled.

== Reopening and relaunch ==
It was announced in August 2016 that the former Bede's World site would re-open as 'Jarrow Hall Anglo-Saxon Farm, Village and Bede Museum', to be managed by the charity Groundwork's South Tyneside and Newcastle trust.

Following over £100,000 of investment by Groundwork and a soft-open in October 2016, the site fully launched on 8 April 2017, hosting activities for all ages including farm talks, live re-enactment combat, authentic Anglo-Saxon craft and lectures, as well as the reconstructed historical dwellings being renovated by authentically attired workers using traditional wattle and daub building techniques. The interior of Jarrow Hall House was also renovated with Georgian-era expertise provided by Durham University, and hosts a new coffee shop, Hive Coffee Company. The direction and development of the site during the relaunch period were led by Leigh Venus, former Venue Manager of Newcastle upon Tyne's historic Tyneside Cinema.

== Current features ==
The Bede Museum building features an "Age of Bede" exhibit, which includes excavated artefacts from the historic monastery such as stained glass, imported pottery, coins and stone carvings, and exhibits about Anglo-Saxon culture, Bede's life and works, the life of a monk, and the medieval Kingdom of Northumbria.

There is a working reconstructed Anglo-Saxon farm called Gyrwe (pronounced "Yeerweh") after the Old English name for Jarrow, showing animal husbandry with full-size reconstructions of three timber buildings from Northumbria based on the evidence of archaeological work. Thirlings Hall was the largest, with animal hide and other objects. A wood-burning fire in the form of a small pit/designated area is used throughout the year, and allows for a great smell to filter through the building. The two other buildings, smaller in size, are a grubenhaus – a sunken building used as a cold store – and a monk's cell. All buildings are thatched and were built using traditional techniques.

The farm animals are of similar breeds to animals that would have been present circa 1300 years ago, to simulate the types of animals which would have been seen in Anglo-Saxon England; cattle are smaller and sheep more varied, before selective breeding methods were introduced. Ancient strains of wheat and vegetables, such as those the monks might have eaten, used to be selectively grown on site.

Visitors are able to tour the ruins of the Anglo-Saxon monastery of St Paul, which has been designated a scheduled monument.

The site also features a coffee shop located in Jarrow Hall House, an 18th-century Georgian property adjacent to the Bede Museum. The house was renovated in 2017. The Medieval herb garden at the rear of Jarrow Hall House features over 200 species of herbs, and there is a gift shop within the Bede Museum. The site also house events and conference facilities, both within Jarrow Hall House and the Bede Museum building.
