= Jarrow March =

1936 protest about unemployment in the north of England

Coordinates: 54°58′53″N 01°29′24″W

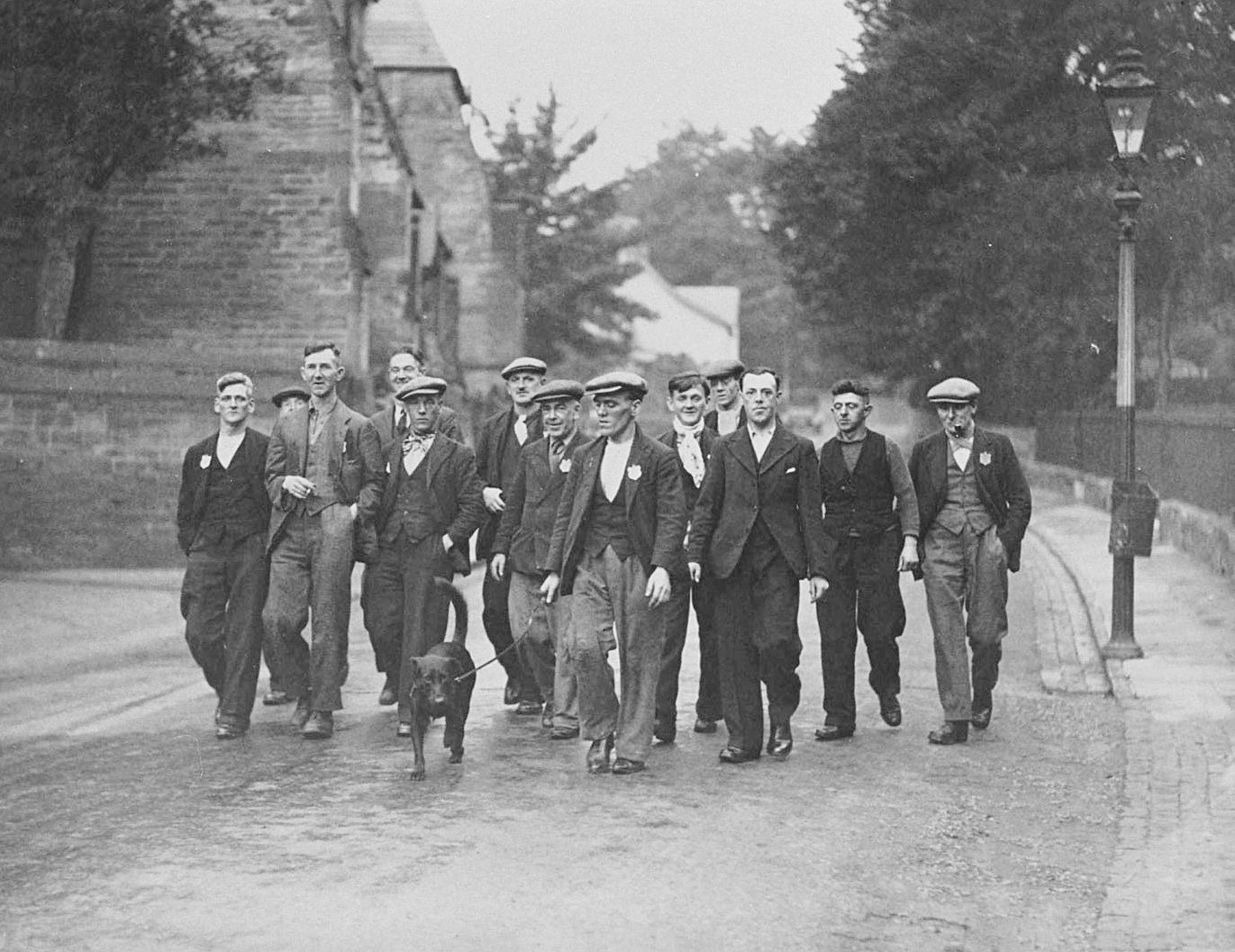
Jarrow marchers en route to London

The Jarrow March of 5–31 October 1936, also known as the Jarrow Crusade, (Note: Although the term "Jarrow Crusade" is widely used in Matt Perry's history of the march, he notes that Jarrovians usually refer to it as the "March".) was an organised protest against the unemployment and poverty suffered in the English town of Jarrow during the 1930s. Around 200 men, or "Crusaders" as they preferred to be called, marched from Jarrow to London, carrying a petition to the British government requesting the re-establishment of industry in the town following the closure in 1934 of its main employer, Palmer's shipyard. The petition was received by the House of Commons but not debated, and the march produced few immediate results. The Jarrovians went home believing that they had failed.

Jarrow had been a settlement since at least the 8th century. In the early 19th century, a coal industry developed before the shipyard was established in 1851. Over the following 80 years, more than 1,000 ships were launched in Jarrow. In the 1920s, a combination of mismanagement and changed world trade conditions following the First World War brought a decline that led eventually to the yard's closure. Plans to replace it with a modern steelworks plant were frustrated by opposition from the British Iron and Steel Federation, an employers' organisation with its own plans for the industry. The failure of the steelworks plan, and the lack of any prospect of large-scale employment in the town, were the final factors that led to the decision to march.

Marches of the unemployed to London, termed "hunger marches", had taken place since the early 1920s, mainly organised by the National Unemployed Workers' Movement (NUWM), a communist-led body. For fear of being associated with communist agitation, the Labour Party and Trades Union Congress (TUC) leaderships stood aloof from these marches. They exercised the same policy of detachment towards the Jarrow March, which was organised by the borough council with the support of all sections of the town but without any connection with the NUWM. During their journey the Jarrow marchers received sustenance and hospitality from local branches of all the main political parties, and were given a broad public welcome on their arrival in London.

Despite the initial sense of failure among the marchers, historians have subsequently recognized the Jarrow March as a defining event of the 1930s. It helped to foster the change in attitudes that prepared the way to social reforms after the Second World War, which their proponents thought would improve working conditions. The town holds numerous memorials to the march. Re-enactments celebrated the 50th and 75th anniversaries, in both cases invoking the "spirit of Jarrow" in their campaigns against unemployment. In contrast to the Labour Party's coldness in 1936, the post-war party leadership adopted the march as a metaphor for governmental callousness and working-class fortitude.

== National Background ==
=== Unemployment in Britain between the wars ===
Unemployment in Britain, 1923–36
Year	Total %	SE England %	NE England %	Ship- building %
1923	11.7	9.2	12.2	43.6
1924	10.3	7.5	10.9	30.3
1925	11.3	5.9	15.0	33.5
1926	12.5	5.4	17.2	39.5
1927	9.7	5.0	13.7	29.7
1928	10.8	5.4	15.1	24.5
1929	10.4	5.6	13.7	25.3
1930	16.1	8.0	20.2	27.6
1931	21.3	12.0	27.4	51.9
1932	22.1	14.3	28.5	62.0
1933	19.9	11.5	26.0	61.7
1934	16.7	8.7	22.1	51.2
1935	15.5	8.1	20.7	44.4
1936	13.1	7.3	16.8	33.3

In the period immediately after the end of the First World War, Britain's economy enjoyed a brief boom. Businesses rushed to replenish stocks and re-establish peacetime conditions of trade and, while prices rose rapidly, wages rose faster and unemployment was negligible. By April 1920 this boom had given way to Britain's first post-war slump, which ushered in an era of high unemployment. Britain's adoption of generally deflationary economic policies, including a return to the gold standard in 1925, helped to ensure that the percentage of the workforce without jobs remained at around 10% for the rest of the 1920s and beyond, well above the normal pre-war levels. During the world recession that began in 1929 and lasted until 1932, the percentage of unemployed peaked at 22%, representing more than 3 million workers.

Unemployment was particularly heavy in Britain's traditional staple export industries—coal mining, shipbuilding, iron and steel and textiles—all of which were in a slow decline from their Victorian heyday. Because of the concentration of these industries in the north of England, in Scotland and in Wales, the percentage of unemployed persons in these regions was significantly higher, sometimes more than double, than in the south throughout the interwar period. The decline of these industries helped to create pockets of long-term unemployment outside the normal cyclical variations. Some workers had no work for years.

=== Hunger marches ===
In 1921, in reaction to the rising levels of unemployment, the newly formed British Communist Party set up the National Unemployed Workers' Movement (NUWM). From 1922 until the late 1930s, under its charismatic leader Wal Hannington, the NUWM organised regular marches in which unemployed workers converged on London to confront Parliament, in the belief that this would improve conditions. These became known as "hunger marches", reviving a name coined by the press in 1908, when a group of London's unemployed marched to Hyde Park.

The 1922 marchers sought a meeting with the new prime minister, Bonar Law, who refused to see them because of their undemocratic leadership. The march leaders were denounced in The Times as "avowed Communists ... who have been identified with disturbances in their own localities". The Labour Party and the TUC kept aloof, fearful of being tainted by association with the communist organisers. The same pattern was followed with subsequent NUWM marches; successive prime ministers—Stanley Baldwin in 1929, Ramsay MacDonald in 1930 and 1934—declined to meet the marchers' representatives, and the Labour Party and the TUC continued to keep their distance.

In 1931, MacDonald became head of a Conservative-dominated National Government that imposed a means test on unemployment benefits. Anger at the means test was the rationale for the 1932 hunger march, in which a series of rallies and demonstrations across London broke out into considerable violence; the leaders provoked clashes with opponents and police in Hyde Park, Trafalgar Square and Westminster, which led to the arrest and imprisonment of the march's leaders. Although women were not allowed to march on the Jarrow march, women's contingents were present at other hunger marches across the 1930s. These women, who were often the wives of unemployed men, were often faced with restrictions, such as being forced to stay in workhouses if the local Labour Party would not accommodate them.

Two additional national marches were held in 1934 and 1936. By this time the country had made a substantial recovery from the worst depression years of 1929–32. Unemployment was significantly down, annual growth was averaging 4%, and many parts of the country were enjoying a substantial boom in housing and consumer goods. The increasing prosperity was not uniformly spread, and there were sharp contrasts between economic conditions in the south, and those in the north-east, South Wales, Scotland and elsewhere, where the rate of recovery was much slower.

At the same time, the national mood was changing. External factors such as the rise of fascism in Europe helped to unify the British left, and there were more supportive voices in parliament on behalf of the unemployed. The idea of marching as a means of expressing political or social grievances had by now become an accepted and well-established tactic, and there was a growing awareness of the problems complained of, which counterbalanced their exploitation by the Communists. The historian A. J. P. Taylor considered that the hunger marchers had "displayed the failure of capitalism in a way that mere figures or literary description could not. Middle-class people felt the call of conscience".

== Local background: Jarrow ==
=== Town history ===
"[Jarrow] ... is well calculated to produce a general impression of solemn quiet. The church and mouldering monastic walls on the green hill, sloping to the bay, the long silvery expanse of water, the gentle ripple of the advancing tide ... Jarrow is 'a romancy spot'."

— Robert Surtees describing pre-industrial Jarrow, in his history of the County of Durham (1820).

Jarrow, situated on the River Tyne in County Durham, (Note: Jarrow was in County Durham prior to 1974) northern England, entered British history in the 8th century, as the home of Bede, the early Christian monk and scholar. After Bede, little changed in the remote rural community for a thousand years, although his monastery was dissolved under Henry VIII in the 16th century. The discovery of coal in the 17th century led to major changes. Mining on an industrial scale began in the early 1800s, resulting in the population of Jarrow more than doubling between 1801 and 1821 to around 3,500, largely from the influx of mineworkers.

The town's years as a coalfield were unhappy. Living conditions in many of the hastily erected cottages were insanitary, lacking water and drainage. There was a serious outbreak of cholera in Jarrow and northeast England in the winter of 1831–32, as part of an epidemic that spread from Europe and resulted in more than 200 deaths in Newcastle alone. Relations in Jarrow between employer and employee were poor; workers were held by the "bond" system whereby they were tied to a particular employer for a year, whether or not that employer could provide work.

Working conditions in the mines were dangerous: there were explosions in 1826, 1828 and 1845, each with large loss of life. Attempts by workers to organise into a trade union were fiercely opposed by the employers. Miners conducted lengthy strikes in 1832 and 1844, each ending when hunger forced them back to work. After the easier seams of coal were exhausted, the Jarrow pits became less profitable, and in 1851 the owners abandoned them altogether.

=== Shipbuilding ===
Charles Palmer, founder of Jarrow's shipyard

Jarrow began its development as a shipbuilding town with the establishment in 1851 of Palmer's shipyard on the banks of the River Tyne. The first ship from the yard was launched in 1852, an iron-built and steam-powered collier. Many more such carriers followed. In 1856 the yard began building warships, and was soon supplying many of the world's navies. With its associated iron and steel works, it became the largest shipbuilding centre in the country, employing thousands of men. Jarrow's population, at around 3,800 in 1850, had increased nearly tenfold to 35,000 by 1891. Palmer's was central to Jarrow's economy, both for the numbers employed there and for the ancillary businesses that served the needs of both the yard and town.

The shipyard generated high employment to Jarrow, but the industrial works created a harsh environment. Ellen Wilkinson, the town's historian and member of parliament from 1935 to 1947, quotes a newspaper source from 1858: "There is a prevailing blackness about the neighbourhood. The houses are black, the ships are black, the sky is black, and if you go there for an hour or two, reader, you will be black". According to Wilkinson, the yard's founder, Sir Charles Palmer, "regarded it as no part of his duty to see that the conditions under which his workers had to live were either sanitary or tolerable".

In the 1890s, Britain held a near monopoly of the world's shipbuilding, with a share of around 80%. This proportion fell during the early years of the 20th century to about 60%, as other countries increased their production. Palmer's remained busy, and during the years of the First World War built many of Britain's warships: the battleship HMS Resolution, the light cruiser HMS Dauntless, and numerous smaller vessels were all built in Jarrow. During the brief postwar boom of 1919–20, orders remained plentiful and Palmer's prospered. However, the firm's management had not anticipated the conditions that developed in the 1920s when, as Wilkinson says, "every industrial country that had bought ships from Britain was now building for itself". The firm made over-optimistic assessments of future demand, and invested accordingly. The anticipated demand did not materialise. By the mid-1920s, Palmer's was incurring heavy losses, and was close to bankruptcy. It was temporarily reprieved by a short-lived boom in 1929, when orders rose and the town briefly enjoyed the prospect of an economic recovery.

=== Closure of Palmer's ===
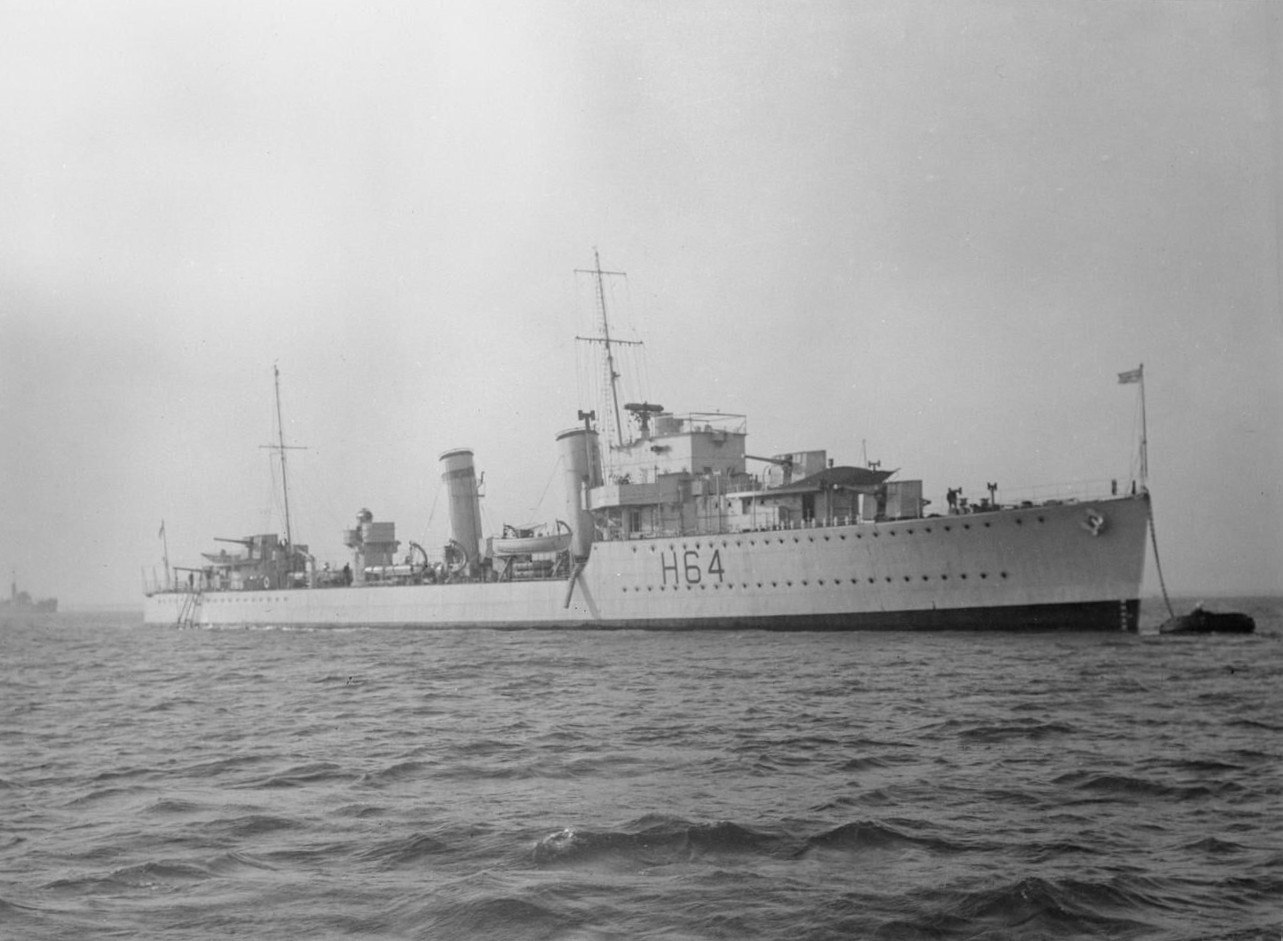
HMS Duchess, the last ship to be launched from Palmer's shipyard, July 1932

On 24 July 1930 Palmer's launched its thousandth ship, the tanker Peter Hurll. By this time the brief shipbuilding boom had been ended by the Great Depression, and there were no new orders on the firm's books. Rumours of impending reorganisation and rationalisation in the industry gave the workforce cause for anxiety, which deepened with the formation in 1930 of National Shipbuilders Security Ltd (NSS). This was a company created by the government to assist shipbuilders by acquiring failing yards and dismantling them, so that production was concentrated within a smaller number of profitable yards. To ensure this rationalisation was sustained, the closed yards were banned from any shipbuilding activity for at least 40 years.

In 1931, NSS was busy closing shipyards elsewhere in the country, while an order from the Admiralty for two destroyers kept Palmer's working until mid-1932. The second of these ships, HMS Duchess, was the last ship launched from the yard, on 19 July 1932. By this time, Palmer's was insolvent, but retained a faint hope of further naval contracts. These failed to materialise, and in June 1933 the firm's creditors appointed a receiver.

By December 1933 rumours of NSS interest in the yard were appearing in the press, and in the House of Commons Walter Runciman, the President of the Board of Trade, told members: "There is nothing to be gained by giving Jarrow the impression that Palmer's can be revived". He continued: "Would it not be very much better to make a clean sweep of that as a shipyard, and throw open to the world for sale what is one of the finest and most convenient sites anywhere in Europe?" Despite efforts by management and workers to find an alternative solution, in the early summer of 1934 NSS acquired the yard, closed it, and began to dismantle its plant. Blythe wrote: "The only sound to compete with the unfamiliar noise of the marsh birds ... was the ring of the breakers' hammers."

Following the Palmer's closure, a small hope of relief and some industrial resurrection was offered by the industrialist Sir John Jarvis, who held the ceremonial office of High Sheriff of Surrey. He was the prospective Conservative candidate for Guildford. On 4 October 1934, Jarvis announced the "adoption" of Jarrow by the county of Surrey, and promised to bring new industries to the town; he mentioned ship breaking, bottle manufacture and furniture-making. While acknowledging the generous principle behind Jarvis's scheme, Betty Vernon, the biographer of Jarrow politician Ellen Wilkinson, described it as ultimately superficial, offering little more than patchwork assistance. Blythe observes: "This excellent man failed, as anyone must fail who tries to play the good squire to a town of nearly forty thousand people".

=== Ellen Wilkinson ===
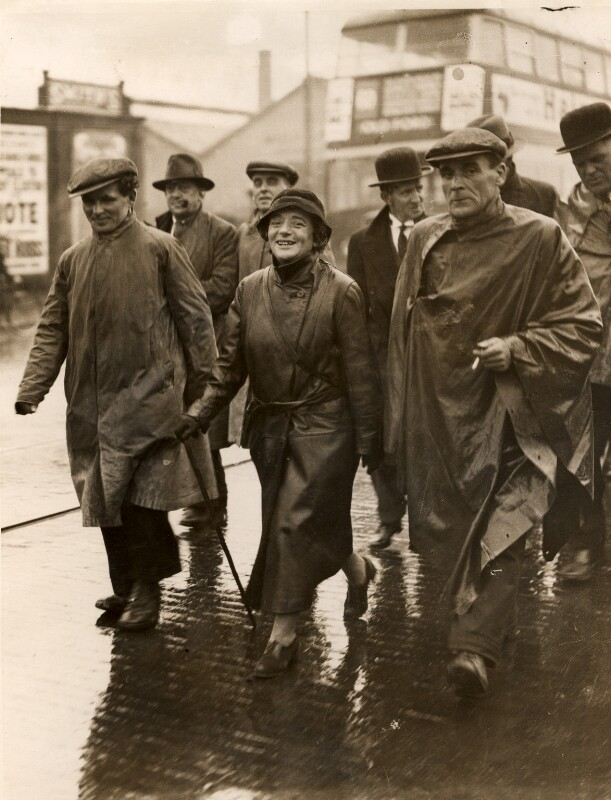
Ellen Wilkinson marching with the Jarrow Marchers, Cricklewood, London

In the 1931 general election, in the nationwide rout of Labour, the Jarrow constituency was won by the National Government's candidate, William Pearson, a Conservative borough councillor and former mayor. In 1932, when the mood in Jarrow was desperate—"a workhouse without walls" according to one commentator—the local Labour Party selected Ellen Wilkinson as its parliamentary candidate for the next general election. Wilkinson had helped to found the British Communist Party in 1920, and had a firebrand reputation. She had been associated with Hannington and the NUWM in the early 1920s, but had left the Communist Party in 1923 and had served as Labour MP for Middlesbrough East between 1924 and 1931.

Wilkinson felt a deep bond of sympathy with the people of Jarrow and the loss of the shipyard which was the life-source of the town. Early in 1934 she led a deputation of Jarrow's unemployed to meet the prime minister, MacDonald, in his nearby Seaham constituency. She says that at the end of the meeting MacDonald said to her: "Ellen, why don't you go out and preach socialism, which is the only remedy for all this?" This "priceless remark", she says, brought home the "reality and sham ... of that warm but so easy sympathy".

She became Jarrow's MP in the general election of November 1935, when she won the seat with a majority of 2,360. In the opening debate of the new parliamentary session, on 9 December 1935, she pleaded on behalf of her new constituents: "These are skilled fitters, men who have built destroyers and battleships and the finest passenger ships ... The years go on and nothing is done ... this is a desperately urgent matter and something should be done to get work to these areas which, Heaven knows, want work."

=== Proposed steelworks ===
While Jarvis's palliative measures were being developed, a more substantial project to bring industry back to Jarrow was under consideration. An American entrepreneur, T. Vosper Salt, became aware of the impending sale and break-up of Palmer's yard. He was convinced that the world demand for steel was about to rise, and thought that the site, with its ready-made docking and rail facilities, would be ideal for a new, modern steelworks. In January 1934, when an initial feasibility study report had proved favourable, Salt began discussions with the British Iron and Steel Federation (BISF), a steel producers' organisation formed that year as part of the National Government's rationalisation of the iron and steel industry. (Note: Wilkinson later described the Federation as "a group of men to whom national needs, even under the threat of approaching war, meant nothing more than the opportunity of wringing profits out of obsolete plant".)

The British steel industry was protected from more efficient foreign competition by the government's high tariff wall. The BISF, through its control of pricing, could also present a united front against new competition at home. When the feasibility report was received by the BISF in March 1935 the Federation's chairman, Sir Andrew Duncan, at first reacted positively. His members from the north-east were rather less enthusiastic. Only one of the large steel firms in the region, the Consett Iron Company, offered support for a Jarrow steelworks, while other BISF members put pressure on London's financial institutions to withhold capital from the new scheme. Reports of such tactics caused great anxiety in the Jarrow area, where the people were desperate for the new works to come about. In a reassuring speech shortly before the November 1935 general election, Baldwin, now leading the National Government, informed his listeners in Newcastle: "There is no truth in any of the reports that either the banks or any other authorities ... are making a dead set to prevent anything of the kind being done in the area".

"And, if ... [the Jarrow steelworks] is not going to happen, does that mean that the Government, who have created a practical monopoly in the steel trade and have given the trade everything that it wants, are now going to say that Lord Furness is going to have the monopoly of that steel trade, and the firms he controls are going to have the orders? That is what we want to know, and it is about time that we knew it".

— Ellen Wilkinson, House of Commons, 2 March 1936

After the election and the return of the National Government, little happened to support Baldwin's optimistic words. In the House of Commons on 2 March 1936, Wilkinson spoke of the "atmosphere of mystery" that surrounded the Jarrow scheme: "Publicly one sees tremendous optimism ... but when you see people privately there is a great deal of humming and ha'ing, and they are not quite sure". Meanwhile, the BISF argued that increased steel production should be achieved by expanding capacity in existing facilities, rather than by building new plant. Duncan, in a reversal of his earlier attitude, now opposed the provision of finance for Jarrow which, he felt, might create a precedent that other distressed areas could exploit. The BISF finally succeeded in watering down the scheme to the extent that it became unviable; Salt and his syndicate withdrew, and the scheme was dead, "strangled at birth" according to Wilkinson.

In a series of exchanges in the Commons with Runciman on 30 June, Wilkinson requested in vain that the matter be reconsidered by an independent body, rather than being decided by the BISF. One of the government's own negotiators, who had been involved in the project since its early stages, wrote in The Times: "A system which permits the adjudication on a proposal of national importance ... to be left in the hands of parties whose financial interests may run counter to that project, is not conducive to the enterprising development of the steel industry".

When, later in the summer, Runciman met workers from Jarrow the deputation encountered, in Wilkinson's words, "a figure of ice. Icily correct, icily polite, apparently completely indifferent to the woes of others." His insistence that "Jarrow must work out its own salvation", was described by Blythe as "the last straw in official cruelty"; to Wilkinson, the phrase "kindled the town", and inspired it to action.

== March ==
=== Preparation ===
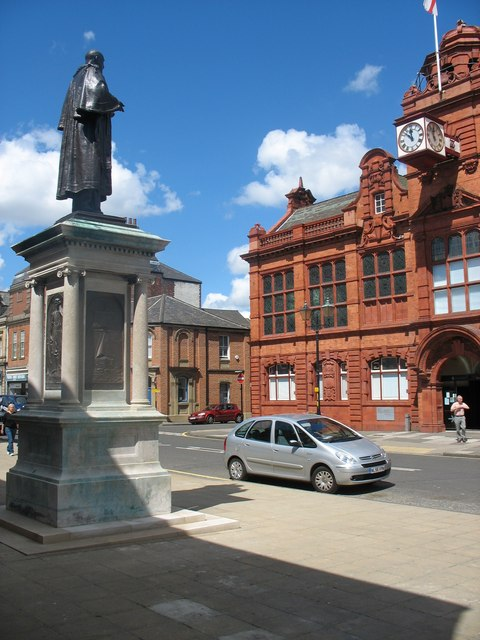
Jarrow Town Hall, with a statue of Sir Charles Palmer, 2007.

After the loss of the steelworks, David Riley, the chairman of Jarrow Borough Council, told a rally of the town's unemployed in July 1936: "If I had my way I would organise the unemployed of the whole country ... and march them on London so they would all arrive at the same time. The government would then be forced to listen, or turn the military on us". The idea of a march was taken up with enthusiasm by the mayor Billy Thompson, by Wilkinson, and by political, commercial and religious groups. It was decided that the march would be a local affair, representing the town, with no political connotations. It would be limited to 200 fit men who would arrive in London at the start of the new parliamentary session on 3 November 1936, when a petition from the town would be presented to the House of Commons. (Note: Although the number of marchers is usually given as 200, there is some confusion about the exact numbers who eventually participated. The historical record lists only 185 names; Special Branch reports refer to 207. It is on record that some of the original contingent dropped out during the journey and in some cases were replaced, but it is possible that some names are missing from the record.)

Riley was appointed chief marshal, with four subcommittees to deal with organisational detail. All the local political parties—Labour, Conservative and Liberal—gave their support, as did the town's churches and the business community. Relays of medical students from the Inter-Hospital Socialist Society agreed to accompany the march as medical attendants. A fund was begun, with an initial target of £800, to meet the costs of the march; ultimately, nearly double that amount was raised, locally and on the route. Public meetings were planned for the overnight stops, to publicise the plight of Jarrow and of other areas like it. One marcher explained: "We were more or less missionaries of the distressed areas, [not just] Jarrow".

On Monday 5 October the marchers, selected from over 1,200 volunteers, attended an ecumenical dedication service in Christ Church, Jarrow, where the blessing was given by James Gordon, the Bishop of Jarrow. This apparent endorsement by a senior cleric gained considerable press attention, but earned a sharp response from Hensley Henson, the Bishop of Durham. Henson, a severe critic of socialism and trade unionism, described the march as "revolutionary mob pressure", and regretted his colleague's association with "these fatuous demonstrations, which are mainly designed in the interest, not of the Unemployed, but of the Labour party".

As Jarrow's representatives prepared to leave, six regional contingents of the sixth National Hunger March were taking the road to London, where they were due to arrive a week after the Jarrow marchers. A group of blind veterans, organised by the National League of the Blind and Disabled, was also on the march, demanding better allowances for the country's 67,000 blind persons.

=== On the road ===
Route of Jarrow March, October 1936
Stage	Date	From	To	Distance
1	Mon 5 Oct	Jarrow	Chester-le-Street	12 mi (19 km)
2	Tue 6 Oct	Chester-le-Street	Ferryhill	12 mi (19 km)
3	Wed 7 Oct	Ferryhill	Darlington	12 mi (19 km)
4	Thu 8 Oct	Darlington	Northallerton	16 mi (26 km)
5	Fri 9 Oct	Northallerton	Ripon	17 mi (27 km)
	Sat 10 Oct	Rest days		—
	Sun 11 Oct	Rest days		—
6	Mon 12 Oct	Ripon	Harrogate	11 mi (18 km)
7	Tue 13 Oct	Harrogate	Leeds	15 mi (24 km)
8	Wed 14 Oct	Leeds	Wakefield	9 mi (14 km)
9	Thu 15 Oct	Wakefield	Barnsley	10 mi (16 km)
10	Fri 16 Oct	Barnsley	Sheffield	13 mi (21 km)
11	Sat 17 Oct	Sheffield	Chesterfield	12 mi (19 km)
	Sun 18 Oct	Rest day		—
12	Mon 19 Oct	Chesterfield	Mansfield	12 mi (19 km)
13	Tue 20 Oct	Mansfield	Nottingham	14 mi (23 km)
14	Wed 21 Oct	Nottingham	Loughborough	15 mi (24 km)
15	Thu 22 Oct	Loughborough	Leicester	11 mi (18 km)
16	Fri 23 Oct	Leicester	Market Harborough	14 mi (23 km)
17	Sat 24 Oct	Market Harborough	Northampton	17 mi (27 km)
	Sun 25 Oct	Rest day		—
18	Mon 26 Oct	Northampton	Bedford	21 mi (34 km)
	Tue 27 Oct	Rest day		—
19	Wed 28 Oct	Bedford	Luton	19 mi (31 km)
20	Thu 29 Oct	Luton	St Albans	10 mi (16 km)
21	Fri 30 Oct	St Albans	Edgware	11 mi (18 km)
22	Sat 31 Oct	Edgware	Marble Arch, London	8 mi (13 km)
Total				291 mi (468 km)

==== Week one: Jarrow to Ripon ====
After the service of dedication, the marchers left Jarrow Town Hall, cheered on by most of the town and bearing banners announcing themselves as the "Jarrow Crusade". By the following weekend they had travelled 69 mi (111 km) to the cathedral city of Ripon, where they were welcomed by the Bishop of Ripon and a delegation representing local churches. Receptions at the intervening stops had been mixed: lukewarm at Chester-le-Street, warm and friendly from the people in Ferryhill and also from the Conservative-controlled council in Darlington.

Wilkinson had left the march at Chester-le-Street to attend the Labour Party's annual conference, taking place in Edinburgh. The conference was not supportive of the march—one delegate criticised Wilkinson for "sending hungry and ill-clad men on a march to London". The Labour conference's negative stance brought angry responses from the marchers; Riley considered that they had been "stabbed in the back". The marchers were further dismayed to learn that the Ministry of Labour's Unemployment Assistance Board had ruled that their benefits would be reduced, since they were unavailable for work should jobs arise.

==== Week two: Ripon to Chesterfield ====
After a weekend's rest, the marchers proceeded to Harrogate. In this solidly Conservative, prosperous town the marchers were greeted warmly by the civic authorities and were fed by the Rotary Club. They were given sleeping quarters by the Territorial Army, a change from the school and church halls, and occasional workhouse accommodation, that was provided at most overnight stops. It was becoming evident that local Conservatives were often as likely to provide practical assistance as Labour, whose local parties were constrained by the attitude of the party's national leadership.

The marchers' claim that theirs was a unique situation, arising from specific actions, the closing of the shipyard and the blocking of the proposed steelworks, that could be remedied by immediate government action, may also have alienated local working-class communities. Cross-party support was important in maintaining the march's non-partisan ethos, a factor that led Riley to refuse a donation of £20 from a communist group, stating: "We are determined at all costs to preserve the non-political character of this Crusade".

At Harrogate Wilkinson rejoined the march, as it proceeded through southern Yorkshire towards Chesterfield in Derbyshire. The march was attracting wide publicity. In London the government worried that King Edward might exceed his constitutional limits and receive the marchers. The cabinet issued a statement that emphasised the constitutional means for expressing grievances, and condemned marches for causing "unnecessary hardship for those taking part in them"—"crocodile tears", according to Wilkinson.

In reaching Chesterfield on 17 October, the marchers had travelled 70 mi (110 km) during the week, and were at the approximate half-way point in their journey. That day, the Bishop of Durham was gratified and the marchers correspondingly disappointed, when in a letter to The Times the Bishop of Jarrow denied that his blessing on the march had indicated his support for the venture. The blessing was, he said an act of Christian duty. In general he believed that such marches should be discouraged. Wilkinson was forgiving of the bishop's volte-face, knowing, she later said, "the difficulties he had to face".

==== Week three: Chesterfield to Northampton ====
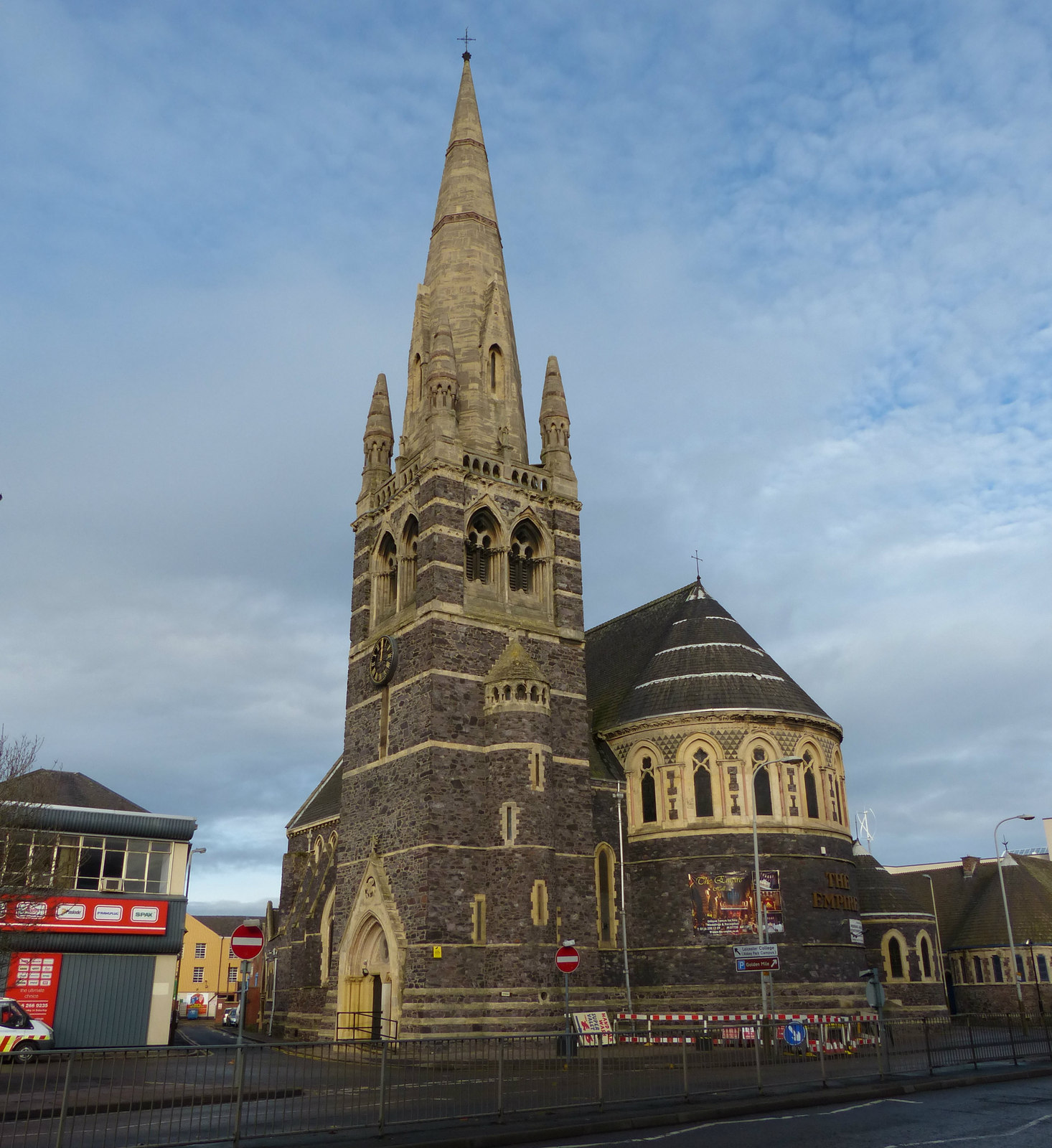
The Church of St Mark, Leicester, a stopping point for the march, 2013

The third week of the march covered the greatest distance of the four weeks—83 mi (134 km). At Mansfield, the Labour-controlled council defied the national leadership to give the marchers a warm welcome. This was matched by the reception from Nottingham's Conservative mayor and councillors, and supplemented by gifts of clothing and underwear from the city's manufacturers. At Leicester, the Co-operative Society's bootmakers worked through the night without pay, repairing the marchers' boots. According to some accounts, the marchers presented the vicar of the Church of St Mark, Leicester, with a wooden cross, although Matt Perry, in his history of the Jarrow March, indicates that this cross was donated in 1934 by the national hunger march.

From Leicester the march moved to Market Harborough. This was one of the least welcoming of all the overnight stops. No member of the local council greeted or visited the marchers, and they were forced to spend the night on the stone floor of an unfinished building (the local press later denied that this was so). On Saturday 24 October the marchers reached Northampton, arriving at the same time as the blind group. Wilkinson left to supervise arrangements in London, and would thereafter only participate intermittently until the final day, a week hence.

==== Week four: Northampton to London ====
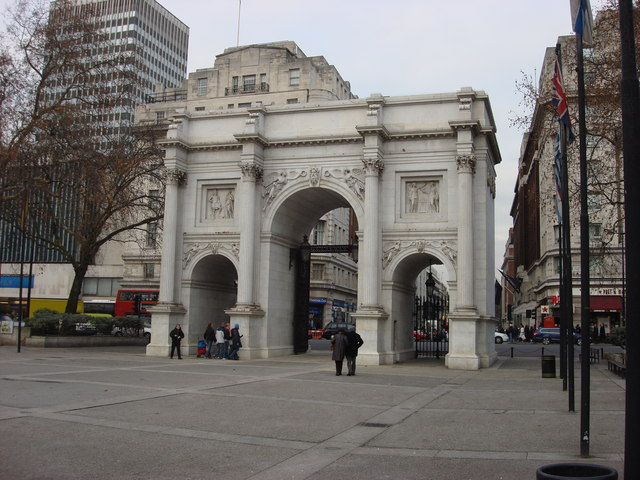
Marble Arch, Hyde Park, London, the terminus for the Jarrow March

The leg on Monday 26 October, from Northampton to Bedford, was the longest daily march—21 mi (34 km). Of the original contingent, 185 were still on the road, together with 10 replacements. To maintain the timetable for arrival at Marble Arch, the marchers took an extra rest day on Tuesday before marching, in teeming rain, the 19 mi (31 km) to Luton.

On 29 October, as the marchers walked from Luton to St Albans, the plight of Jarrow was the subject of exchanges in the House of Commons between Wilkinson and Baldwin. The prime minister drew attention to the recent decrease in Jarrow's unemployed, and said: "There is every reason to hope that the revival of industry now in progress in the Tyneside area will result in further opportunities for employment for those still unemployed at Jarrow." Wilkinson replied that the apparent decrease in Jarrow's unemployment figures arose from the amalgamation of the figures of Jarrow with those of neighbouring South Shields, and did not represent an increase in employment. She asked Baldwin whether he would break with tradition and meet a deputation of the marchers; the prime minister declined.

On the penultimate stage, from St Albans to Edgware, as the march neared its end, marchers began to contemplate the return home, and the prospect of "looking out of the window ... knowing that there's nothing, nothing at all to do". On the final day, for the short 8 mi (13 km) stretch, large crowds watched the column proceed through the London suburbs towards Marble Arch, marching to the accompaniment of their own mouth-organ band despite relentless rain. On arrival, as their leaders talked to the press, the marchers retired to their overnight accommodation in London's East End.

=== London ===
"Jarrow as a town has been murdered. It has been murdered as a result of the arrangement of two great combines—the shipping combine on the one side and the steel combine on the other ... What has the Government done? I do not wonder that this cabinet does not want to see us."

— Ellen Wilkinson, Hyde Park, 1 November 1936.

On Sunday 1 November the marchers proceeded to Hyde Park for a hastily organised public meeting. The Communist Party was holding a general rally in the park against unemployment; Wilkinson records that they "generously gave way for an hour and asked their great audience to swell our Crusade meeting". The police made an estimate of 3,000 for the crowd, journalist Ritchie Calder, who was present, put the figure at 50,000.

After a day's rest, the marchers' main event on Tuesday was a public meeting in the Memorial Hall, Farringdon Street. Among the guest speakers was the Rev. Canon Dick Sheppard, founder of the Peace Pledge Union. He told the marchers: "You have so aroused the conscience of the country that things are bound to happen". Sir John Jarvis, without prior warning, then revealed plans for a steel tubes mill on the Palmers site. The impression that Jarrow's problems could be solved thus, without government action, disconcerted the listening marchers. Wilkinson commented that such plans were in the future, and were no substitute for the town's requirement for immediate government intervention.

On Wednesday 4 November Wilkinson presented the Jarrow petition to the House of Commons. With over 11,000 signatures, it asked that "His Majesty's Government and this honourable House should realise the urgent need that work should be provided for the town without further delay." In the brief discussion that followed, Runciman said that "the unemployment position at Jarrow, while still far from satisfactory, has improved during recent months", to which James Chuter Ede, the Labour backbencher representing South Shields, the neighbouring constituency to Wilkinson's, replied that "the Government's complacency is regarded throughout the country as an affront to the national conscience". (Note: A second petition supporting the Jarrow position, and containing over 68,000 signatures collected from all over the Tyneside region, was handed in by Sir Nicholas Grattan-Doyle, the region's senior MP, immediately after Wilkinson had handed in Jarrow's. The second petition was rejected by the Commons Commission on Petitions because of procedural irregularities.)

Blythe summarises the marchers' anger and disillusionment: "And that was that. The result of three months' excited preparation and one month's march has led to a few minutes of flaccid argument during which the Government speakers had hardly mustered enough energy to roll to their feet". A "stay-in" strike was briefly proposed, before Wilkinson arranged a meeting with a cross-party group of MPs. The marchers' case was heard sympathetically; the meeting was warned that, given international uncertainties, they might come to regret the dismantling of an important shipbuilding facility for reasons of private profit. Such statements, according to Wilkinson, made members "distinctly uncomfortable". (Note: Among the MPs who attended the meeting was Clement Attlee, the leader of the Labour Party, who did not speak. However, on the following Sunday, 8 November, Attlee and a dozen other Labour MPs, including Aneurin Bevan, broke with the party's established policy and gave full support to the rally in Hyde Park that ended the National Hunger March.) The next day the marchers returned by train to Jarrow, where they received an ecstatic welcome from the town.

== Appraisal and legacy ==
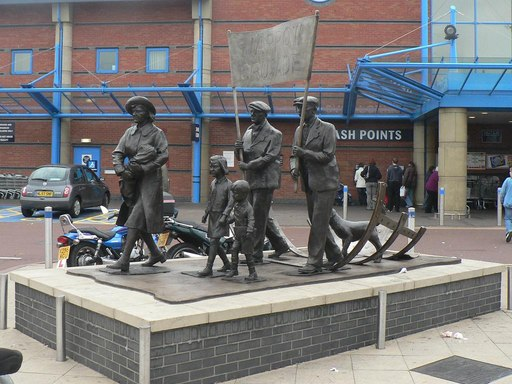
Bronze sculpture. The Spirit of Jarrow by Graham Ibbeson, unveiled in Jarrow Town Centre in 2001 as a memorial to the 1936 Jarrow March

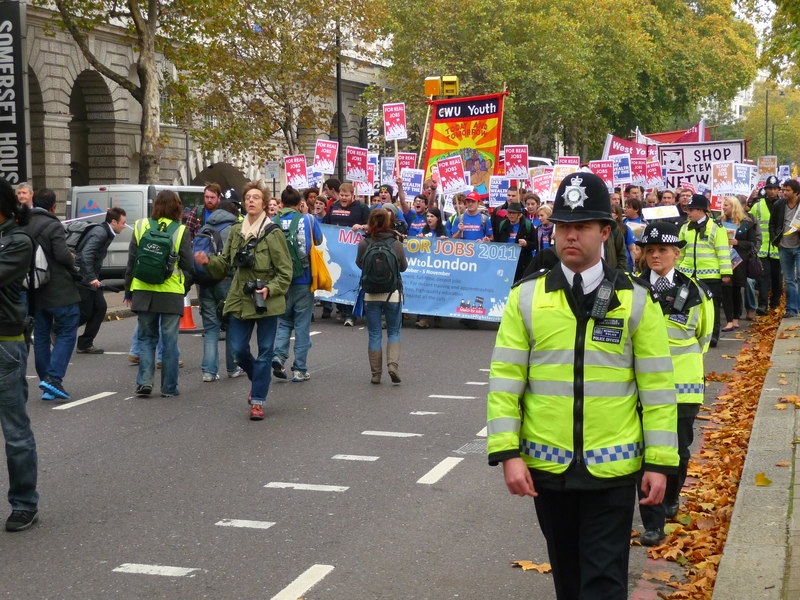
Re-enactment 2011: the "March for Jobs" in London, 5 November 2011

Before the start of the Second World War, and the establishment of war-based industries, Jarvis's initiatives brought modest relief to Jarrow. By 1939, about 100 men were employed in a small furniture factory and up to a further 500 in various metal-based industries set up on the Palmer's site. Jarvis had acquired the obsolete liners Olympic and Berengaria, to be broken up at the yard. (Note: The extent to which Jarvis's activities were basically self-serving has remained a debatable question. In a review of Perry's book, Lewis H. Mates reveals that Jarvis's son was adopted as Jarrow's Conservative candidate in 1938 (he never contested the constituency).) However, after their triumphant homecoming many of the marchers felt that their endeavour had failed. Cornelius Whalen, who at his death in 2003 was the last survivor of those who marched the full distance, (Note: Con Shiels, whose father acted as roadside cook during the march, and who himself walked the last leg from Edgware to Central London, died on 26 December 2012, aged 96. He was the last survivor of any who participated in the march.) said that the march was "a waste of time", but added that he had enjoyed every step.

Whalen's fellow marcher Guy Waller, on the 40th anniversary of the march in 1976, said that "[t]he march produced no immediate startling upsurge in employment in the town. It took the war to do that". These views are shared by the Daily Mirror columnist Kevin Maguire who described the march as "a heroic failure", while Matt Dobson, in The Socialist, writes that "out of all the hunger marches its aims were the most diluted and it made the most modest gains". The historians Malcolm Pearce and Geoffrey Stewart provide a positive perspective, arguing that the Jarrow March "helped to shape [post-Second World War] perceptions of the 1930s", and thus paved the way to social reform.

Perry observes that "the passage of time has transformed the Jarrow Crusade ... into a potent talisman with which many apparently seek association". Thus the Labour Party, which in 1936 shunned the march, later adopted it as "a badge of credibility". In 1950 the party featured the Jarrow banners on its election posters; the march then disappeared from view in an era of high employment, only to be invoked again when unemployment again became a political issue in the 1980s. In the late 20th century and beyond, Labour leaders—Michael Foot, Neil Kinnock, Tony Blair—have all associated themselves with the march.

In October 1986, on the 50th anniversary, a group from Jarrow and other towns along the way retraced the route to London. At that time of industrial recession, Jarrow once again had the highest level of unemployment in the country. The 75th anniversary in 2011 was marked by a "March for Jobs", that drew the ire of a Conservative MP, Robert Goodwill, who noted the high level of withdrawals in its early stages and dismissed it as "an insult to the memory of the Jarrow marchers ... They are not fit to walk in [their] footsteps".

Shortly after the return home in November 1936 Riley, together with three other Jarrow councillors who had led the march—James Hanlon, Paddy Scullion and Joseph Symonds—left Labour to form a breakaway group committed to a more direct fight for employment. All four later rejoined the party; Scullion and Symonds both served as the town's mayor, and Symonds was Labour MP for Whitehaven from 1959 to 1970.

In 1939, Wilkinson published her history of Jarrow, The Town that Was Murdered. A reviewer for The Economic Journal found the book "not quite as polemical as one might have expected", but felt that in her denunciation of the BISF Wilkinson had not taken full account of the state of the iron and steel industry in the 1930s. Wilkinson continued her parliamentary career, and from 1940 to 1945 held junior ministerial office in Churchill's wartime coalition government. In the 1945 Labour government she was appointed Minister of Education, with a seat in the cabinet, a post in which she served until her death, aged 55, in February 1947.

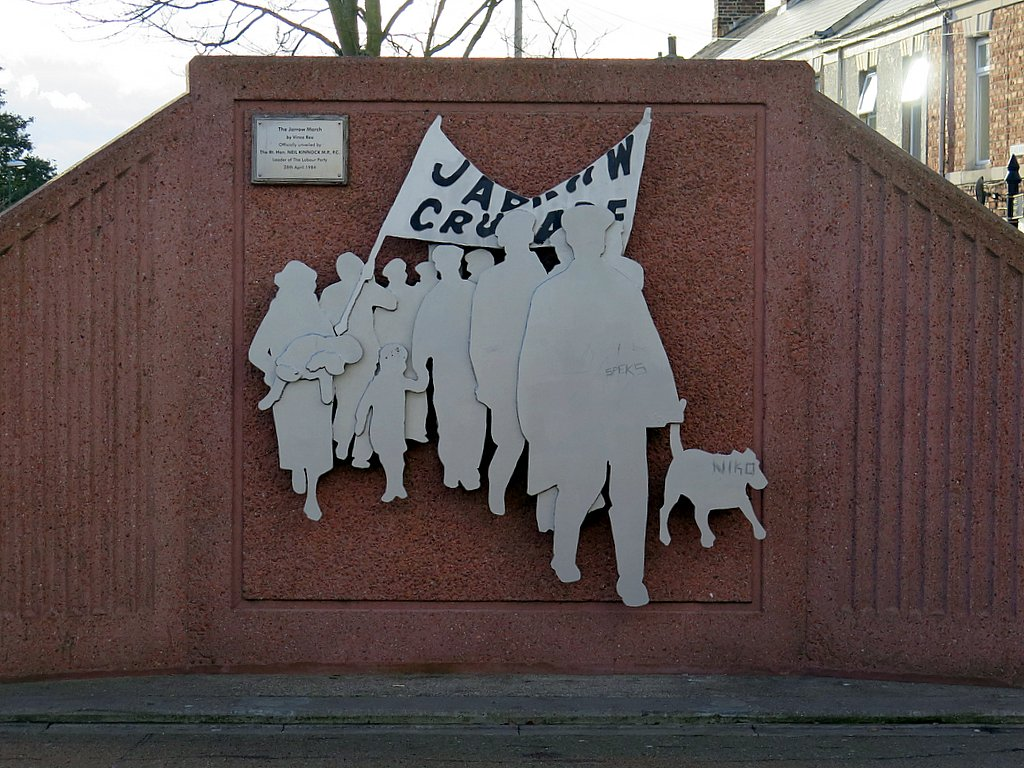
"The Jarrow March" sculpture at Jarrow Metro station

In 1974 the rock singer Alan Price released the "Jarrow Song", which helped to raise awareness of the events of 1936 among a new generation. Among dramatisations based on the Jarrow March is a play, Whistling at the Milestones (1977) by Alex Glasgow, and an opera, Burning Road (1996), by Will Todd and Ben Dunwell. In what Perry describes as one of the ironies surrounding the march, the opera was performed in Durham Cathedral in May 1997, in retrospective defiance of the bishop who had condemned the march.

The march also forms part of the backstory of the BBC television serial Our Friends in the North (1996). The character Felix Hutchinson is portrayed as a former marcher, and in the final episode his son takes him back to a Yorkshire village through which the march had passed.

On 29 October 2017, the Tyne Bridge was closed off to be a venue for The Freedom on The Tyne Finale, the finale of the 2017 Freedom City festival. The event, promoted by Newcastle University re-enacted many world civil rights stories throughout history. The event re-enactment of the march was described as a memorable closing to the finale. The town of Jarrow contains several commemorations, including a steel relief sculpture by Vince Rea at the new railway station, a tile mural designed by local schoolchildren, and a bronze sculpture—"The Spirit of the Crusade" by Graham Ibbeson—in the town centre. Buildings and street names bear the names of Wilkinson and Riley. Perry writes that "In Jarrow, landscape and memory have fused together, just as the red hot rivets once fastened great sheets of steel in Palmer's Yard."

== Notes and references ==
=== Sources ===
- Bartley, Paula (2014). Ellen Wilkinson: From Red Suffragist to Government Minister. London: Pluto Press. ISBN 978-0-7453-3237-6.
- Blythe, Ronald (1964). The Age of Illusion. Harmondsworth, UK: Penguin Books. OCLC 493484388.
- Floud, Roderick; Humphries, Jane; Johnson, Paul (2014). The Cambridge Economic History of Modern Britain Volume II: 1879 to present. Cambridge: Cambridge University Press. ISBN 978-1-107-03846-2. Archived from the original on 5 October 2022.
- Gardiner, Juliet (2010). The Thirties: An Intimate History. London: Harper Press. ISBN 978-0-00-731453-9.
- Garside, W.R. (1990). British Employment 1919–1939: A Study in Public Policy (PDF). Cambridge: Cambridge University Press. ISBN 978-0-521-36443-0. Archived (PDF) from the original on 2 April 2015.
- Kingsford, Peter (1982). The Hunger Marchers in Britain 1920–1840. London: Lawrence and Wishart. ISBN 978-0-85315-556-0.
- Lorenz, Edward H. (1991). Economic Decline in Britain. Oxford: The Clarendon Press. ISBN 978-0-19-828502-1.
- Pearce, Malcolm; Stewart, Geoffrey (1992). British Political History, 1867–1991. London: Routledge. ISBN 978-0-415-07247-2.
- Perry, Matt (2005). The Jarrow Crusade: Protest and Legend. Sunderland: University of Sunderland Press. ISBN 978-1-873757-60-4.
- Pickard, Tom (1982). Jarrow March. London: Allison and Busby. ISBN 978-0-85031-398-7.
- Ritchie, L.A., ed. (1992). The Shipbuilding Industry: a Guide to Historical Records. Manchester: Manchester University Press. ISBN 0-7190-3805-7. Archived from the original on 5 October 2022.
- Skidelsky, Robert (1970). Politicians and the Slump: The Labour Government of 1929–31. Harmondsworth, UK: Penguin Books. ISBN 978-0-14-021172-6.
- Smales, Bernard J. (1975). Economic History. London: W.H. Allen. ISBN 978-0-491-01654-4.
- Symington, Martin (2011). Sacred Britain: A Guide to Places that Shake the Soul. Chalfont St Peter, Bucks, England: Bradt Travel Guides. ISBN 978-1-84162-363-4. Archived from the original on 5 October 2022.
- Taylor, A.J.P. (1970). English History 1914–45. Harmondsworth, UK: Penguin Books. ISBN 978-0-14-021181-8.
- Vernon, Betty D. (1982). Ellen Wilkinson 1891–1947. London: Croom Helm. ISBN 978-0-7099-2603-0.
- Vernon, James (2007). Hunger: a Modern History. London: Belknap Press. ISBN 978-0-674-02678-0.
- Wilkinson, Ellen (1939). The Town that was Murdered. London: Victor Gollancz. OCLC 1423543.
