= Jarrow Hall =

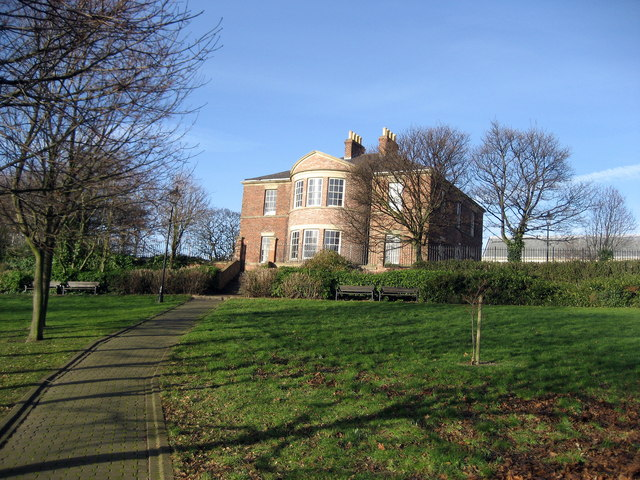

- Location in Tyne and Wear

General information
- Location: Tyne and Wear, England, UK
- Coordinates: 54.982°N 1.474°W
- OS grid: NZ337654

Jarrow Hall is a Grade II listed building in Jarrow, Northeast England, and part of the larger Jarrow Hall museum site. It was built around 1785 by local businessman Simon Temple; he went bankrupt in 1812 after a series of poor investments. The hall then passed through a number of hands before being let to the Shell Mex company in 1920, and then the Jarrow Council in 1935. The Council used the hall for a storage depot, eventually letting the building become derelict and in threat of demolition. It was rescued by the St Paul's Development Trust, which funded a £50,000 restoration project.

The hall then became the Bede Monastery Museum in 1974, as a means of exhibiting information about local scholar Bede - the location of the hall next to St Paul's Church, Jarrow - part of the Monkwearmouth-Jarrow Abbey - meant it was an ideal location for the new museum. The Bede Monastery Museum became part of Bede's World which operated from 1993 to 2016, and is now part of Jarrow Hall - Anglo-Saxon Farm, Village and Bede Museum.

The hall is now used as the cafe for visitors to the museum and also houses the museum offices. A permanent exhibition entitled 'The Many Faces of Jarrow Hall' chronicles the lives of previous residents of the hall.

Adjacent to the hall is the Grade II listed Jarrow Bridge which crosses the River Don, and once carried the main road to South Shields.
