= Jarrow Town Hall =

Municipal building in Jarrow, Tyne and Wear, England

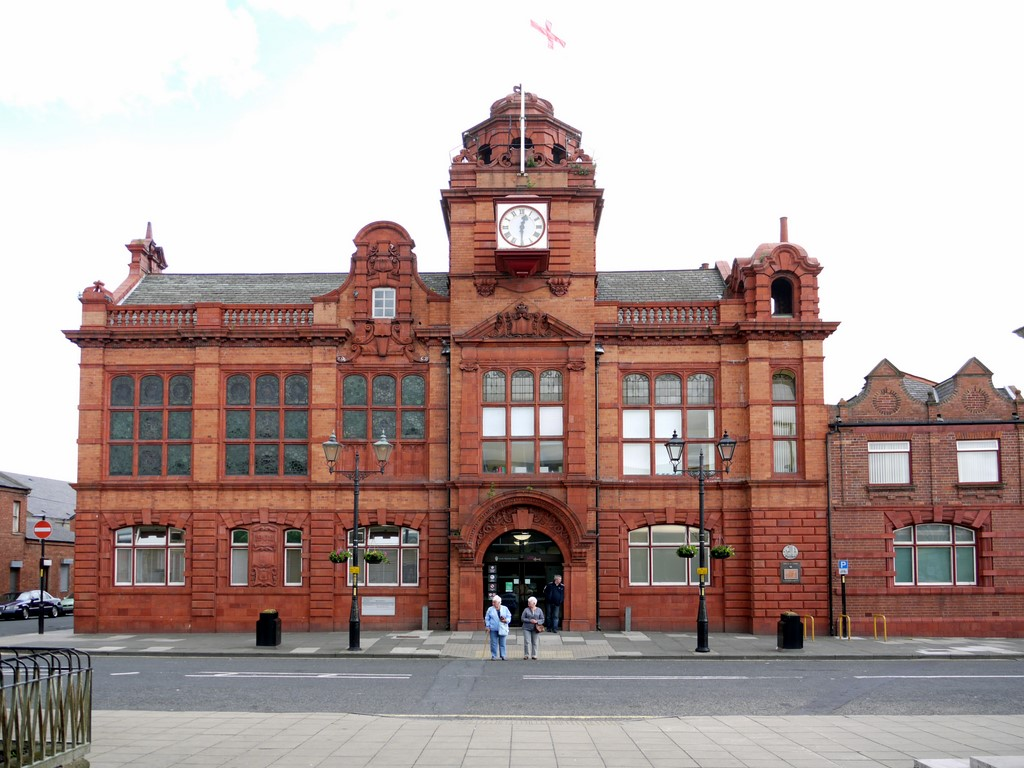
- Jarrow Town Hall

- Shown in Tyne and Wear
- 54.9816°N 1.4900°W
- Location: Grange Road, Jarrow

History
- Built: 1904

Site notes
- Architect: Fred Rennoldson
- Architectural style: Baroque style

Listed Building – Grade II
- Official name: Jarrow Town Hall
- Designated: 26 February 1985
- Reference no.: 1299416

Jarrow Town Hall is a municipal building in Grange Road, Jarrow, Tyne and Wear, England. The town hall, which was the headquarters of Jarrow Borough Council, is a Grade II listed building.

== History ==
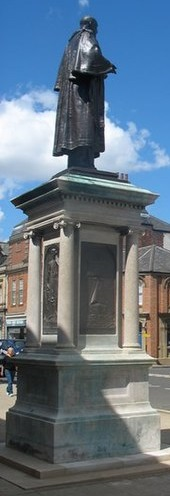
Statue of Sir Charles Palmer

Following significant population growth, largely associated with the shipbuilding industry, the town was incorporated as a municipal borough in May 1875. The borough council established itself in some offices on the corner of Grange Road and Wylam Street which were referred to as the "Corporation Chambers". These offices included a council chamber, a town clerk's office and a medical officer's office.

In the late 19th century civic leaders decided to demolish the old Corporation Chambers and build a more substantial structure on the same site. The foundation stone for the new building was laid by Lady Gertrude Palmer, the wife of the local member of parliament, Sir Charles Palmer, on 9 October 1902. The new building was designed by a local architect, Fred Rennoldson, in the Baroque style, built in red brick with terracotta facings at a cost of £12,000 and was officially opened by Sir Charles Palmer on 15 June 1904.

The design involved an asymmetrical main frontage with five bays facing onto Grange Road with a turret, which slightly projected forward, in the south east corner; the fourth bay from the left contained an arched doorway flanked by pilasters supporting a moulded surround; there was a three-light mullioned window on the first floor flanked by pilasters supporting an open pediment containing the borough coat of arms; above that there was a tower with an octagonal cupola. The other bays contained three-light mullioned windows on the first floor and there was a balustrade at roof level; the third bay from the left featured a dormer window with a shaped surround. Internally, the principal rooms were the courtroom, which was used for county court hearings and was accessed from the Wylam Street entrance, and the council chamber. A plaque, which commemorated the lives of members of the 1st Durham Engineers who had died in the Second Boer War, was relocated from the regiment's drill hall to the town hall shortly after the latter opened.

The town hall was the starting point for the Jarrow March, a protest organised by the borough council over local poverty and, in particular, the impact on the local community of the closure of Palmer's Shipyard, a business venture which Sir Charles Palmer had founded in 1852. An original banner carried by the marchers on their journey to London was retained and later placed on display in the town hall.

A roll of honour, which commemorated the lives of local people who had died in the Second World War, was installed in the town hall shortly after the end of that war. A projecting clock was installed on the façade of the building in 1951 by the Synchronome Company; it sounds the Westminster chimes on five bells. A plaque in the Town Hall commemorates the 'Surrey Fund' set up by Sir John Jarvis in the 1930s, as well as the 1951 Festival of Britain, in connection with the installation of the clock. Queen Elizabeth II, accompanied by the Duke of Edinburgh, visited the town hall on 29 October 1954.

The town hall continued to serve as the headquarters of Jarrow Borough Council but ceased to be the local seat of government when the enlarged South Tyneside Council was formed in 1974. It was subsequently used by South Tyneside Council as a local hub for housing advice and council tax queries.

A statue of Sir Charles Palmer, which had been designed by Albert Toft and originally unveiled by Lady Gertrude Palmer at Jarrow Riverside Park in 1903, was removed from the park, as part of works intended to facilitate the construction of the Second Tyne Tunnel, in April 2007; it was then refurbished and re-erected in a position facing the town hall in June 2007. The council approved a programme of improvement works, which included the re-wiring and damp-proofing of the building, in March 2020.
