= Liber epigrammatum =

Latin epigrammatic poems by Bede

The Liber epigrammatum is a collection of Latin epigrammatic poems composed by the Northumbrian monk Bede (d. 735). The modern title comes from a list of his works at the end of his Historia ecclesiastica gentis Anglorum (V.24.2): "librum epigrammatum heroico metro siue elegiaco" ("a book of epigrams in the heroic or elegiac meter").

== Attestation and contents ==
Although the collection no longer survives complete, much of its content has been reconstructed by Michael Lapidge from scattered attestations of appropriate verse attributed to Bede. Within decades of Bede's death, the Liber epigrammatum had been partly incorporated into a sylloge (collection) of similar verse by Milred of Worcester (d. 774/75). While all that survives of Milred's sylloge is a single medieval manuscript fragment (Urbana, University of Illinois Library, 128, copied in the mid-tenth-century, perhaps at Worcester), that manuscript was seen in a more complete form by the antiquary John Leland, whose notes on its contents survive. Other poetry by Bede that could plausibly have been included in the Liber epigrammatum was transmitted by other medieval anthologists. In the estimation of Michael Lapidge,

in the end, it was probably the very disparate nature of the contents of the Liber epigrammatum—tituli, epitaphs, prayers, psalm paraphrases, etc.—which invited individual compilers to select individual items from the collection rather than to make the effort to copy the collection entire; and that, presumably, is why the Liber epigrammatum has not come down to us intact.

In Lapidge's reconstruction (and following the order of his edition), the collection included the following works, which survive in whole or in part:

Number	Title	Notes	Evidence/witnesses
1	Versus Bedae de tractatu Hieronymi in Esiaim	Jerome's commentary on the Book of Isaiah	Leland; Paris, Bibliothèque Nationale de France, lat. 8071, f. 61v
2	Aenigmata Bedae	Riddles, mostly logogriphs	Leland; Cambridge, Cambridge University Library, Gg. 5. 35, ff. 418v-419r
3	Epigramma Bedae ad S. Michaelem	A lost epigram, apparently a titulus for a church dedicated to St Michael	Leland
4		A lost epigram, apparently a titulus for a church dedicated to St Mary, perhaps the one belonging to the monastery of St Peter at Monkwearmouth	Leland
5	Versus eiusdem in porticu ecclesiae S. Mariae, ab Wilfrido episcopo constructa in quibus mentionem facit Accae episcopi	A lost epigram, apparently a titulus for a church dedicated to St Mary, perhaps the one founded in Hexham by Wilfrid	Leland
6	Titulus for an apse in a church built by Bishop Cyneberht		Leland; Urbana, University of Illinois Library, 128, f. 2v
7	Prefaratory epigram to Bede's Expositio Apocalypseos	Twenty-two lines	Nearly all of the 113 manuscripts of the Expositio
8	Prefaratory epigram to Bede's De natura rerum	Four lines	Over 130 manuscripts of De natura rerum
9	Prefaratory epigram to Bede's De locis sanctis	Six lines	At least 47 manuscripts of De locis sanctis
10	Prefaratory epigram to Bede's Commentarius in Epistolas septem catholicas	Ten lines	Many of the 112 manuscripts of the Commentarius, plus some manuscripts of the epigram independently
11	Epigram on the translation of St Cuthbert (AD 698)	Eighteen lines in elegiac couplets	At least 8 manuscripts
12	Epitaph for Bishop Wilfrid		Manuscripts of the Historia ecclesiastica gentis Anglorum
13	Oratio Bedae presbyteri	A prayer	Orléans, Bibliothèque Municipale, 184 [161], p. 296 (the Fleury Prayerbook); London, British Library, Royal 2. A. XX, f. 39r-v (the Royal Prayerbook)
14	Metrical version of Psalm 41 (42)		Alcuin's De laude Dei and four other Continental manuscripts.
15	Metrical version of Psalm 83 (84)		London, British Library, Royal 2. A. XX, f. 39v (the Royal Prayerbook)
16	Metrical version of Psalm 112 (113)		Cambridge, Cambridge University Library, Ll. 1. 10, f. 43r (the Book of Cerne), Alcuin's De laude Dei, and four other Continental manuscripts
17	Fragments of a psalm paraphrase	Three lines, pertaining to psalms 3, 66 (67) and 70 (71) (either originally as one poem or several)	Alcuin's De laude Dei, and two other Continental manuscripts
18	Tituli from the Codex Amiatinus	A fourth line added to a three-line hexametrical text from Isidore's Versus de bibliotheca (f. 4v) and an elegiac distich captioning a miniature of Ezra (f. 5r)	Florence, Biblioteca Medicea Laurenziana, Amiatino I (the Codex Amiatinus)
19	Unlocated line from Bede's Historia abbatum	One hexametrical line in the Historia abbatum, which might derive from a lost epigram on Abbot Eosterwine	Manuscripts of the Historia abbatum
20	Unlocated lines from the 'Urbana Sylloge'	A single unattributed hexameter which could, like some other texts in the manuscript, belong to Bede	Urbana, University of Illinois Library, 128, f. 2v
21	Unlocated line quoted by thirteenth-century grammarians	A hexameter including the Greek word tristega	Roger Bacon's Greek grammar; an anonymous commentary on a Carolingian hymn called Vt queant laxis
22	Concluding epigram to Bede's Liber epigrammatum	An acephalous fragment in elegiac couplets	Munich, Bayerische Staatsbibliothek, Clm. 19410, pp. 1-62 (p. 56)

=== Aenigmata ===
A significant work of the Liber epigrammatum is nineteen aenigmata ("riddles, enigmas"), which survive only in Cambridge, Cambridge University Library Gg.5.35 (fols 418v-419r), a manuscript otherwise noted for containing the Carmina cantabrigensia, but also containing collections of Latin riddles by Symphosius, Boniface, Aldhelm, Tatwine, and Eusebius. Although Frederick Tupper doubted the attribution to Bede ("the essential unlikeness of the enigmas of the Cambridge MS to those that we meet elsewhere proclaims their author's originality as truly as the inadequate diction, awkward syntax, incorrect grammar, and halting meter attest his literary limitations"), Lapidge has found that metrical and grammatical infelicities in the material can be explained by scribal transmission following composition, and that the works plausibly belong to Bede. Subsequently, Andy Orchard was equivocal on the question. The riddles are accompanied by an extensive commentary.

In Tupper's estimation, Lapidge edited the riddles as one thirty-two-line poem:

number	lines	Latin solution (if present)	English explanation
1	1-5		a meditation on how Hell can seem more valuable than Heaven
2	6	F. M. Mel.	the letters f and m: by switching them, the word fel (gall) changes to mel (honey)
3	7	Os.	this monosyllable can mean both 'mouth' and 'bone'
4	8	Amor.	the word amor (love) which, reversed, reads Roma (Rome)
5	9	Omen.	the word ''omen'' ("augury")
6	10	Seges.	cornfield
7	11	Apes.	bees
8	12	I.	the letter ''I''
9	13	O.	the letter ''O''
10	14	Bonus.	the word ''bonus'' ("good")
11	15	Peruersus.	the word ''peruersus'' ("corrupted")
12	16	Navis.	ship
13	17-19	O. u. a.	the letters ''O'', ''u'', and ''a''
14	20-21		arrow
15	22		Judgement Day
16	23		Aetas hominis (a person's life)
17	24-27	[Balena]	whale
18	28-32	Digiti.	a meditation on the fingers as they write and produce scribal errors

==== Examples ====
Most of Bede's aenigmata are logogriphs, for example 11 (line 15), "Peruersus bonus est, breuitati si caput absit" ("something perverse is good, if its beginning is absent through abbreviation"). The solution to this riddle is that if one removes the first syllable from the word peruersus ("corrupted, perverse") one gets the word uersus, which means "changes" (and also "a line of poetry"). A few are true riddles, however, including 17 (lines 24-27):

Quis nolens hospes maris illustrat tenebrosa?
A nullo pastus pascit populum numerosum:
unius arte hominis perit at non fauce ualebit
una namque die numquam consumtus abibit.

Translation:

What unwilling guest of the sea illuminates the shadows?—
eaten by no other sea-creature it feeds a numerous populace:
it perishes through the skill of one man, but (one man) shall achieve nothing with his jaw(s),
for it shall never depart having been consumed in one day.

As glossed by Lapidge,

the "guest from the sea" is apparently a whale (CETE); its blubber provides oil for lamps and lighting (illustrate tenebrans); no other sea-creature feeds off it, but its flesh feeds an entire population; although it perishes through the skill of a single whaler, that whaler could not consume it by himself: indeed the whale could not be consumed in a single day.

== Editions ==
- Frederick Tupper, Jr., 'Riddles of the Bede Tradition', Modern Philology, 2 (1905), 561-72.
- Michael Lapidge, ed. and tr. Bede's Latin Poetry. Oxford Medieval Texts. Oxford: Clarendon Press, 2019. ISBN 9780199242771.

== See also ==
- Anglo-Saxon riddles
