= Trinity Church (Summer Street, Boston) =

Church building in Massachusetts, US

Coordinates: 42°21′17.86″N 71°3′35.07″W

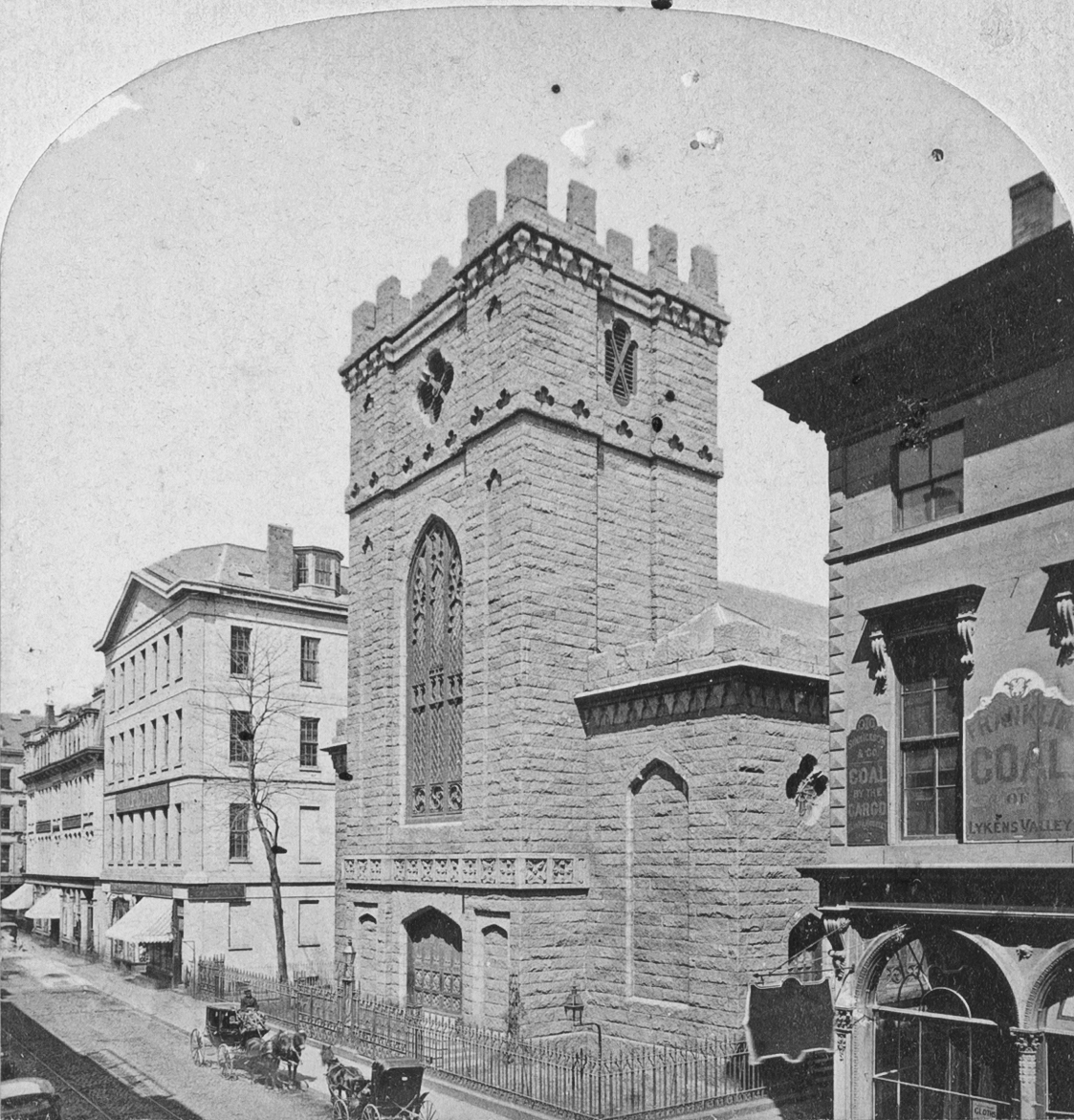
Trinity Church on Summer St., 19th century

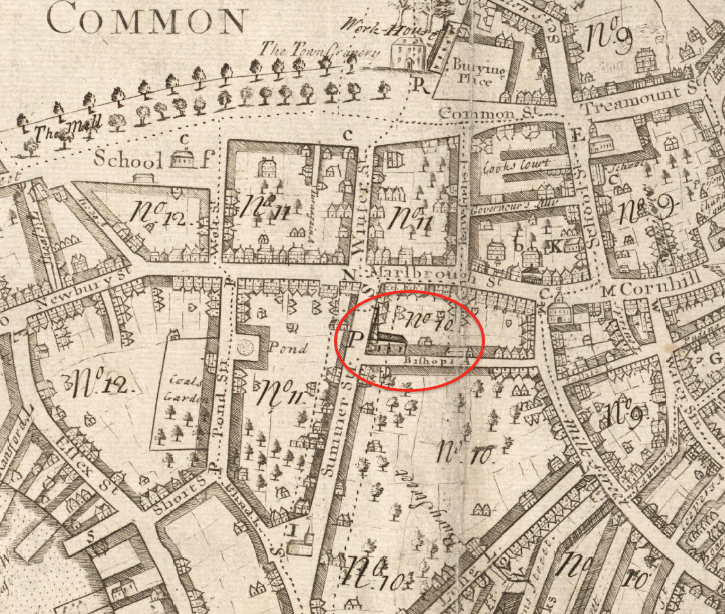
Detail of 1743 map of Boston, showing location of Trinity Church at corner of Summer St. and Bishops Alley

Trinity Church (1735–1872) was an Episcopal church in Boston, Massachusetts, located on Summer Street. It housed Boston's third Anglican congregation. The Great Fire of 1872 destroyed the church building, and by 1877 the congregation moved into a new building in Back Bay.

== History ==
=== 1728–1827 ===
When Boston's King's Chapel became overcrowded, some members of the congregation organized a new church beginning in 1728. The newly constructed Trinity Church opened in 1735. The wood building "was 90 feet long, and 60 broad, without any external adornment. It had neither tower nor steeple, nor windows in the lower story of the front. There were 3 entrances in front unprotected by porches. The interior was composed of an arch resting upon Corinthian pillars with handsomely carved and gilded capitals. In the chancel were some paintings, considered very beautiful in their day."

Ministers included Addington Davenport (1740–1746); William Hooper (1747–1767); William Walter (1767–1776); Samuel Parker (1779–1804); John Sylvester John Gardiner (1805–1830).

Parishioners included Peter Faneuil, Charles Apthorp, Philip Dumaresq, William Coffin, Thomas Aston Coffin, Leonard Vassall, Samuel Hale Parker. In 1789, George Washington worshipped at the church.

=== 1828–1872 ===
George W. Brimmer designed the second Trinity Church building on Summer Street, completed in 1829. One writer described it as a "massive temple of rough-hewn granite and ponderous square front tower" The "Gothic Revival-style church served as a prototype for many of the earliest New England churches in the Gothic Revival style."

Ministers included George Washington Doane (1830–1833); Jonathan Wainwright (1833–1838); Manton Eastburn (1843–1869); Phillips Brooks (1869–1891).

After the fire of 1872 swept through downtown Boston, Trinity Church fell to ruins: "its broken tower and partly crumbled walls presenting the most picturesque ruin of all in that costly conflagration."

By 1877, the congregation moved into its new Trinity Church building in Copley Square.

=== Ministers ===
- Addington Davenport (1740–1746)
- William Hooper (1747–1767)
- William Walter (1768–1776)
- Samuel Parker (1779–1804)
- John Sylvester John Gardiner (1805–1830)
- George Washington Doane (1831–1832)
- Jonathan Mayhew Wainwright (1833–1838)
- Manton Eastburn (1842–1868)
- Phillips Brooks (1869–1891)

== See also ==
- Trinity Church, Boston

== Image gallery ==
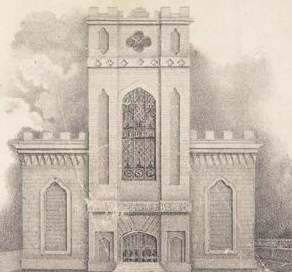
The newly constructed Trinity Church building, Boston; illustration published in Bower of Taste, c. 1829

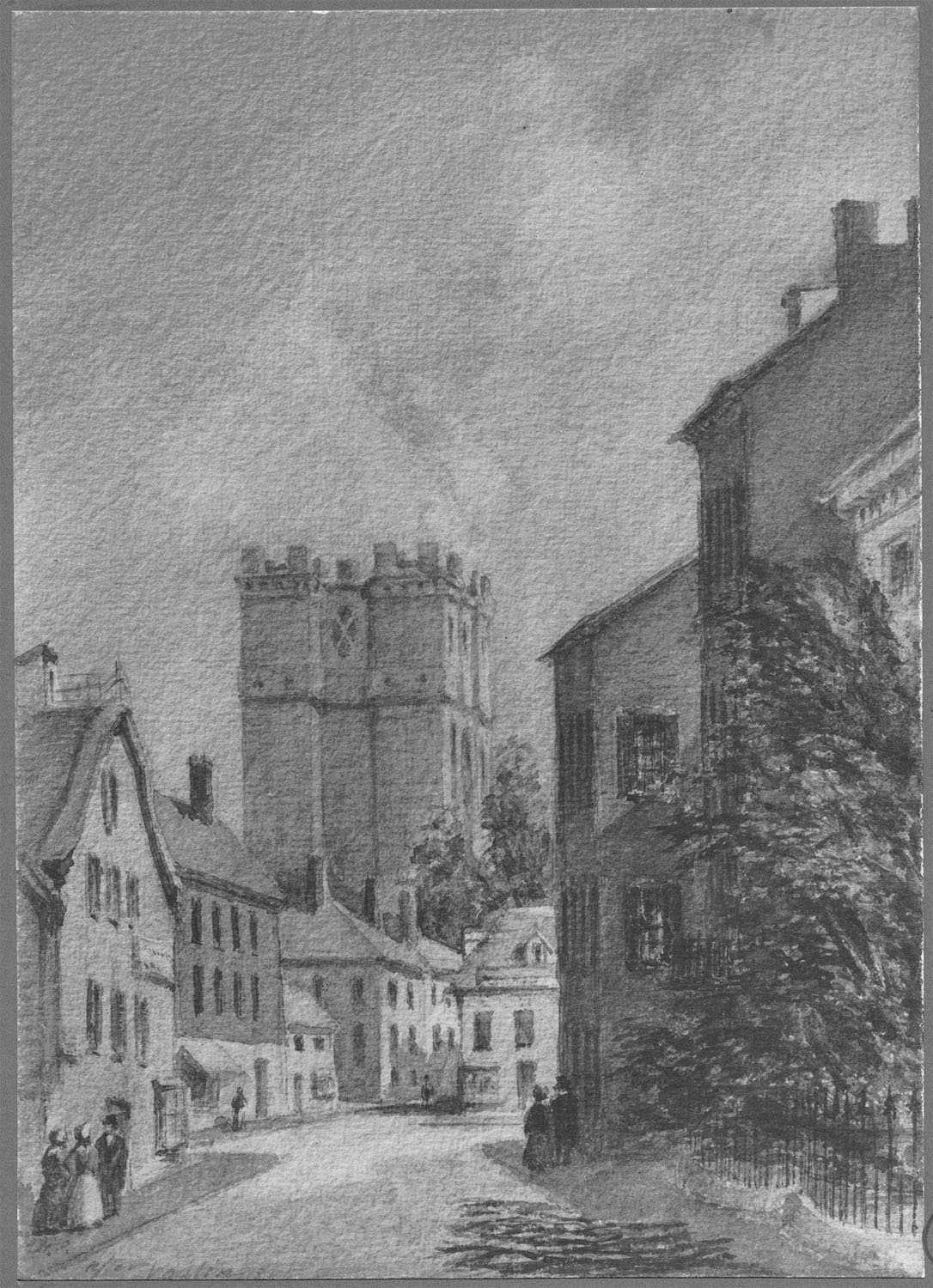
Summer Street view, 1846

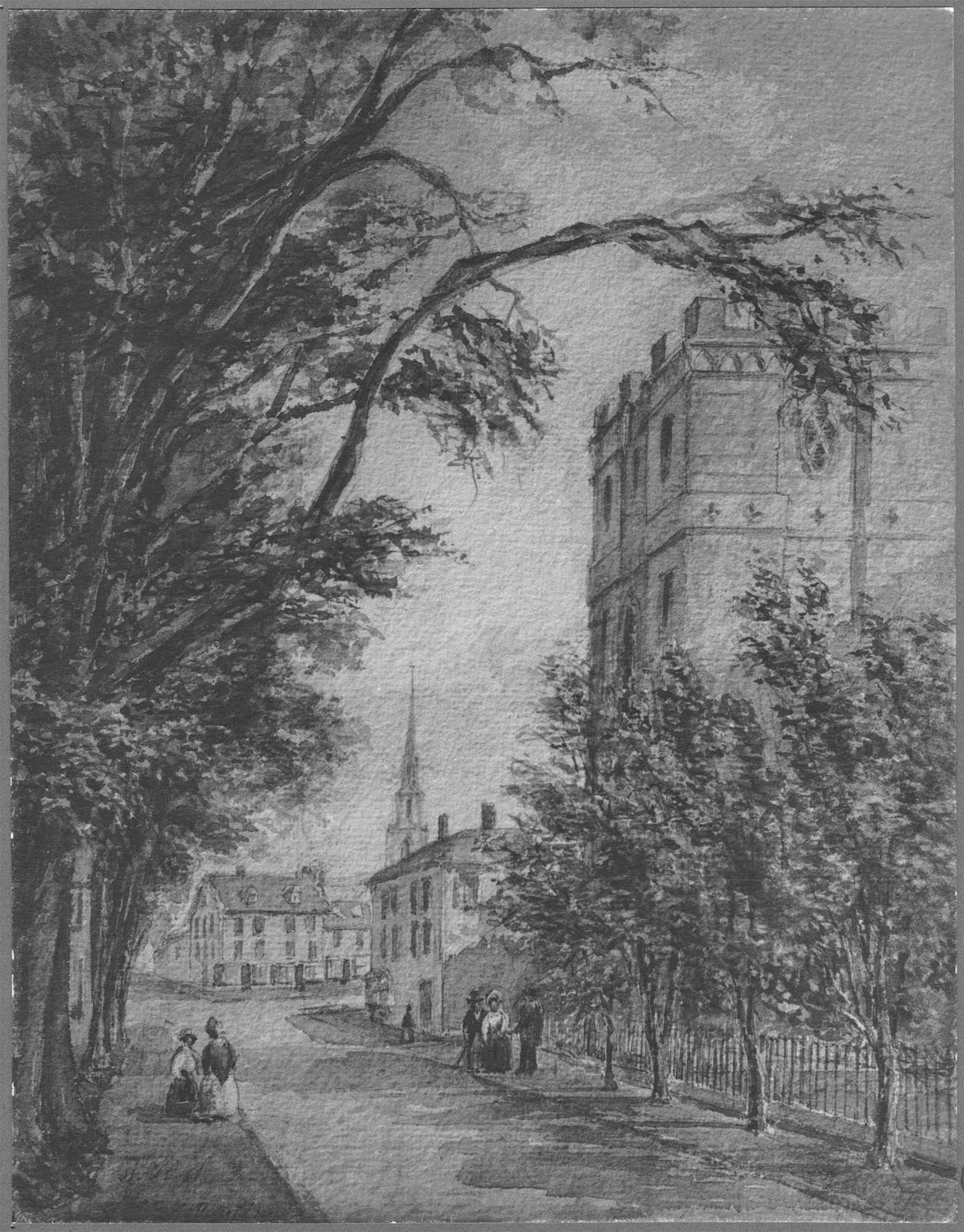
Summer Street view, 1846

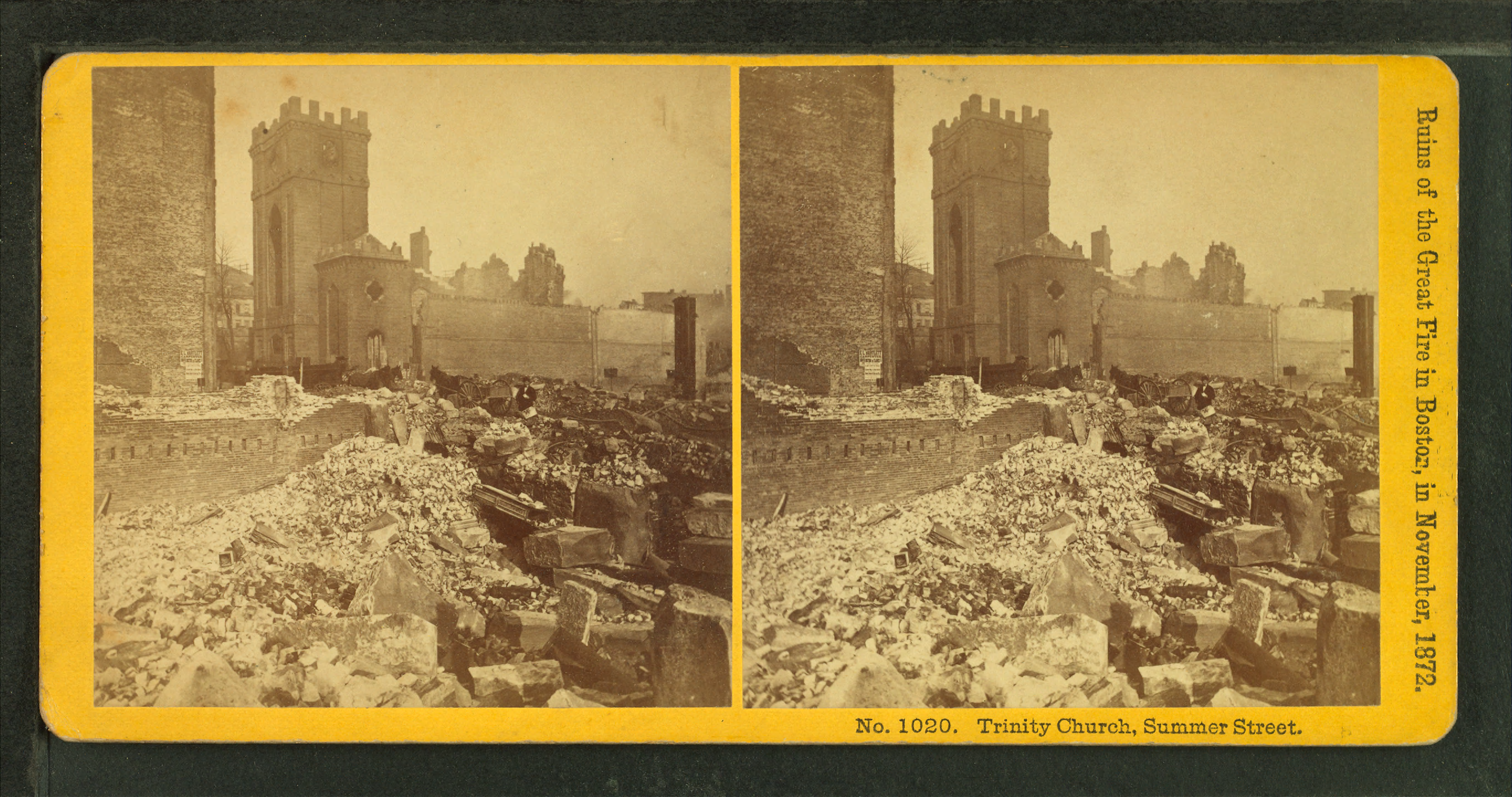
Trinity Church on Summer St., after fire of 1872

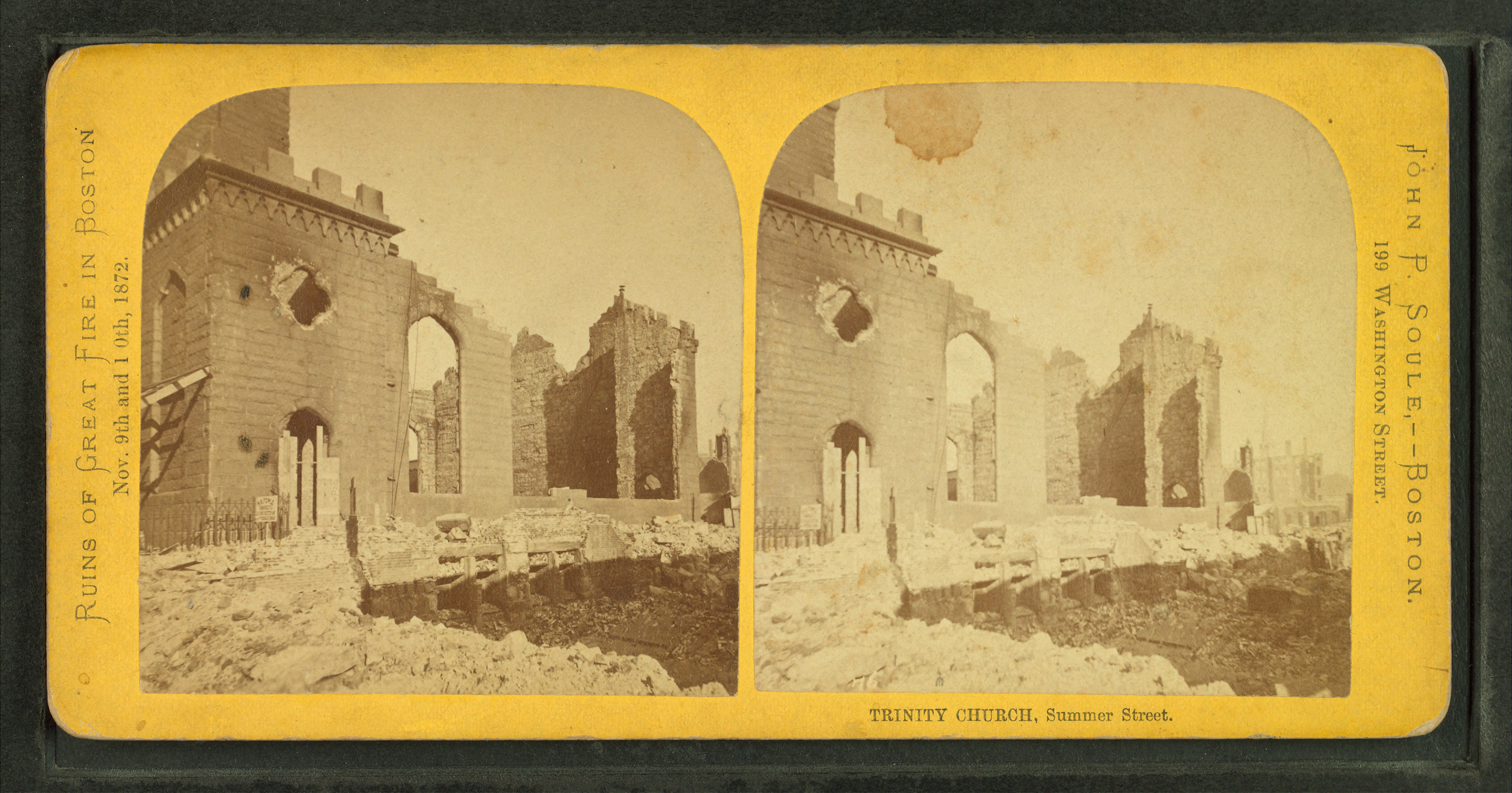
Trinity Church on Summer St., after fire of 1872

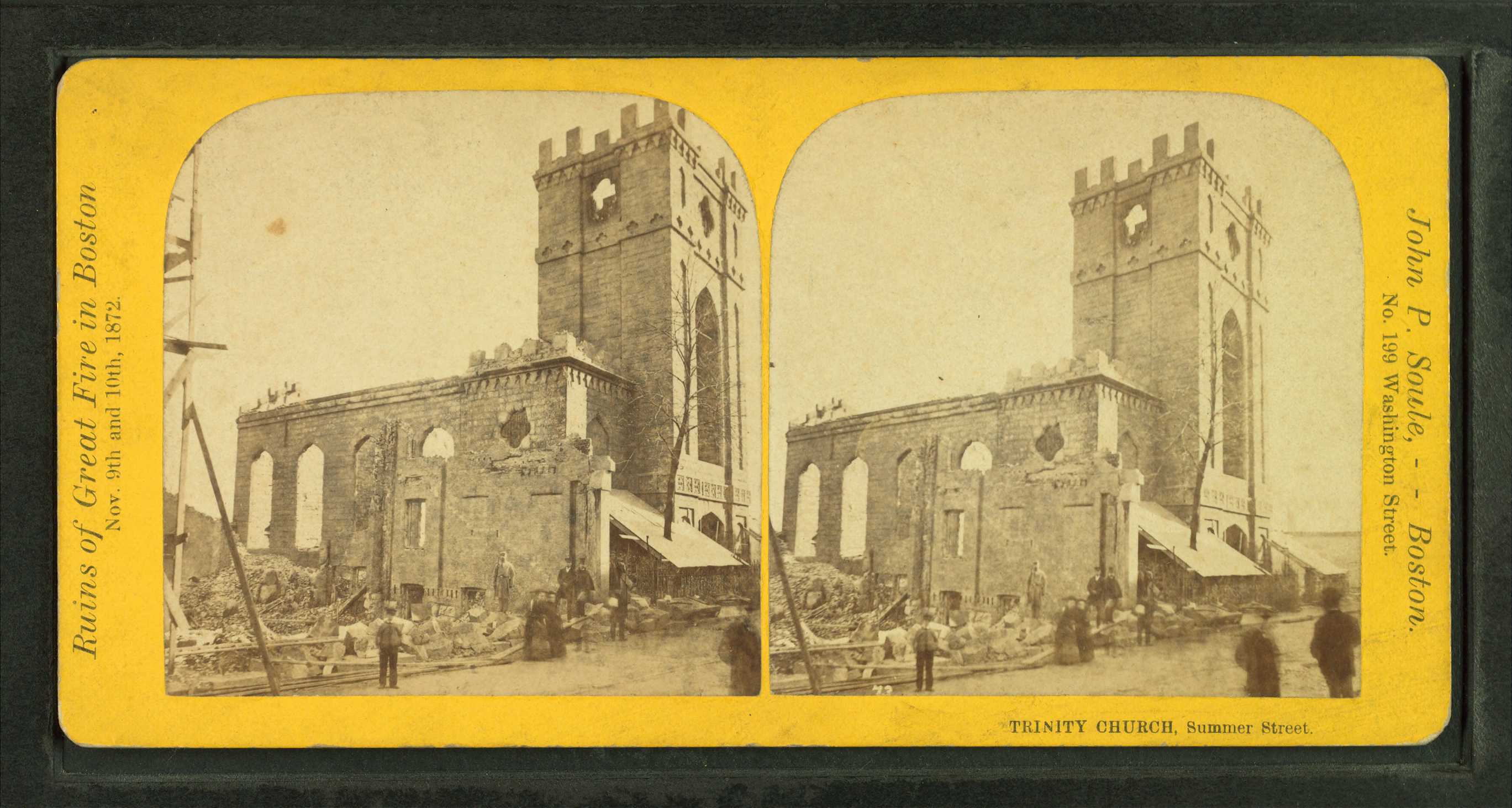
Trinity Church on Summer St., after fire of 1872
