= List of manuscripts of Bede's Historia Ecclesiastica =

This list of manuscripts of Bede's Historia Ecclesiastica gives the location and name of known surviving manuscripts of Bede's most famous work, the Historia ecclesiastica gentis Anglorum (Ecclesiastical History of the English People).

== The c and m texts ==
The majority of the manuscripts of Bede's Historia Ecclesiastica fall into one of two groups, known to scholars as c and m. The distinction between these two groups was first noticed by Charles Plummer, in his Baedae Opera Historica, published in 1896. Plummer gives five significant differences between the two:

1. In the m text, Bede asks for the prayers of his readers at the end of his preface; in the c text this comes at the end of the whole work.
2. Chapter 14 of book IV only appears in the m manuscripts.
3. There are three words in the m text near the beginning of book IV, chapter 18, which are omitted in the c text.
4. There is a variation between the texts in the annal for 731 given in the recapitulation at the end of the work; and in addition, the c text adds annals for 733 and 734 which do not appear in the m text.
5. The list of Bede's works in the c text omits his excerpts from Jerome on the prophets.

Colgrave, in his 1969 edition of the text, adds one more to this list, though he attributes this distinction to Plummer also:

6. The account of the miracles of St. Cuthbert in chapters 31 and 32 differs in that at the end of book IV, chapter 30, the m text uses "quaedam quae", where the c text has "unum quae"; the Latin in the c text implies only one miracle will be related, instead of the two that follow. In addition, the list of chapter headings in the c text has the headings for chapters 31 and 32 reversed.

The c text is now thought to be an earlier form of the work, since it is unlikely Bede (or any reviser) would have removed IV.14.

In Britain, only the c text circulated, whereas almost all the copies on the continent were of the m form.

== Important early manuscripts ==
There are three early manuscripts of the c text, and five of the m text, which are regarded as the basis of these versions of Bede's work. The letters at the start of each manuscript description are used by scholars to refer to the main manuscripts; these were mostly assigned by Plummer, with some modifications by Colgrave. The "CLA" number quoted refers to the Codices Latini Antiquiores, a published series of manuscripts that includes several of the Bede manuscripts.

The following are c text manuscripts.

- K. Kassel, Landesbibliothek 4° MS. theol. 2. CLA VIII, no. 1140. This manuscript omits books IV and V. It was written in a Northumbrian hand in the late 8th century. There is a pressmark on the cover, dating from the 15th century, indicating that it was owned by the abbey of Fulda in Hesse.
- C. London, British Library Cotton MS Tiberius C. II. CLA II, no. 191. Written in southern England in the second half of the 8th century. Plummer asserted that this was written in Durham, but Colgrave disputes this.
- O. Oxford, Bodleian Library MS. Hatton 43 (4106). Early 11th century.

The following are m text manuscripts.

- M. Cambridge, Cambridge University Library Kk. 5. 16. CLA II, no. 139. Written in Northumbria in about 737. A complete reproduction of this manuscript was published in 1959. The manuscript was owned by John Moore, the bishop of Ely, who died in 1714; it was purchased by King George I and donated to Cambridge University the following year.
- L. Saint Petersburg, Public Library Lat. Q. v. I. 18. CLA XI, no 1621. Dates from no later than 747; probably copied at Wearmouth or Jarrow. A reproduction of the manuscript was published in 1952. The text of L and M are very similar, though M has more errors; both may well have been copied from the same original, which may have been Bede's own copy.
- U. Wolfenbüttel, Herzog-August Bibliothek Weissenburg 34. CLA IX, no. 1385. Late 8th century; in an early Caroline minuscule hand. At one time it is known to have been at Weissenburg Abbey, Alsace.
- E. Würzburg, Universitätsbibliothek M. p. th. f. 118. From the second third of the 9th century; the hand is a Caroline minuscule which matches the hand used in Würzburg under Bishop Hunbert, who was bishop there from 832 to 842. In about 800, a list was made of books at Würzburg cathedral; the list included a Historia Anglorum and this may be a copy of that manuscript. At a later date the manuscript was owned by the abbey of Ebrach, about thirty miles east of Würzburg.
- N. Namur, Public Library, Fonds de la ville II. Written in the 9th century in the Ardennes by several scribes of varying skill. Manuscripts E and U are very similar; N is useful as a somewhat independent witness to their text.

== The m text in England ==
Only one manuscript of the m type remained in England.

- B. British Library, Cotton MS Tiberius A. xiv. CLA Suppl., no. 1703. Written in Northumbria in the middle of the 8th century. It is a copy of L. It was part of the Cotton Library, and was badly damaged in 1731 in a fire at Ashburnham House in London. There are two later additions at the start of I.7 which are also found in a group of c texts connected to Gloucester; see below.

== The c text in England ==
The numerous c text manuscripts in England can be assigned to groups with greater or lesser certainty according to the correspondences between the manuscripts, though how they are derived from the original is not always clear.

Two manuscripts may have direct lineal relationship with C:

- Cambridge, Trinity College R. 7. 5 (743). Mostly written in the early 11th century, though some leaves were rewritten in the 12th century. Colgrave suggests that this may be a direct copy of C, as the text is a very close match.
- Cambridge, St. John's College S. 6 (254). Some material from the Trinity College manuscript above appears in this text too, and it may be a descendant of that manuscript. It is signed by John Mablethorpe, who was a fellow of Lincoln College, Oxford, in the middle of the 15th century, and the manuscript may be in his hand.

=== Durham group ===
This group, so named by Plummer, consists of a manuscript from Durham cathedral and eight further manuscripts that are derived from it. The parent is:

- Durham Cathedral Library, B. ii. 35. Late 11th century.

The derived manuscripts are:

- British Library, Harley MS 4124. Written in the 12th century; it is known to have belonged to the Augustinian priory at Worksop in the 14th century; the priory was founded in about 1120.
- Cambridge, Pembroke College 82. A 12th-century copy from Tynemouth Priory, not far from Durham.
- British Library, Add MS 25014. Late 12th century. It belonged at one time to Newminster Abbey, founded in 1138; the manuscript contains a contemporary account of damage to the monastery done in 1333 by the Scots, during the Second War of Scottish Independence. There is also a note in the hand of John Bale bishop of Ossory from 1552; it subsequently belonged to the earls of Gosford.
- Vatican Library, Reginensis lat. 694. A 13th-century manuscript that was at one time in Coupar Angus Abbey.
- Oxford, Corpus Christi College 279. This is a 14th-century manuscript bound with an 11th-century copy of the Old English version of the history. The book was given to Corpus Christi by the antiquary Bryan Twyne in the 17th century, and it may have been Twyne who had the manuscript bound in this way.
- Edinburgh, National Library of Scotland, Advocates 18. 5. 1. 14th century. This manuscript is recorded in a 1506 catalogue of Exeter Cathedral's manuscripts. It belonged to John Parker, son of Matthew Parker; John Parker gave it to Richard Cosen in 1585. In 1629 it came into the hands of Sir James Balfour, and from there went to the Edinburgh Faculty of Advocates when the faculty acquired Balfour's manuscript collection.
- British Library, Burney MS 310. This is a copy made of Durham B. ii. 35 by Guillaume du Stiphel, a Breton scribe, in 1381. The manuscript was copied for Uthred of Boldon, who had been prior of Finchale Priory, near Durham.
- Oxford, Bodleian Library, MS. Bodl. 302 (2086). Early 15th century. It was owned in the 16th century by one George Hull, and subsequently was in the possession of the antiquary Thomas Allen, who gave it to the Bodleian Library.

=== Winchester group ===
This group consists of three manuscripts, the earliest of which is from Winchester.

- Winchester, Cathedral Library I. Early 11th century in multiple hands. Part of this manuscript was separated and is in the British Library as Cotton MS Tiberius D. iv. part ii, ff. 158–166. There is a note on the manuscript in a 14th-century hand which suggests it was in Winchester at that time, but its earlier history is unknown.
- Oxford, Bodleian Library, MS. Bodl. 163 (2016). Early 11th century. The manuscript was at Peterborough Abbey no later than the 12th century. There are two names on the manuscript: one is Humphrey Natures, a 16th-century monk at Peterborough; the other is Henry Stowkes, of whom nothing is known. John Barneston gave it to the Bodleian Library in 1605. It is likely that this is a transcript of the Winchester manuscript. It conforms in some respects with later copies, but may not be the source of those copies; see below.
- Oxford, Balliol College MS 176. This manuscript dates from the second half of the 12th century, and derives from the Winchester manuscript. Balliol acquired the manuscript as part of the library of William Grey, bishop of Ely, who died in 1478; its earlier history is not known.

=== Manuscripts of the c text containing the miracle of St. Oswald ===
One of the distinguishing marks of the c text is the omission of IV.14, which tells of a miracle performed by St Oswald. However, by the end of the 11th century the missing chapter had been recovered from an m text manuscript. The following groups of manuscripts are all of c type but contain IV.14.

==== Gloucester group ====
This group shares with B, above, a pair of additions to the text.

- British Library, Royal MS 13 C. v. Dates from the second half of the 11th century; in multiple hands. The manuscript is missing the last leaf. There are two ex-libris marks: that of Gloucester Abbey, and also that of Richard Hanley, abbot there from 1457 to 1472.
- Oxford, Bodleian Library, MS. Douce 368. An early 12th-century copy from Winchcomb Abbey, near Gloucester. Bede's text is followed by a life of St. Kenelm, the patron saint of the abbey; hence the copy was probably made for Winchcomb. Colgrave obtained both this manuscript and Royal MS 13 C. v, and compared them to determine if it were a copy of the British Library manuscript, but was unable to find any evidence to settle the question.
- Aberystwyth, National Library of Wales, Peniarth 381. First half of the 12th century; the manuscript has been damaged, apparently by rats. There is a pressmark which has not been identified, and the manuscript also has two signatures: John Canon and Clement Burdett, both of whom owned the manuscript after the dissolution of the monasteries.
- Oxford, New College 308. A late 12th-century manuscript.
- Oxford, Pembroke College 3. Also late 12th century, but the manuscript is missing much material. Nothing is known of its history; it is signed in three places with a 17th-century name, "Anthonye Cole of Cadwych".
- Oxford, Bodleian Library, MS. Barlow 39 (6462). A 13th-century manuscript missing the first thirteen leaves; also missing a leaf after f. 39. Plummer believed this was a copy of the Winchcomb manuscript, MS. Douce 368, above. The origin of this manuscript is unknown.

==== Other manuscripts ====
Other copies that include the chapter on St Oswald exist, but for the relationships with other manuscripts are more obscure.

- Oxford, Bodleian Library, MS. Laud Misc. 243. First half of the 12th century; multiple scribes. The chapter recording the miracle of St Oswald is marked out with a heading that makes it clear the intention was for the chapter to be read out loud.
- British Library, Stowe MS 104. Dates from the end of the 12th century.
- London, College of Arms. This copy is from the second half of the 12th century; it bears a pressmark from Chichester Cathedral.
- British Library, Add MS 14250. From the late 12th or early 13th century. The manuscript is marked with the ex libris of Plympton Priory; there are annals dealing with Plympton affairs which follow Bede's text.

=== Yorkshire group ===
This group is identified by the omission of the text from part way through V.24 onwards; the manuscript from which these manuscripts derive was presumably damaged or unfinished.

- Cambridge, Trinity College R. 5. 27 (722). An early 12th-century manuscript with the first quire missing. It has been suggested that it is a Canterbury manuscript but Colgrave comments that this is unsupported. The name "Robert Cherwell" was written on one leaf in the 16th century, but nothing is known of its history.
- Oxford, Bodleian Library, MS. Fairfax 12 (3892). A 12th-century copy with an ex libris mark from Selby Abbey in Yorkshire.
- Oxford, Lincoln College lat. 31. Mid-12th century. The manuscript was once owned by Robert Flemmyng, the dean of Lincoln Cathedral; Flemmyng left his library to the college when he died in 1483.
- Oxford, St. John's College 99. Second half of the 12th century. This copy has the ex libris of Jervaulx Abbey, which was founded in 1156.
- British Library, Add MS 38817. Second half of the 12th century. This manuscript was owned by Kirkham Priory, which was founded in about 1122. From the table of contents it is possible to see that the manuscript was at one time accompanied by other texts which are also found with the St. John's manuscript, above; the two manuscripts are evidently connected in some way.
- London, College of Arms, Arundel MS 16. An early 14th-century copy which is now incomplete.
- British Library, Burney MS 297. From the 14th century. There is a short addition by the scribe which matches that on the Kirkham Priory copy, above; Colgrave suggests that this is therefore a copy of that manuscript.
- H. L. Bradfer-Lawrence. A copy was privately owned by the antiquarian Harry Lawrence Bradfer-Lawrence; it was a 14th-century manuscript that had been previously at Ripley Castle, and which originally came from Fountains Abbey.
- Oxford, Bodleian Library, MS. Rawl. C. 162. From the late 14th or early 15th century. The manuscript was once owned by John Newton, who was treasurer of York; he left it to York Minster in his will, in 1414. A Bertram Stote, of Newcastle upon Tyne, owned it in the early 18th century.
- Cambridge, Fitzwilliam Museum, McClean 109. 15th century. It was owned by William Dadyngton of Barton-upon-Humber who left it to Lincoln Cathedral in his will. It was also owned by Thomas Fairfax, Lord Fairfax; and by John Thoresby of Leeds, both in the late 17th century. Colgrave suggests that the manuscript may be connected to MS Fairfax 12, above. In the 19th century the manuscript was part of the collection of Thomas Phillipps.

There are also four copies recorded in medieval catalogues that may have been related to this group. These are:

- A copy at Bridlington recorded in the 13th century
- A copy at Rievaulx, also recorded in the 13th century
- A copy at the Austin Friars in York, noted in the 14th century
- A 15th-century copy recorded in 1453 as having been owned by William Duffield, a canon of York, Southwark and Beverley, who died in that year.

=== Southern text ===
These manuscripts are described by Colgrave as representing "the common text of southern England in the later Middle Ages". It is characterized by several changes made to the manuscripts; Colgrave gives several examples from chapters in book I of the text. This group falls into two parts, with each set characterized by commonalities in the text.

==== Digby group ====
The first set, named the "Digby group", consists of:

- Hereford Cathedral P. v. 1. A fragment of this manuscript is separated and is in Bodleian MS. E Museo 93 (3632). Early 12th century. It was annotated by John Price in the 16th century, and later that century was owned by Walter Herbert. On f. 116 an omission has been corrected using Bodleian MS. Laud. misc. 243.
- Oxford, Magdalen College lat. 105. A mid-12th-century copy of unknown history; see the Bury St. Edmunds manuscript below in this list.
- Oxford, Bodleian Library, MS. Digby 211 (1812). From the second half of the 12th century. The manuscript bears the ex libris of Waltham Abbey, which was founded in 1177.
- Cambridge, St. John's College B. 5 (27). A 14th-century copy which at one time belonged to the college at Pleshey, in Essex.
- Oxford Bodleian Library, MS. Digby 101 (1702). Early 14th century.
- Cambridge, Trinity College R. 5. 22 (717), part 1. A 14th-century copy.
- Oxford, Merton College 95 (K. 3. 6). A 14th-century copy which is truncated part way through V.20. Merton College received it in the will of Robert Ketrynham in 1374.
- Oxford, Bodleian Library, Tanner 348 (10,175). A 15th-century manuscript that contains a list of archbishops of Canterbury found also in British Library MS. Stowe 104.
- Oxford, All Souls College 31. 15th century.
- Bury St. Edmunds, Cathedral Library. 15th century. It was given to Syon Abbey in 1490; in 1575 it was in the possession of Augustine Stywarde, who gave it to the church library in Bury. It shares several lines of verse with Oxford, Magdalen College lat. 105, above.

Colgrave suggests that a manuscript known to have been given to Pembroke College, Cambridge by Hugh Damlett in 1476 was probably in this group also.

==== Rochester group ====
The second group is characterised by, among other things, the inclusion of an Old English text on the resting places of English saints (known as the Secgan). It consists of:

- British Library, Harley MS 3680. Early 12th century. This was probably written at Rochester. The manuscript is listed in a Rochester catalogue in 1202. Colgrave suggests that this might be the parent of all the manuscripts that include the text on the resting places of the saints.
- Oxford, Bodleian Library, MS. e Museo 115 (3537). A 12th-century manuscript missing a leaf at the start and several at the end. It finishes part way through V.21. The same John Prise who owned Hereford Cathedral P. v. 1 also wrote a note on this manuscript.
- Dublin, Trinity College E. 2. 23 (492). Second half of the 12th century. This manuscript comes from Bury St Edmunds Abbey.
- Oxford, Christ Church 99. From the first half of the 14th century. A 15th-century name, "Thomas Spaine", is written on the inside of the cover.
- Cambridge, Trinity College R. 7. 3. Early 14th century. The binding is decorated with a coat of arms, which Colgrave was unable to identify.
- British Library, Arundel MS 74. Late 14th century. This contains the coat of arms of Henry le Despenser, who was the bishop of Norwich from 1370 to 1406.

Three others in this group may be listed separately; one is now lost, and the other two are less closely related to the manuscripts listed above.

- Oxford, Merton College. Merton still owns one copy of Bede in Merton College 95 (K. 3. 6), listed above in the Digby group, but at one time, according to a catalogue, it owned another copy. John Leland, the 16th-century antiquary, asserted that a Merton manuscript contained the text concerning the resting places of the saints. That text was never a part of the remaining manuscript, so it is likely to have been the other. That manuscript would have fallen into this group.
- Oxford, Bodleian Library, MS. Holkham misc. 7. In a late 15th-century hand. Once owned by the Earl of Leicester and kept at his library at Holkham Hall.
- Worcester Cathedral F. 148. Second half of the 14th century. Twenty two quires of this book are now lost, including Bede's text up to the end of I.14. There are two further gaps in the manuscript, of one leaf and six leaves.

=== Uncertain lineage ===
Several English manuscripts, though clearly c texts, have not been placed in relationship to the other surviving manuscripts. These include:

- British Library, Add MS 38130. Dates from the 12th century. Bought by Sir Thomas Phillipps in 1859 from Guglielmo Libri; its earlier history is unknown. Colgrave suggests it may be related to British Library Stowe MS 104; see below.
- Oxford, Bodleian Library, MS. Bodl. 712 (2619). Written and illuminated to the instructions of Robert Wyvill, a 14th-century bishop of Salisbury. This contains an early form of the c text despite the relatively late date at which it was copied.
- British Library, Royal MS 13 C. VII. Late 14th century. This was owned by a 14th-century Carmelite, Robert Ivory, who, before he died (some time after 1390) gave it to the London house of Carmelites.
- Phillipps MS. 9428. A 15th-century copy of little apparent interest, but which Plummer notes contains a mention of the home of James the Deacon, near Catterick, as having been "Seynt Iemestret". Plummer comments that "the scribe probably had local knowledge".
- Cambridge, Corpus Christi College 264. 14th century. The volume belonged to Simon Bozoun, the prior of Norwich from 1344 to 1352.
- Cambridge, Corpus Christi College 359. 14th century.
- Cambridge, Emmanuel College I. 1. 3 (3). Dated 1481. This copy belonged to John Gunthorpe, the dean of Wells.
- Cambridge, Sidney Sussex College Δ. 2. 8 (30), part ii. Late 14th century. In 1592 it belonged to John Pilkington, a canon of Durham.
- Cambridge, Sidney Sussex College Δ. 5. 17 (102). 15th century. From Bury St Edmunds Abbey. An oddity in the manuscript is that near the end Bede's text is interrupted mid-sentence and a text on chronology (from 1108) has been inserted, after which the text resumes the interrupted sentence and continues to the end.
- British Library, Cotton MS Vitellius E. i. Two leaves of this manuscript are separated and are now in Cotton MS Vitellius E. vii. 12th century. This may derive from Gisborough Priory. The manuscript was owned at one time by Henry Savile of Banke, and passed into the Cotton Collection, where it was severely damaged in the Ashburnham House fire in 1731.

== Manuscripts not clearly of m or c type ==
Other manuscripts exist that cannot be traced to the m or c texts.

- New York, Pierpont Morgan Library M 826. CLA XI, no. 1662. This consists of only a single leaf; the text is part of book III, chapters 29–30. The writing is of the late 8th century. The manuscript was owned by Thomas Phillipps, the antiquary. It is possible that the leaf comes from a copy known to have been at Arras in the 11th century; the copy was still at Arras in 1718 but may have been destroyed by a librarian in the 19th century who was said to have sold a third of the manuscripts there to bookbinders.
- Bern, Burgerbibliothek 363. This contains part of book I of the text, and is included in a 9th-century collection of manuscripts.
- Oxford, Bodleian Library MS. Laud misc. 610. Contains a partial translation of books I and II into Old Irish.
- British Library, Egerton MS 3278. A single leaf, dated to the early 11th century, containing parts of V.19–20. Previously owned by the Wellcome Historical Medical Museum.

A record survives in a catalogue of Glastonbury manuscripts from 1247 of a copy titled Historiae Anglorum scriptae a Beda, but it is not known what became of it.

== Sources ==
- Atherton, Ian (1996). Norwich Cathedral: church, city, and diocese, 1096–1996. Continuum. ISBN 1-85285-134-1.
- Bede (1969). Colgrave, Bertram and R.A.B. Mynors (ed.). Bede's Ecclesiastical History of the English People. Oxford.
- Bede (1896). Plummer, Charles (ed.). Baedae Opera Historica. Oxford.
- Thomson, Rodney M. (1989). Catalogue of the manuscripts of Lincoln Cathedral Chapter Library. Boydell & Brewer. ISBN 0-85991-278-7.
