= Bower of Taste =

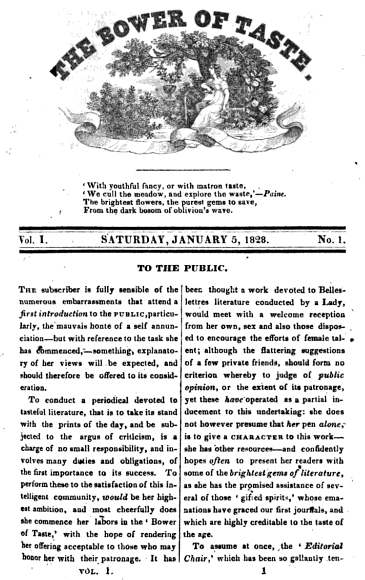
Bower of Taste v.1, no.1, 1828

The Bower of Taste (1828–1830) was a 19th-century American periodical edited by Katherine Augusta Ware (Note: Katharine Augusta Rhodes Ware (1797-1843) was a writer and editor in Boston. Born in Quincy, Massachusetts, to Dr. Rhodes, she married "Charles A. Ware, U.S. Navy" in 1819. In 1839 she "removed to Europe ... and remained there until her death, at Paris, in 1843.") in Boston, Massachusetts. Contributors included Albert Pike, Thomas Edwards and Margaret Snow." The bi-weekly magazine ceased in May 1830. (Note: The magazine began with v.1, no.1 (Jan. 5, 1828) and ended with v.3, no.11 (May 29, 1830).)

== History ==
The magazine evolved from a previous publication, the Spectator and Ladies' Album published in Boston by Ingraham & Hewes. The publishers "announced on December 29, 1827, that their paper would appear the following week in a new form under the management of Mrs. Katherine Ware, and be called in the future the Bower of Taste." "The Bower printed theatrical notes, and its idea of 'Belles-lettres literature' was the usual Gothic, Oriental, or sentimental tale, and imitation of an 18th-century essay, and a tinkling or sonorous reminiscence of [Thomas] Moore or Byron."

Weekly (then bi-weekly after 1828) issues of The Bower included, for instance:

- "Tales: 'The Mysterious Bridal; 'The Magician's Visiter.'"
- "Essays copied from British magazines, such as 'The Character of Byron,' by Walter Scott."
- "Polite essays and sketches in the manner of Addison and Irving: 'On Genius;' 'The Reminscences of a Dandyzette.'"
- "Anecdotes garnered from the British press."
- "Literary notes. Marriages and Deaths."
- "Light editorials: Thanks given that present modes have little tendency to disguise the human form; like artists, people of taste wish to preserve the outline of nature as distinctly as possible 'with due reference to delicacy.'"
- "Poetry: translation of 'L'Imitation,' from a Paris paper, 'Le Diable Boiteux.' 'Cupid and Venus.' 'To Sarah on a Faded Rose in a Volume of Anacreon.'"

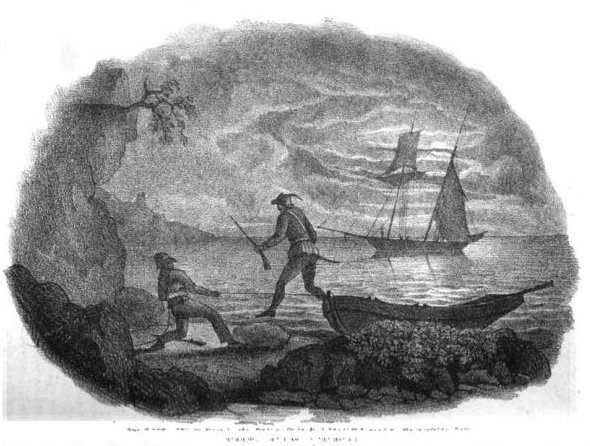
Illustration by Thomas Edwards for prize-winning story "The Pirates, or ... Errors of Public Justice," Bower of Taste, Feb. 1828. Ware awarded the author a copy of the works of Robert Treat Paine

Representative was a review of an 1828 production of King Lear at Boston's newly established Tremont Theatre, starring Junius Brutus Booth. "This gentleman is a true disciple of nature's school in every part he assumes. In those scenes where the noble energies of the mind seemed struggling with infirmities of age, he was inimitable. ... We regret that Mrs. Parker should have been appointed to sustain the part of Goneril. She is a pretty woman, but wholly unequal to that task." Some issues featured word games, such as the logogriph published February 9, 1828. Will Shortz explains: "in a logogriph, clues were given for a keyword, from which various letters were selected to make new, shorter words that answered other clues."

Ware commissioned engraved illustrations for some issues. "We have at considerable additional expense, presented in our last volume, four plates, all expressly designed and executed for our paper, and the encouragement offered by the public, the same number will be furnished for the ensuing year." "Typical of the plates in this magazine are the 'Insane Hospital' drawn by Mrs. Margaret Snow and "The Pirates" drawn by Thomas Edwards. Lithographs by Mrs. Snow were praised in The Bower of Taste for the 'peculiar softness in her style, a smoothness in the gradations of light and shadow, that give her prints the appearance of finished engravings.'"

Some literary historians have seen The Bower of Taste as lacking in innovation, and editorially conservative. For example: "Mrs. Ware ... offered Boston readers a chaste retreat from a vulgar world. Correct stories, character sketches, literary notices, conservative comment on fashion, some paragraphs about the Boston state, and a poetical section called 'The Recess of the Muses' made up the contents. ... The little periodical was, apparently, too delicately sensitive for a work-a-day world and soon left the field to more robust adventurers."

Although The Bower ceased in May 1830, it was "continued" by another periodical with a new title and editor. "The Amateur is the successor of the Bower of Taste. Mr. [Frederic S.] Hill, the present editor, will, undoubtedly, make the publication what he proposes -- 'a magazine of amusement.'"

== Gallery ==
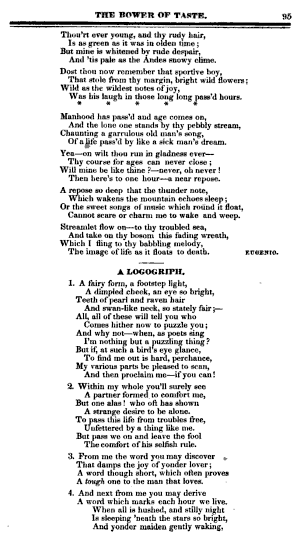
Logogriph, Bower of Taste, Feb. 9, 1828

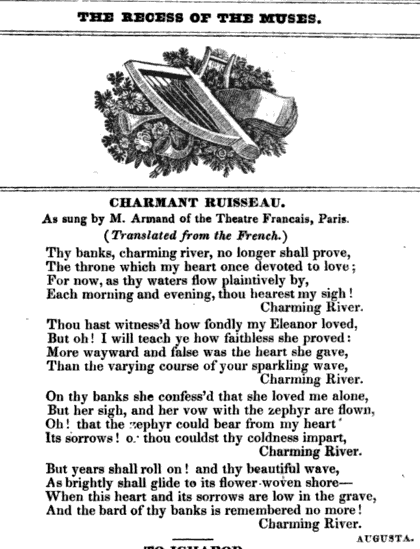
From Bower of Taste, Feb. 16, 1828 issue

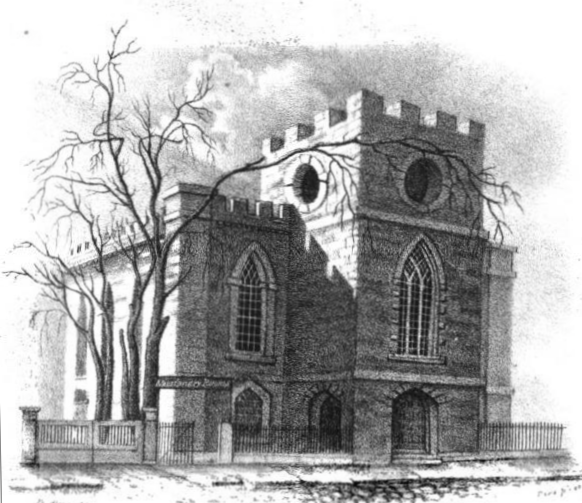
Hanover Church, Boston; Bower of Taste, March 1828

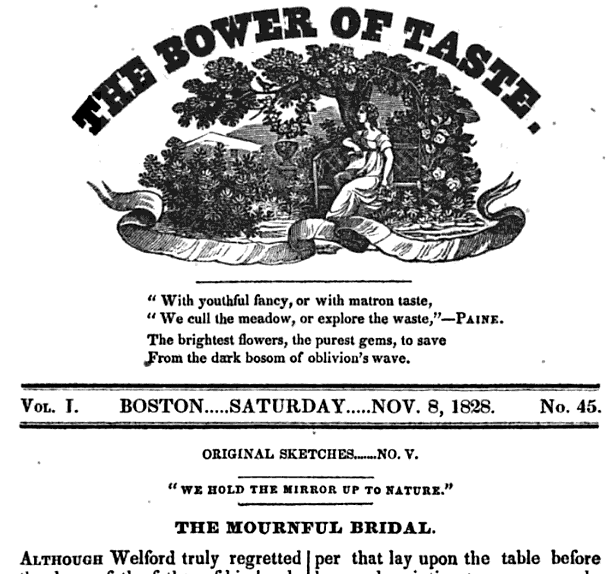
Detail of "The Mournful Bridal," in Bower of Taste v.1, no.45, November 8, 1828

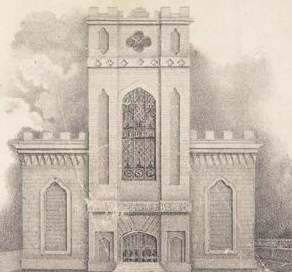
Illustration of the newly constructed Trinity Church building, Summer St., Boston, in Bower of Taste, ca.1829. Drawn by Margaret Clark Snow; printed by Annin & Smith
