= Sylloge =

Sylloge, from the Ancient Greek συλλογή ("collection"), is a compilation of documents or data. In particular the term may refer to:

- Sylloge Nummorum Graecorum, a project publishing collections of ancient Greek coins
- Sylloge of Coins of the British Isles, a similar project for British coinage of the Anglo-Saxons and Normans
- Lombard syllogae, Anglo-Saxon compilations of inscriptions from Lombard Italy
- Syllogae minores, compilations of ancient Greek poetry
