= Logogriph =

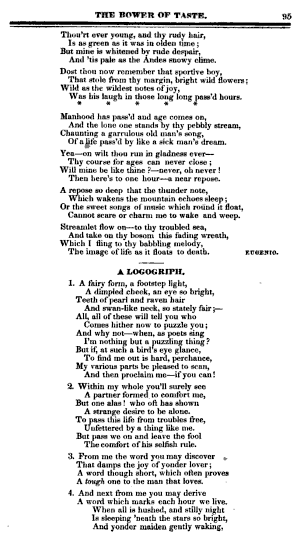
A logogriph published in Bower of Taste (February 9, 1828)

A logogriph (not to be confused with logogram or logograph) is a form of word puzzle based on the component letters of a key word to be identified, and is derived from Greek λόγος, a word, and γρίφος, a riddle or fishing basket. It generally involves anagrams or other wordplay treatments such as addition, subtraction, omission, or substitution of a letter, and is sometimes arranged in the form of a verse giving hints to the word. The term logogriph is also used for the puzzle type in which a pair of anagrams must be deduced from synonyms (e.g. YELLOW FISH would lead to the answer AMBER BREAM).

The following example of a logogriph created by Lord Macaulay refers to the word COD:

Cut off my head, how singular I act!
Cut off my tail, and plural I appear.
Cut off my head and tail--most curious fact,
Although my middle's left, there's nothing there!
What is my head cut off?--a sounding sea!
What is my tail cut off?--a flowing river!
Amid their mingling depths I fearless play
Parent of softest sounds, though mute for ever!

In explanation, cut off COD’s head and it becomes OD (i.e. odd, or singular); cut off its tail, and it becomes CO (company, plurality); cut off both to leave O (nothing, emptiness); the head of the word is the letter C, which sounds like SEA; the tail is D, which sounds like the River Dee, and COD itself may play in the depths of both.

Logogriphs were among the word puzzles popularised by The Masquerade, an English puzzle publication appearing over several volumes from 1797. Here a cryptic reference to the key word would be given, followed by clues to other words comprising some of its letters. For example, one logogriph appeared in The Masquerade on the word SPEAR, which includes the letters of APE, SPAR, REAP, ASP and so forth. Logogriphs were often rather long-winded, as clues had to be given to each of the component words.

Orhan Pamuk’s The Black Book refers to the use of logogriphs as a means of evading press censorship.
