= De natura rerum (Bede) =

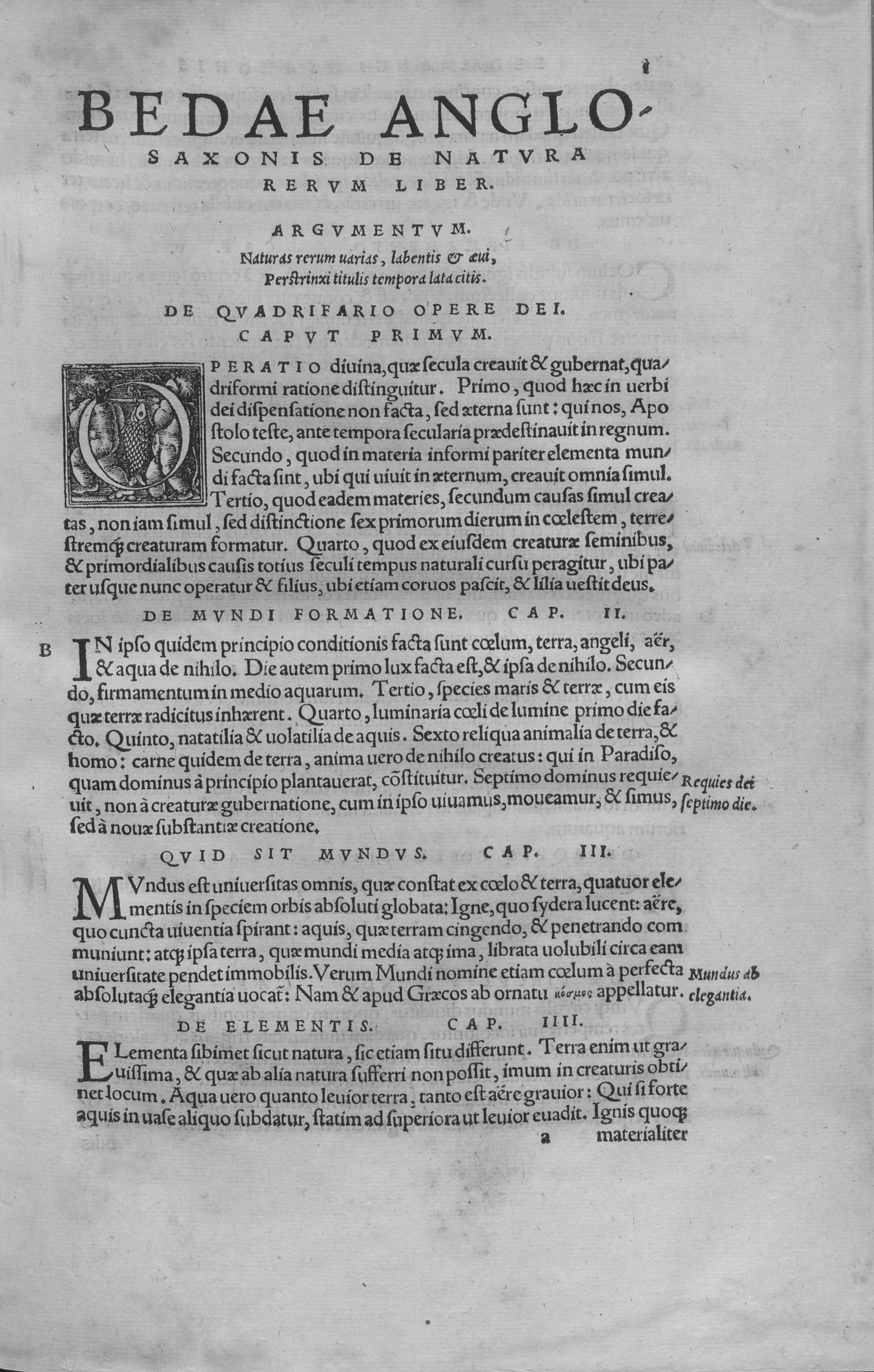
De natura rerum, 1529 edition

De natura rerum ("on the nature of things") is a treatise by the Anglo-Saxon monk Bede, composed in 703 as a companion-piece to his De temporibus ('on times'). In the view of Eoghan Ahern, 'though it is an early work that does not approach the complexity and innovation of Bede's later thought, DNR provides us with an insight into the cosmological assumptions that undergird his understanding of theology and history'.

== Contents ==
The work comprises fifty-one short chapters with titles such as:

1. De Quadrifario dei opere (on the fourfold work of God)
2. De mundi formatione (on the formation of the earth)
3. Quid sit mundus (what the world is)
4. De elementis (on the elements)
5. De firmamento (on heaven)
6. De varia altitudine cœli (on the differing height of the sky)
7. De cœlo superiore (on the upper sky)
8. De aquis cœlestibus (on the celestial waters)
9. De quinque circulis mundi (on the five circles of the earth)
10. De plagis mundi (on the climes of the earth)
11. De stellis (on the stars)
12. De cursu planetarum (on the course of the planets)
13. De ordine eorum (on their arrangement)

For example, chapter 3, 'Quid sit mundus' ('what the world is') runs:

Mundus est universitas omnis, quæ constat ex cœlo et terra, quatuor elementis in speciem orbis absoluti globata: igne, quo sidera lucent; aere, quo cuncta viventia spirant: aquis, quæ terram cingendo et penetrando communiunt: atque ipsa terra, quæ mundi media atque ima, librata volubili circa eam universitate pendet immobilis.

The world is the whole of everything, which is constituted by the sky and the land, the four elements in the form of a completely rounded sphere: fire, by which the stars shine; air, which all living things breathe; waters, which surround the land, encircling and penetrating; and the land itself, which is the middle and core of the world, hanging unmoving, with everything turning in equilibrium around it.

== Translations ==
- Bede, On the Nature of Things and On Times, trans. by Calvin B. Kendall and Faith Wallis, Translated Texts for Historians, 56 (Liverpool: Liverpool University Press, 2010), ISBN 9781846314957
