= Abbot of Monkwearmouth–Jarrow =

This is a list of abbots of Monkwearmouth–Jarrow Abbey. Wearmouth–Jarrow is a twin-foundation English monastery, located on the River Wear in Sunderland and the River Tyne at Jarrow respectively, in the Kingdom of Northumbria.

== Abbots ==
Whilst they were independent monasteries, they each had an abbot.

Jarrow	Monkwearmouth
-	Benedict Biscop (674–681)
Ceolfrid (682–690)	Eosterwine (682–686)
Ceolfrid (682–690)	Sigfrith (686 – 690)
Ceolfrid (690 – 716/7)
Hwaetberht (716/7–740s)
Cuthbert (c. 764)
Ethelbald (c. 800)	Fridwin (c. 800)
Aldwin (1074)	Elfwin (app. c. 1075)
-	Aldwin (1075)

Abbey removed to Durham, 1083

== As a cell of Durham ==
During this time, the two monasteries each had a master.

Masters of Jarrow	Masters of Wearmouth
Ralph of Midelham, occ. before 1303	-
Thomas de Castro, procurator, 1313	-
William of Harton, 1313	-
William of Thirsk (Treks), 1313	-
Geoffrey of Haxeby, 1313	-
William of Harton, 1314	-
Robert of Durham, 1321	Robert of Durham, 1321
Emeric de Lumley, 1326	
Alexander of Lamesley, 1333	
Emeric de Lumley, 1338	Alan of Marton, 1337
John of Beverley, 1340	
Thomas de Graystanes, 1344	Hugh of Wodeburn, 1343
John of Goldisburgh, 1350	John of Neuton, 1349
John of Norton, 1350—	
Richard of Bikerton, 1355	
John of Goldisburgh, 1357	
John Abell, 1358	John of Shafto, 1360
	Richard of Bekyngham, 1360
John of Elwick, 1363	
Richard of Segbroke,	
John of Tikhill, 1367	John of Neuton, 1367
John of Bolton, 1369	John of Bishopton, 1369
John de Lumley, 1370	
William Vavasour, 1373	
John de Lumley, 1376	
Thomas Legat, 1381	John Aklyff, 1387
	Thomas Launcells, 1388
	Thomas Legat, 1395
	William of Cawood, 1399
	John of Hutton, 1400
Walter of Teesdale, 1402	
Thomas of Lyth, app. 3 October 1408	John Repon, app. 14 June 1409
Walter of Teesdale, app. 1410	
Robert of Masham, 1411	
John Moreby, 1415	Thomas of Witton, app. 17 June 1413
Robert Masham, 1417	
William Graystanes, 1419	
John Moreby, 1422	
Thomas Moreby, 1424	Thomas Moreby, 1425
John Durham the younger, 1431	Robert Moreby, 1430
	William Lyham, app. 14 June 1435
	Thomas Bradebery, 1446
John Barlay, app. 15 April 1443	
John Mody, sacr. pag. prof., app. 1 September 1446	
John Bradebery, app. 2 April 1452	John Midelham, 1452
Thomas Warde, app. 1457	Richard Blakburn, 1456
	John Bradbery, app. 1458
Thomas Hexham, app. 23 July 1467	John Auckland, 1466
	Richard Wrake, app. 5 May 1470; recalled, 29 May 1471
	Robert West, app. 29 May 1471
Richard Wrake, app. 28 May 1476	
Robert Werdale, app. 10 November 1477	
Robert Knowt, 1479	
Robert Billingham, 1480	William Cuthbert, 1482
	William Chambre, (fn. 108) 1486
John Swan, 1489	William Cauthorne, 1490
Robert Billingham, 1493	William Cuthbert, app. 1491
John Hamsterley, app. 31 May 1495	Richard Evenwood, app. 1497
Henry Dalton, 1500	Henry Dalton, app. 24 May 1501
John Danby, 1503	
	Robert Stroder, app. 1506
William Hawkwell, 1517	Richard Evenwood, app. 31 May 1513
	John Swalwell, 1526
John Swalwell, 1531	Richard Heryngton, 1533
