= St Peter's Church, Monkwearmouth =

Coordinates: 54.913030°N 1.375245°W

St Peter's Church, Monkwearmouth, Sunderland
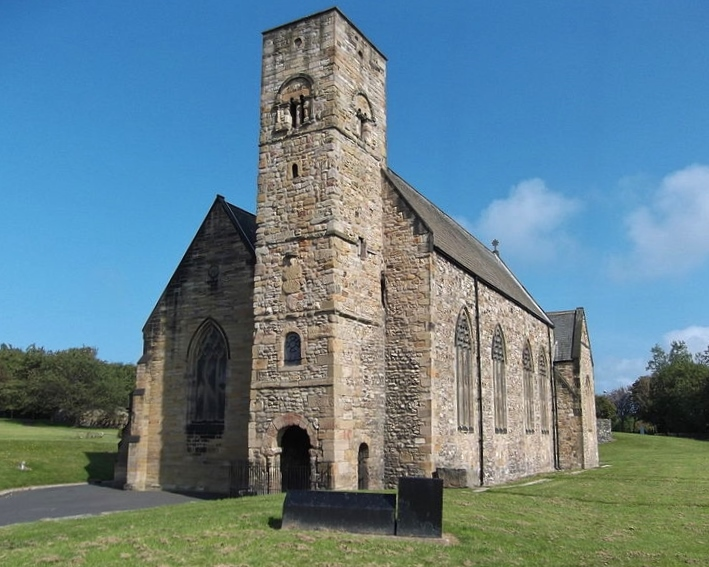
- St Peter's church seen from west-southwest

- Location within Tyne and Wear
- OS grid reference: NZ 40168 57781
- Location: Monkwearmouth, Tyne and Wear
- Country: England
- Denomination: Church of England
- Website: Parish of Monkwearmouth

History
- Status: parish church
- Dedication: Saint Peter

Architecture
- Functional status: Active
- Heritage designation: Grade I listed
- Designated: 8 May 1950
- Style: Anglo-Saxon, Decorated Gothic, Gothic Revival
- Years built: 7th, 10th, 14th & 19th centuries

Specifications
- Materials: rubble masonry

Administration
- Province: York
- Diocese: Diocese of Durham
- Archdeaconry: Sunderland

St Peter's Church, Monkwearmouth is the parish church of Monkwearmouth in Sunderland, Tyne and Wear, England. It is one of three churches in the Parish of Monkwearmouth. The others are the Victorian All Saints' Church, Monkwearmouth and the Edwardian St Andrew's Church, Roker.

St Peter's was founded in AD 674–5 as one of the two churches of the Benedictine double monastery of Monkwearmouth–Jarrow Abbey. The other church is St Paul's Church, Jarrow. St Peter's is a Grade I listed building and part of a scheduled monument.

== Architecture ==
=== Anglo-Saxon ===
The original church on the site was built at the behest of Benedict Biscop in AD 674–75, when the area was part of the Anglo-Saxon Kingdom of Northumbria. Bede (circa 673–735) wrote that Benedict brought stonemasons and glassworkers from Gaul to build the church, as these crafts were not yet established in Anglo-Saxon England.

Of Benedict's building only the west wall and porch survive. The ground floor of the porch is barrel vaulted. Its outer arch, at the west end of the porch, is of elaborate design and decorated with stone reliefs.

By about AD 700 the porch had been enlarged by the addition of a second storey and north and south porticus, forming a westwork. By the end of the 10th century further storeys had been added to the porch, raising its height to form the present west tower.

=== Gothic and Gothic Revival ===
The rest of the church is much later. The north aisle was first built in the 13th century. A five-light east window was inserted in the chancel in the 14th century.

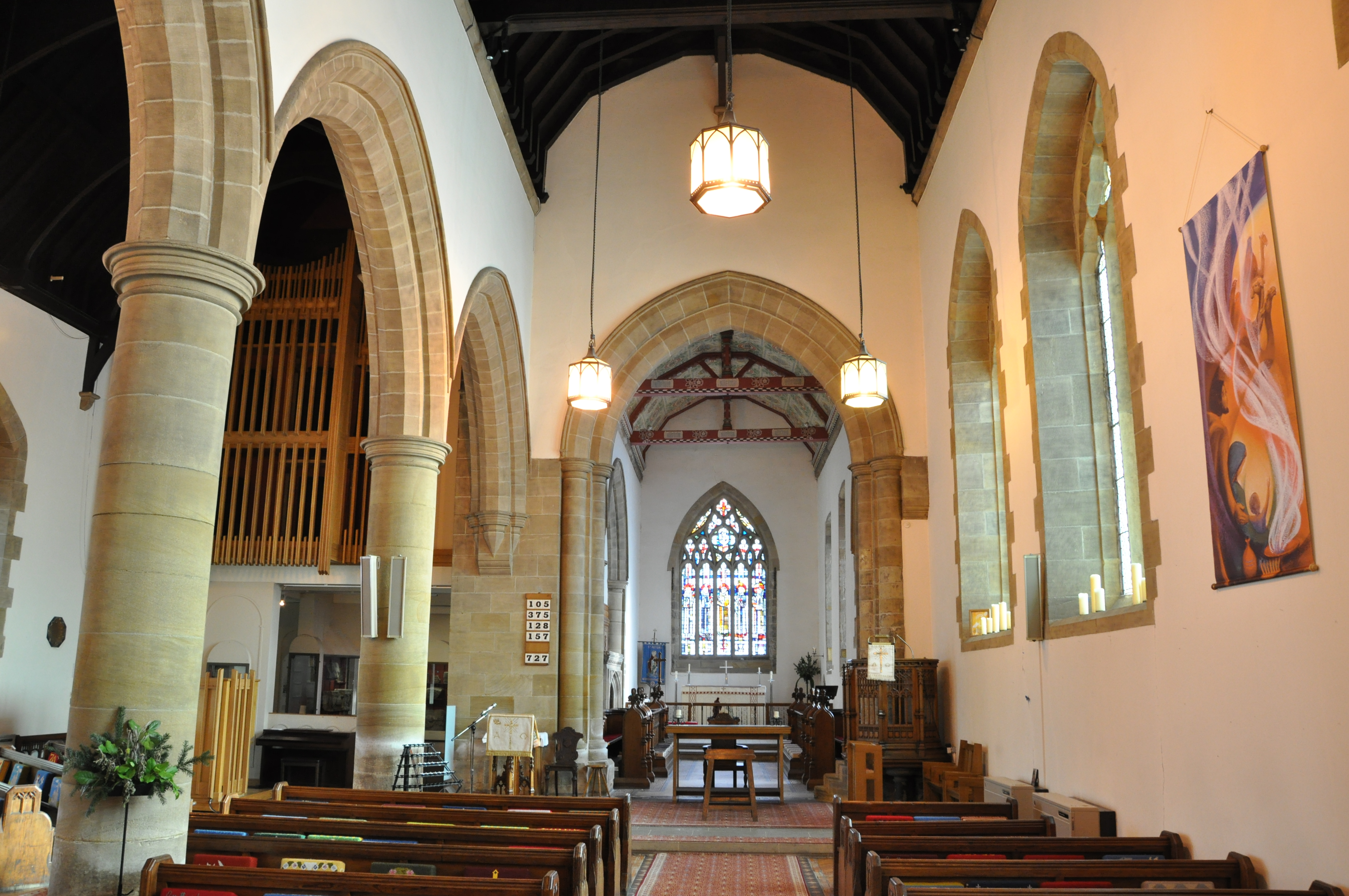
Inside the nave, looking east to the chancel

Early in the 19th century the arcade of the north aisle and most of the chancel arch were removed, and galleries were inserted.

In 1875–76 St Peter's was restored under the direction of the architects Hubert Austin and RJ Johnson, who had the north aisle rebuilt and the east window of the chancel replaced. There is also an organ loft built onto the north side of the chancel.

=== 20th century ===
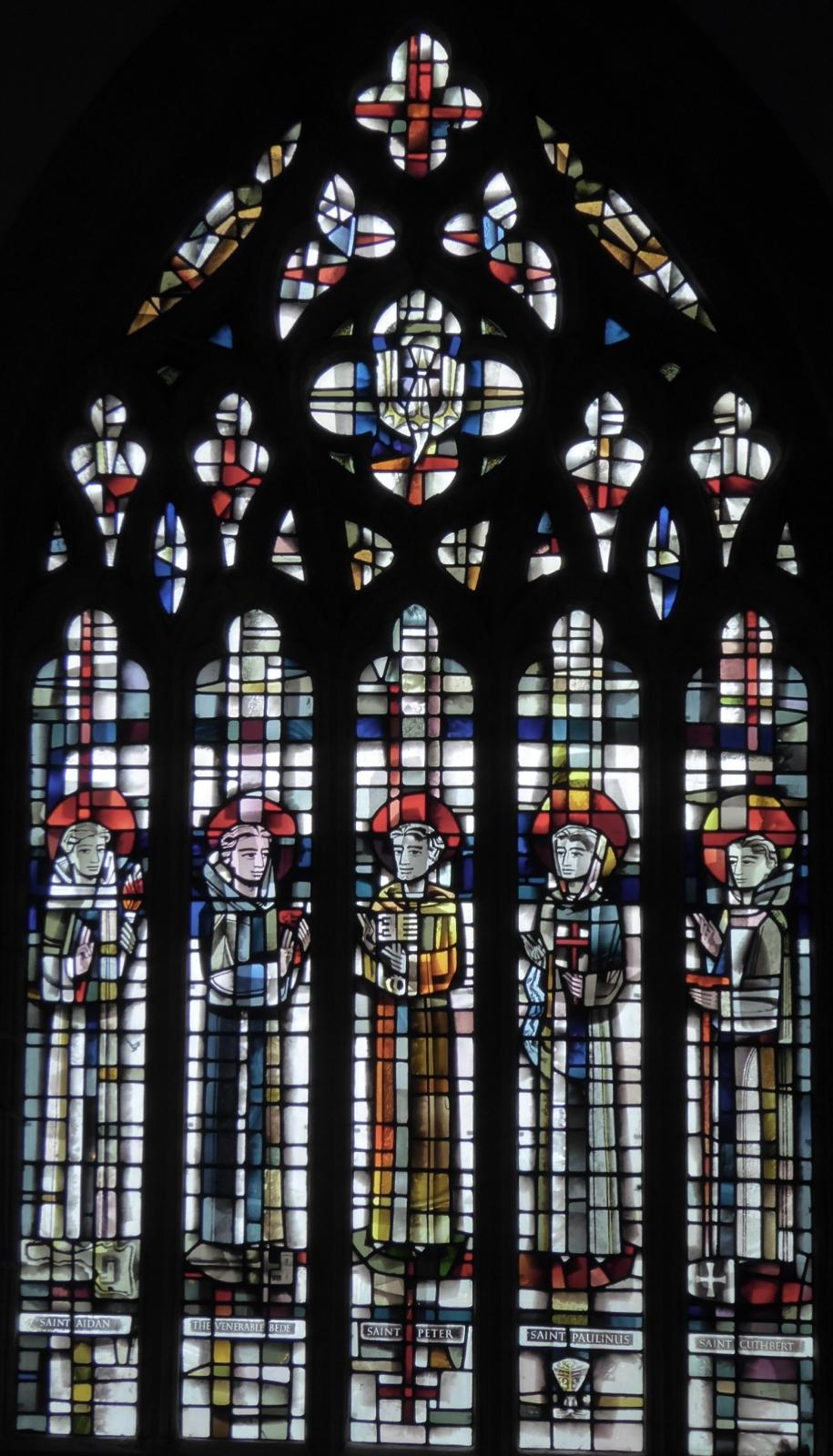
East chancel window by Leonard Evetts

The stained glass in the east chancel wall and north aisle was installed in St Peter's in 1969, replacing glass lost during bombing raids on Sunderland during the Second World War. It was designed and manufactured by the Newcastle-based stained glass artist Leonard Evetts and depicts a variety of northern saints. Evetts' work can also be seen in St Paul's Church, Jarrow, the companion to St Peter's as successor to the dual monastic establishment of Monkwearmouth-Jarrow Abbey.

In 1973 an octagonal extension was added east of the organ loft as an interpretation centre. In 1984 the church was damaged by fire, and about 1985 the interior and roof were rebuilt.

== Bibliography ==
- Blair, Peter Hunter (1977) [1956]. An Introduction to Anglo-Saxon England (2nd ed.). Cambridge and London: Cambridge University Press. p. 154. ISBN 0-521-29219-0.
- Johnson, Margot (1992). "Monkwearmouth (St. Peter)". Durham: Historic and University City and surrounding area (6th ed.). Durham: Turnstone Ventures. p. 39. ISBN 978-0946105090.
- Page, William, ed. (1907). "Saxon Houses: including Wearmouth and Jarrow". A History of the County of Durham. Victoria County History. Vol. II. Westminster: Archibald Constable & Co. pp. 79–85.
- Pevsner, Nikolaus; Williamson, Elizabeth (revision) (1983) [1953]. County Durham. The Buildings of England (2nd ed.). Harmondsworth: Penguin Books. pp. 465–467. ISBN 0-14-071009-4.
