= Hwætberht =

8th-century abbot

Hwætberht (died 740s) was abbot of Monkwearmouth-Jarrow Priory, where he had served as a monk.

== Life ==
He was elected to succeed Abbot Ceolfrith in 716 or 717 when Ceolfrith set off on a pilgrimage to Rome. Bede reports that Hwætberht had himself made a pilgrimage to Rome, "and had stayed there a good long while, learning, copying down and bringing back with him all that he thought necessary for his studies" during the papacy of Sergius I (687–701). Bede's De temporum ratione is dedicated to Hwaetberht, so Bede appears to have regarded him highly. A letter from Saint Boniface to Hwaetberht dated to circa 747 has survived in the Boniface Correspondence, placing Hwætberht's death after that date. In the letter (Tangl 76), Boniface asks Hwaetberth to send him "the treatises of the monk Bede, that profound student of the Scriptures"; he also asks him to send him a cloak: "it would be of great comfort to me in my journeys". In return, he sent Hwaetberht a "coverlet" made of goat hair.

It was during Hwætberht's time that the remains of Abbots Sigfrith and Eosterwine were reburied alongside those of Benedict Biscop next to the main altar at Monkwearmouth.

== Works ==
In the preface to the fourth book of his commentary on I Samuel (In primam partem Samuhelis), Bede associates Hwætberht with the Latinate name Eusebius, which seems therefore to have been an alternative name taken by Hwætberht (citing Bede, De natura rerum, ed. D. Hurst, CCSL 119 (Turnhout 1962) 212.). For this reason, it has been inferred that Hwætberht was the author of a collection of sixty Latin riddles known as the Enigmata Eusebii. These were written as a supplement to forty riddles written earlier by Tatwine, Archbishop of Canterbury.

Preceded by Ceolfrid	Abbot of Jarrow; 716/7–740s	Succeeded by ?
