= Fulstow =

Marsh village and civil parish in the East Lindsey district of Lincolnshire, England

Coordinates: 53.4562°N 0.004°W

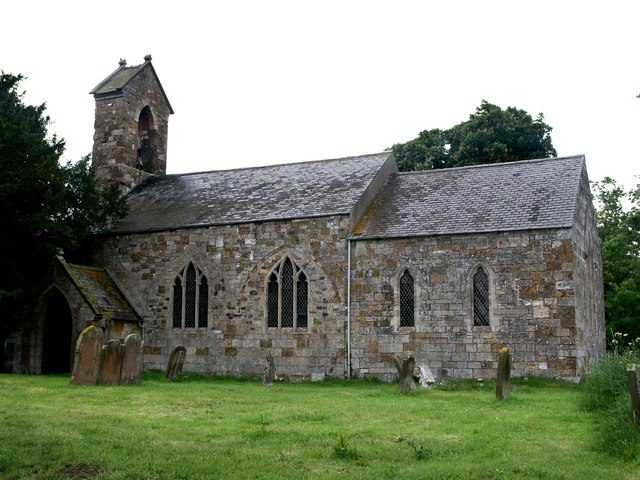
- Church of St Lawrence, Fulstow

- Location within Lincolnshire
- Population: 522 (2011)
- OS grid reference: TF 32614 97343
  - London: 135 mi (217 km) S
- District: East Lindsey
- Shire county: Lincolnshire
- Region: East Midlands
- Country: England
- Sovereign state: United Kingdom
- Post town: Louth
- Postcode district: LN11
- Police: Lincolnshire
- Fire: Lincolnshire
- Ambulance: East Midlands

Fulstow is a marsh village and civil parish in the East Lindsey district of Lincolnshire, England. It is situated 6 miles (10 km) north of Louth and 8 miles (13 km) south of Grimsby. Geographic Code E05009880 and Postal Code LN11 0X.

== Community ==
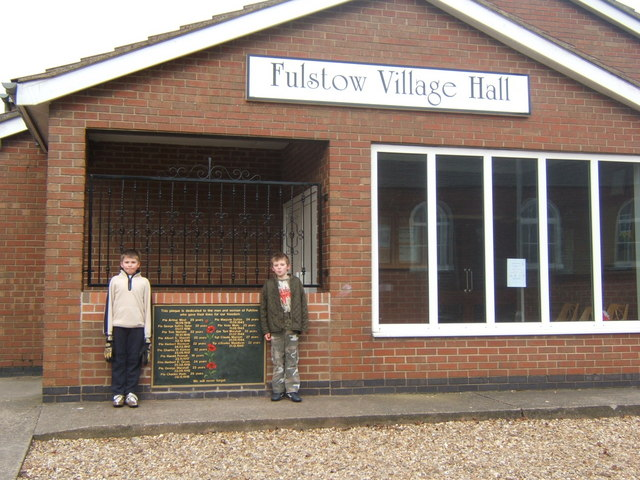
Village hall

The village is scattered around the "30 foot" contour road, which joins Fulstow to the neighbouring villages of Covenham and Alvingham to the south, Tetney to the north, and Ludborough to the west. Fulstow is on the Greenwich Meridian Line being the only village in England where this crosses the centre of the village.

Fulstow has fresh water springs, and a population of approximately 550. A majority of the population falls within the 50-80 age range. It has an approximate area of 0.3764 square kilometers.

Fulstow is listed in the 1086 Domesday survey as "Fuglestow" which translated literally as "Fowl [bird] Place".

Fulstow Grade II listed Anglican church is dedicated to St Lawrence. It originates from the early 13th century and is in Early English style. The belltower collapsed back in the 1720s and was rebuilt with a bellcote and single bell heard throughout the village. In 2009, a £5,000 grant went to repair efforts to maintain the limestone walls and interior.

In 1885 Kelly's Directory recorded the existence of three village chapels: Wesleyan, Primitive Methodist and Wesleyan Reformers. Agriculture centred on the growing of wheat, barley, oats and turnips. The civil parish, with the same boundaries, is represented by a parish council.

The Village hall was built in 1986 and is used for community functions. Unlike many other village halls this one is self funding and not Parish Council controlled.

There were once two public houses in the village, the Lord Nelson and The Cross Keys, but the Lord Nelson closed in 1969. The post office and general store was still operating until 2010, but was described in 2011 as "closed and derelict". It is now a private house.

The village primary school was opened by H Allenby of Kenwick Hall in 1863 It was built by with local subscription.

== Trivia ==
- Fulstow was once referred to as "Britain's most lawless village" in the Times newspaper in the 1901 due to its history of drunken violence and self-policing in its secluded geographical location.
- Due to its location in the marshes of Lincolnshire as well as the surrounding roads, there is no reason to pass through the village and Fulstow can be easily missed unless specifically intended.
- Since the early 2000s there has been a growing independence movement within the village (and surrounding areas). Primarily stemming from ideas surrounding the historical isle and Kingdom of Lindsey. Supported by a growing general disillusionment with the UK government at both a local and national level, and the idea that due to the land reclamation and drainage of the area beginning the Middle Ages onwards, the movement suggests that it is the land of the people and not that of a governmental state. The independent culture of the region's inhabitants has been around much longer however, and was even noted by E. H Rudkin, specifically in their book of Lincolnshire Folklore when commenting on the local belief in the bog spirits called Tiddy Mun.
- People "born" or have resided within the village for a significant amount of time refer to themselves as "Fulstownians" - in a similar vain of the medieval tribes that previously inhabited the area, such as the Corieltauvi and later, the Lindisfaras. There are various groups on social media dedicated, restricted and strictly monitored to include only those who can trace heritage back to the village.
