= Novem Codices =

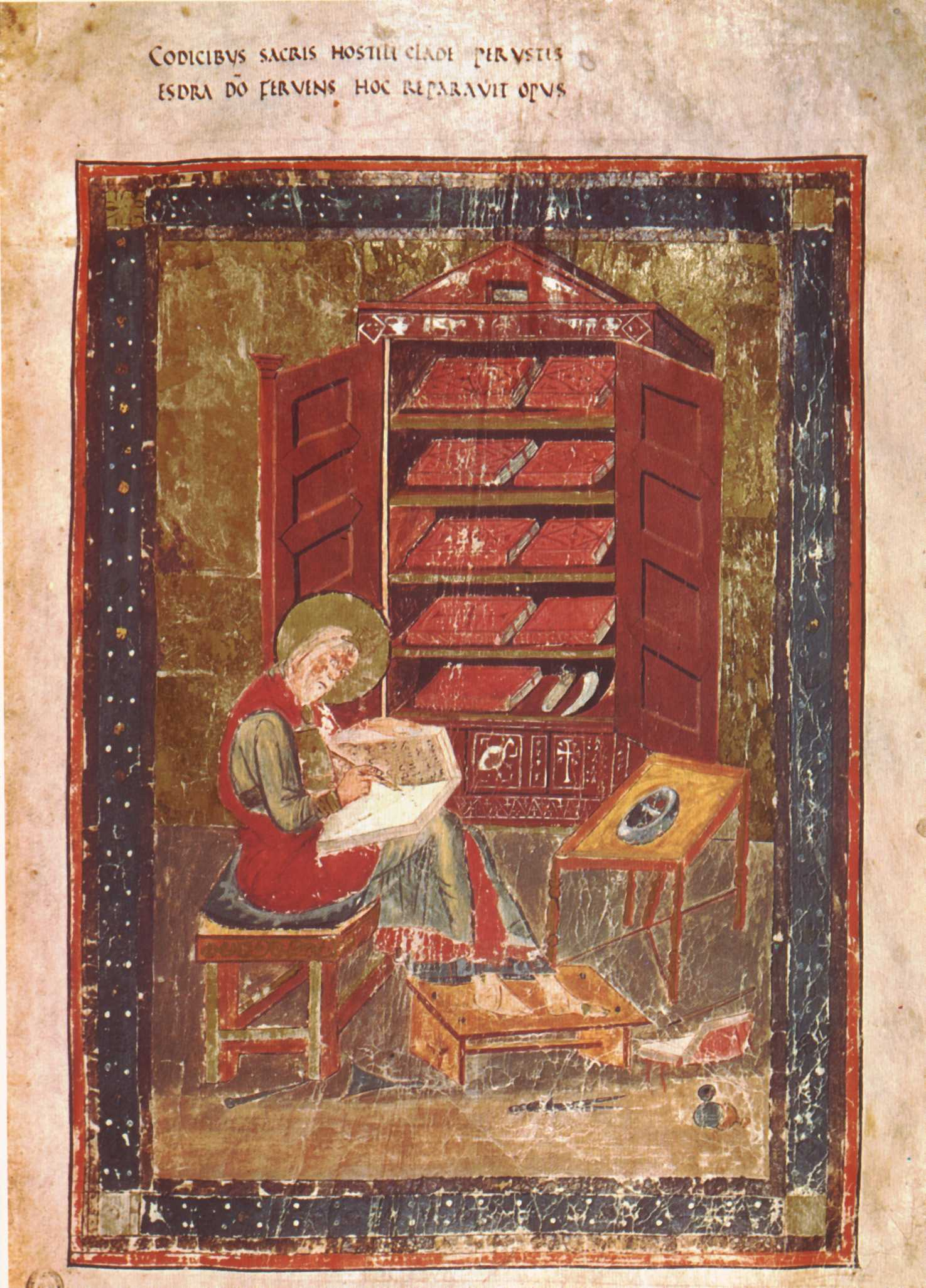
Folio 5r of the Codex Amiatinus, Ezra the Scribe. The nine volumes in the cupboard behind Ezra may be representation of the Novem Codices.

The Novem Codices were a copy of an Old Latin translation of the Bible in nine volumes which were created for or by Cassiodorus for his monastic foundation at Vivarium.

== Acquisition ==
Some or all of the Novem Codices were probably acquired by Benedict Biscop or Ceolfrid in Italy for the monastery at Monkwearmouth. The illumination of Ezra the Scribe in the Codex Amiatinus, which was created under the direction of Ceolfrid, has an open book cupboard containing a Bible in nine volumes which may be a representation of the Novem Codices.
