= Aldwin (prior) =

Aldwin was an Anglo-Saxon prior. Originally prior at Winchcombe, he wished to resurrect the monasteries of the Bedeian Northumbrian golden age, and refounded monasteries at Jarrow and Monkwearmouth in 1073 or 1074, becoming prior; his companion Elfwi took over the position while Aldwin was trying to resurrect a monastic community at Melrose. The monks of the revived Monkwearmouth-Jarrow Abbey were recalled to their mother house at Durham Cathedral Priory on 28 May 1083, and Aldwin was made Durham's first prior.

== Sources ==
- Knowles, Brooke & London, Heads of Religious Houses, i., p. 43 and 92
- Priors of Durham | Fasti Ecclesiae Anglicanae 1066-1300: volume 2 (pp. 32-36)
