= Alexander Boddy =

Vicar and Pioneer of Anglican Pentecostalism (1854–1930)

The Reverend Alexander Boddy
- Born: 15 November 1854
- Died: 10 September 1930 (aged 75)
- Spouse: Mary (m. 1891)
- Religion: Church of England
- Church: All Saints' Church, Monkwearmouth (1884–1922) St Laurence's Church, Pittington, Durham

Alexander Alfred Boddy (15 November 1854 – 10 September 1930) was an Anglican vicar and one of the founders of Pentecostalism in Britain.

== Early life ==
Boddy was born into an ecclesiastical family: his father was a vicar, and his mother was a descendant of Mary Vazeille, who had been married to John Wesley. Although he trained to be a solicitor, a religious experience at the Keswick Convention convinced him he should become ordained into the Church of England. Following several appointments, the Bishop of Durham, J. B. Lightfoot, placed him in All Saints Church in Monkwearmouth, Sunderland in 1884. In 1891 he married Mary Pollock.

Boddy was inspired by the Holiness Movement, and he had an intense religious experience in 1892. In 1899 his wife Mary experienced a healing from asthma and they both believed that she had a gift for healing through the laying-on of hands. In 1904 he visited Wales during the Welsh Revival and met Evan Roberts, and in 1907 he travelled to Oslo, where T. B. Barratt was leading a religious revival modelled on the events of the Azusa Street Revival in Los Angeles. Barratt was invited to Boddy's church, and subsequently Boddy and his wife began to experience speaking in tongues.

== Boddy in Pentecostal history ==
All Saints in Monkwearmouth became a centre for British Pentecostalism, and on Tuesday 28 October 1907, Mary Boddy laid hands on the evangelist Smith Wigglesworth. From 1908 to 1914 Boddy hosted a series of Sunderland Whitsuntide Conventions, which gained national press attention.

Boddy also helped to found the Pentecostal Missionary Union, with Cecil Polhill, and he was a member of the Pentecostal International Advisory Council (IAC). As a Church of England minister, he tried to discourage the creation of separate denominations.

== Teachings ==
Boddy taught that the purpose of the Holy Spirit was to emphasise Christ, and that divine love was more important than speaking in tongues. He continued to have a high view of the sacraments, and defended the practice of infant baptism. He warned against exaggeration as regards healing testimonies. He also believed that the Second Coming of Christ was imminent, and he suggested that certain events during World War I were portents of Biblical prophecy. After visiting the USA, he was disturbed by an emphasis among Pentecostal churches there on money. Unlike some other Pentecostals, he supported the British war effort.

== Publications ==
Prior to his Pentecostal experience Boddy composed a number of Roker Tracts on Holiness subjects. He also wrote several travel books on Russia, Canada, Palestine, and Egypt. From 1908–1926 he was the editor of and chief contributor to Confidence magazine.

== Sources ==
- Wakefield, Gavin, The First Pentecostal Anglican: The Life and Legacy of Alexander Boddy, Grove Books Limited: Cambridge, 2001.
- Wakefield, Gavin, Alexander Boddy Pentecostal Anglican Pioneer, Paternoster Press: ISBN 978-1-84227-346-3, 2007.

== Video ==
Outpouring of the Holy Spirit is a church history documentary about the 1907 Sunderland Revival and Alexander Boddy. (www.garywilkinson.eu)
