= Enigmata Eusebii =

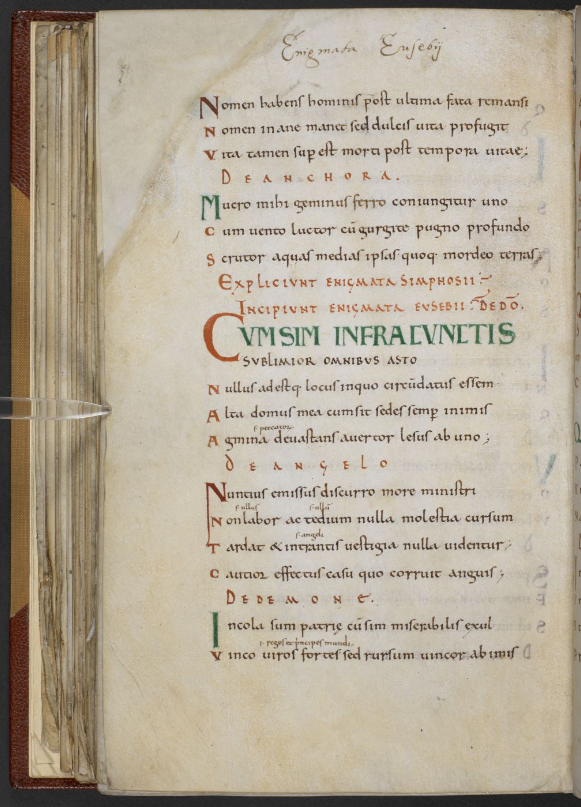
End of the riddles of Symphosius and beginning of the riddles of Eusebius in London, British Library, Royal MA 12 c xxiii folio 113v, showing Eusebius's riddles on an angel and a demon

The Enigmata Eusebii (riddles of Eusebius) are a collection of sixty Latin, hexametrical riddles composed in early medieval England, probably in the eighth century.

== Example ==
An example of Eusebius's work is enigma 42, on the dragon:

Latin original	English translation
Horridus horriferas speluncae cumbo latebras, Concitus aethereis uolitans miscebor et auris, Cristatusque uolans pulcher turbabitur aether. Corpore uipereas monstra uel cetera turmas Reptile sum superans gestantia pondus inorme. Inmanisque ferus preparuo pascitur ore, Atque per angustas assumunt uiscera uenas Aethereum flatum; nec dentibus austera uirtus Est mihi, sed mea uim uiolentem cauda tenebit.	A horrid beast, I lie in the ghastly gloom of a cavern, aroused, I fly fluttering into the lofty air and fly with my crest displayed, the fair air whirling. My crawling body is stronger than that of all snakes or any monsters dragging their excessive weights. Though uncouth and savage, I feed through a tiny mouth, my chest through narrow pipes is filled with breath, and not to my teeth do I owe my sinister power, nay, the seat of my impetuous strength is in my tail.

== Authorship ==
The manuscripts of the riddles name the author as Eusebius. This person has traditionally been identified as Hwætberht, the Abbot of Monkwearmouth-Jarrow Priory, based on Bede's identification of Hwætberht with the cognomen of 'Eusebius' in his Commentary on I Samuel. However, the identification with Hwætberht has been questioned by several scholars, including Emily V Thornbury, who has suggested that a Kentish author might be likely.

== Origins ==
The Enigmata Eusebii seem to have been composed to expand on the forty riddles of Tatwine, a collection composed by the eighth-century Mercian priest and archbishop Tatwine, perhaps specifically to bring their number up to one hundred: the riddles of Tatwine and Eusebius both survive in the same two manuscripts, and in both the riddles of Eusebius are alongside Tatwine's. These are the early 11th-century London, British Library, Royal 12.Cxxiii (fols. 121v-7r) and the mid-11th-century Cambridge, University Library, Gg.5.35 (fols. 374v-77v). Both of these collections were almost certainly inspired by the slightly earlier riddles of Aldhelm, another collection of one hundred Latin riddles. Many of Eusebius's riddles (and his predecessors') are based on the encyclopaedic writing of Isidore of Seville.

== Contents ==
Riddles 1-4 of Eusebius's riddles are on the chain of being, from God to Man, 5-11 mostly on cosmological phenomena, 12-29 a miscellaneous collection mostly of objects, 30-36 mostly on writing, and 37-60 on animals. The following is a complete list.

Number	Latin title	English translation
1	de Deo	God
2	de angelo	angel
3	de demone	fallen angel
4	de homine	man
5	de caelo	heaven
6	de terra	earth
7	de littera	letters
8	de uento et igne	wind and fire
9	de alpha	alpha
10	de sole	sun
11	de luna	moon
12	de boue	bullock
13	de uacca	cow
14	de x littera	the letter x
15	de igne et aqua	fire and water
16	de p<h>lasca	flask
17	de cruce	cross
18	de iniquitate et iustitia	iniquity and justice
19	de v littera	the letter u
20	de domo	house
21	de terra et mare	land and sea
22	de sermone	speech
23	de <a>equore	sea
24	de morte et uita	death and life
25	de animo	heart
26	de die bissextile	bissextile day
27	de humilitate et superbia	humility and pride
28	de candela	candle
29	de <a>etate et saltu	cycle and moon's leap
30	de atramentorio	ink-horn
31	de cera	wax
32	de membrano	parchment-sheets
33	de scetha	book-wallet
34	de flumine	river
35	de penna	quill
36	de gladio	sword
37	de uitulo	calf
38	de pullo	chicken
39	de i littera	the letter i
40	de pisce	fish
41	de chelidro serpente	water-serpent
42	de dracone	dragon
43	de tigri bestia	tiger
44	de pant[h]era	panther
45	de cameleone	camelopard (chameleon)
46	de leopardo	leopard
47	de scitali serpente	piebald serpent
48	de die et nocte	day and night
49	de anfibina serpente	two-headed serpent
50	de saura lacerto	lizard
51	de scorpione	scorpion
52	de cymera	chimera
53	de y<ppo>potamo pisce	hippopotamus
54	de oc<h>enao pisce	ship-retaining fish
55	de turpedo pisce	torpedo fish
56	de ciconia aui	stork
57	de strutione	ostrich
58	de noctua	owlet
59	de psi<t>taco	parrot
60	de bubone	horned owl.
