= All Saints' Church, Monkwearmouth =

All Saints' Church
- All Saints' Church shown within Tyne and Wear
- 54.915°N 1.380°W
- OS grid reference: NZ 398 580
- Location: City of Sunderland
- Country: England
- Denomination: Anglican
- Website: www.monkwearmouthcofe.com

History
- Status: Parish church
- Founded: 3 September 1844
- Consecrated: 23 October 1849

Architecture
- Functional status: Active
- Architect: J. Dobson Esq
- Architectural type: Early English Style
- Completed: 13 May 1849
- Construction cost: £2,200

Administration
- Province: York
- Diocese: Durham
- Parish: Monkwearmouth

Clergy
- Archbishop: Stephen Geoffrey Cotterell
- Bishop: vacant

All Saints' Church is a church in Monkwearmouth, Sunderland, England. A parish of All Saints was formed in 1844 when it became clear that there was no longer enough room in the only parish church for Monkwearmouth (St Peter's), and a church for the new parish was completed and consecrated in 1849. One of its vicars was Alexander Boddy, and so All Saints' became known as the birthplace of modern British Pentecostalism. All Saints' is now again part of the parish of Monkwearmouth.
