= Beda Bubbing =

Anglo-Saxon king

Beda Bubbing is a semi-Legendary King of Lindsey who appears in several Anglo-Saxon genealogies, most notably the Anglian Collection.

He is recorded as the son of Bubba and the father of Biscop, who is identified by Jacob Grimm as perhaps being Benedict Biscop, a 7th century Saint.
