= Parish of Monkwearmouth =

Parish in the Church of England

Coordinates: 54.915°N 1.383°W

The Parish of Monkwearmouth is a Church of England parish in Monkwearmouth, England, served by the churches of St Peter's, All Saints' and St Andrew's.

== History ==
The parish was originally only served by St Peter's, but new parishes of All Saints and St Andrew were split off from it in 1844 and 1906 respectively owing to urban expansion in the area. These parishes were later reunited to the parish of Monkwearmouth, which now includes all three churches. St Peter's was founded in AD 674–5 as one of the two churches of the Benedictine double monastery of Monkwearmouth–Jarrow Abbey.
