= Ceolfrith =

Anglo-Saxon abbot of 7th-8th centuries

Saint Ceolfrid
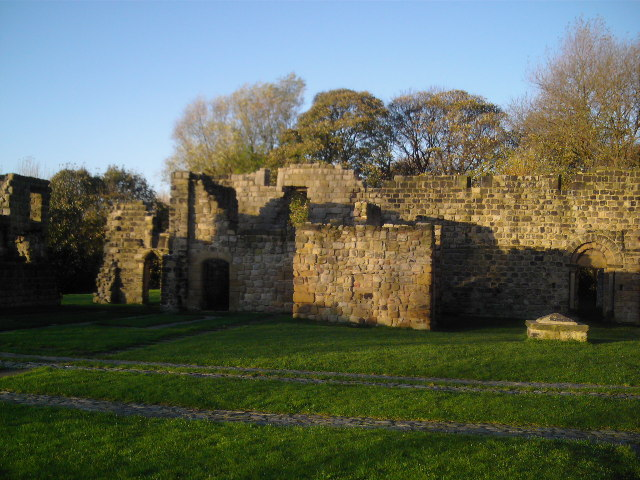
- Remains of St Paul's Monastery, Jarrow, where Ceolfrid was Abbot.
- Born: 642
- Died: 716 monastery of Langres in Burgundy
- Venerated in: Eastern Orthodox Church; Catholic Church
- Feast: 25 September

Saint Ceolfrid (or Ceolfrith, Old English: [ˈtʃeːolfriθ], also Geoffrey; c. 642 – 716) was an Anglo-Saxon Christian abbot and saint. He is best known as the warden of Bede from the age of seven until his death in 716. He was the Abbot of Monkwearmouth-Jarrow Abbey, and a major contributor to the project to produce the Codex Amiatinus Bible. He died in Burgundy while en route to deliver a copy of the codex to Pope Gregory II in Rome.

== Early life ==
Not much is known about the earlier period of Ceolfrid's life. His desire to join the monastic community was likely due to his own brother Cynefrid's devotion to the traditions of Christian monasticism. Historians date Ceolfrid's induction into monastic tradition around the date of Cynefrid's death in 660. Ceolfrid is known to have a strong family connection to monastic tradition. In addition to his brother, his cousin Tunbert was the first Abbot of the Monastery of Hexham. His first four years in cloister took place at Gilling Abbey in what is now North Yorkshire, which was also attended by Cynefrid, prior to his departure to Ireland. Ceolfrid is described as having "behaved of the greater devotion, giving his mind continually to reading, to labour, and monastic discipline". After these four years, Ceolfrid left Gilling as he "sought a monastery of a stricter character". He soon took in with a band of men, led by Wilfrid, later canonized as Saint Wilfrid. These monks are identified by Boutflower as being the Benedictines of Ripon at a monastery under the same name. During this time, he came to refine his own understanding of proper monastic principles. At the age of 27, Ceolfrid was ordained as a priest, and began to acquaint himself to the utmost with the practices of monastic life.

Very little is revealed about the period between the end of his days at Ripon, and his appointment under Benedict Biscop, except that he spent some time in the institutions of Abbot Botolph, whom he describes as being filled with "the grace of spirit". While having been revered as an inspiration for the way of divine living, Botolph also served to inspire a greater sense of humility within Ceolfrid.

== Relationship with Benedict Biscop ==
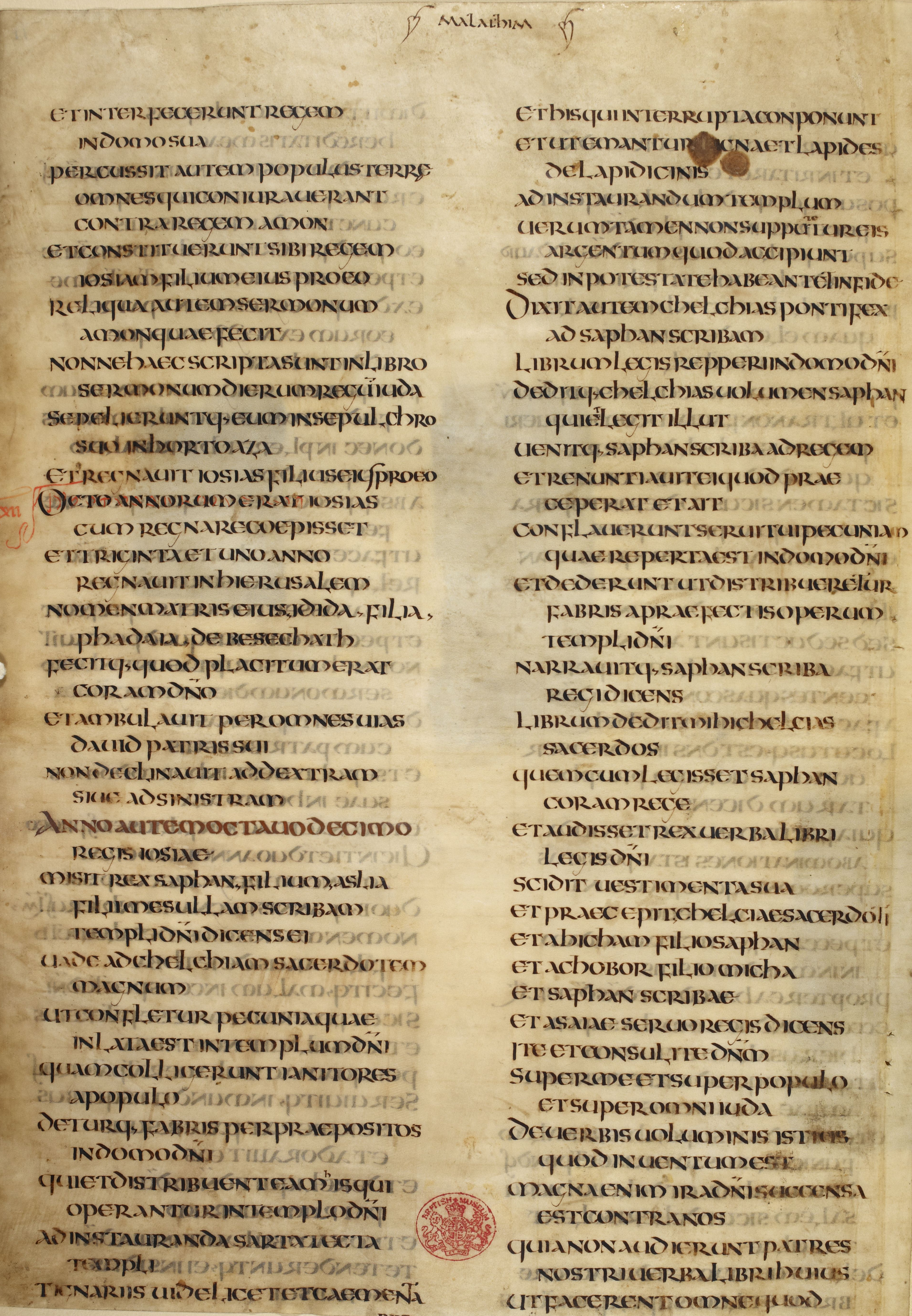
One of the few surviving pages from the Ceolfrid Bible, one of three versions of the Vulgate Bible created in Wearmouth and Jarrow under Ceolfrid at the turn of the eighth century. British Library, London.

In c.672/3, Benedict Biscop received a land grant from King Ecgfrith of Northumbria for the explicit purpose of erecting a monastery. During the construction of his first monastery at Wearmouth, Biscop appointed Abbot Eosterwini (anglicized as "Easterwine") as his primary Abbot and Coadjutor. The monastery took eight years to build. This institute had left Ecgfrith so enamoured that soon after the completion of the Wearmouth Monastery, he granted Biscop another segment of land for the construction of a second monastery, Jarrow, with the intention that the two should be administered as one.

It is during the construction of the Wearmouth Monastery that Benedict Biscop sought out Ceolfrid, who would become "his most zealous assistant from the first foundation of the former monastery", as well as a close friend. It appears that Biscop's invitation came at a most opportune time, for Ceolfrid had been contemplating the idea of leaving the post he held at the time. He had grown rather disenchanted with the power stratification within the institution (the name of which is unknown), had had enough of the "jealousies and very bitter persecutions of certain men of rank", and had been looking to return to his own monastery (assumed to be Ripon).

Upon the completion of the Jarrow Monastery, Ceolfrid became the Abbot of the St. Paul's Church on the monasterial grounds. Conflicting reports state that the presence of Ceolfrid during Jarrow's construction varied. Some papers state that Jarrow came into his hands after its completion, while another identified Ceolfrid as being paramount to the actual construction of the monastery; as the individual who directed the construction of the monastery itself.

The friendship between the two was fairly close. When Biscop sailed across the English channel to Rome for the last time, he chose only Ceolfrid to join him in his journey. Their travels would later be described in the works of Ceolfrid's ward, The Venerable Bede. Ceolfrid also used the trip to explore his role in Biscop's institution, feeling that Rome would be an opportune place to learn his position's responsibilities. Twelve years later, upon the death of Abbot Eosterwini, Ceolfrid was appointed as the first sole Abbot of both Monasteries of Wearmouth and Jarrow. In 690, Benedict Biscop died, after being bedridden for a lengthy period of time, and Ceolfrid became the leading head of both monasteries, "[whose] libraries of both monasteries, which Abbot Benedict had so actively begun, under his zealous care became doubled in extent".

== Relationship with Bede ==
Bede came into Ceolfrid's care at the young age of seven, and became the pupil of the Abbot as well as friend. In his early years at the twin Monasteries of Wearmouth – Jarrow (686), the Plague had struck Northumbria, and ravaged most of the countryside, including the twin Monasteries. Ceolfrid and Bede appeared to have remained untouched by the epidemic, and took the duties of caring for the infected and dying monks of the monasteries with unyielding fervour. They further worked together in maintaining the regular sermons when fear had gripped the population. When the Plague finally passed over, master and pupil began to rebuild the monastic foundations and succeeded effectively. Bede remained in Jarrow for the majority of his life, never straying more than 70 miles from the monastery at any time. He was a loyal pupil until Ceolfrid's death, and he died in Jarrow in 735.

== The Codex Amiatinus ==
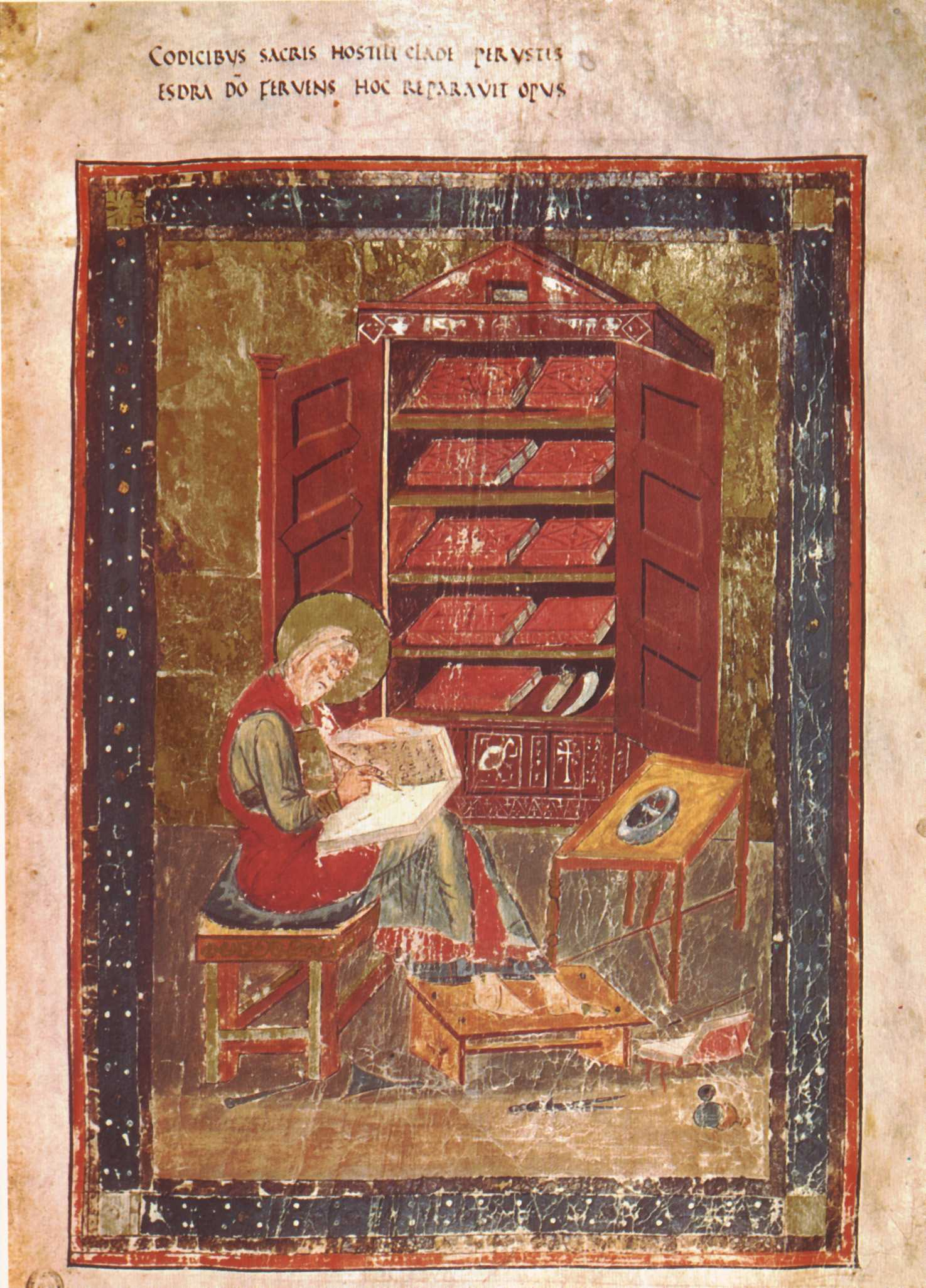
Portrait of Ezra from the Codex Amiatinus in the Laurentian Library, Florence.

The Codex Amiatinus is the oldest manuscript with a complete text of the Vulgate. The Codex Amiatinus is described as a brilliant display of the beauty that is Early British, Pre-Carolingian calligraphy. It used as a model the (Vetus Latina) Codex Grandior of Cassiodorus, which Coelfrith had obtained in Rome.

The composition of the Vulgate was part of the project to expand Wearmouth and Jarrow's extensive library, and Ceolfrid ordered three copies of this Bible manuscript to be composed; one of which would be dedicated to the Pope Gregory II, while the other two copies were meant to stay in the respective churches of Wearmouth and Jarrow. There are no official records that state that the text made it to Rome. It is said that instead, it made its way into Florence, where it was presented by the Lombard Abbot Peter to the Abbazia di San Salvatore at Mount Amiata in Tuscany. It is believed that he changed the dedicatory note inscribed within the leaves as donated to the monastery. This occurred in the 9th century. The document remained at Mount Amiata until 1786, when it was relocated to the Laurentian Library in Florence. There is some dispute over what consisted of this Vulgate Codex. Over the past few hundred years, additional leaves that appear to be related to this text have been located in Britain, some having been used as book wrappings. These new discoveries have led scholars to question the total length of the codex, as there are still fragments missing from it today.

== Ceolfrid and the Picts ==
Sometime after 711, Nechtan mac Der-Ilei, King of the Picts, sought authoritative advice from Abbot Ceolfrid on the reform of paschal cycles with a view to harmonising the celebration of Easter within his kingdom. By 716 both the Picts and the Columban clergy of Iona had adopted the pascha catholica.

== Final days ==
Ceolfrid apparently knew that he was coming to the end of his life, and so he resigned his post and was succeeded by Hwaetberht. He then set sail for Rome with the intent of delivering the Codex Amiatinus Bible to Pope Gregory II. He made it as far as Langres in Burgundy, where he died on 29 September 716 and was buried.

Preceded by –	Abbot of Jarrow; 682–716/7	Succeeded by Hwaetberht
Preceded by Sigfrith	Abbot of Monkwearmouth; 690–716/717	Succeeded by ?
