= St Andrew's Church, Roker =

Church in Sunderland, England

St Andrew's, Roker
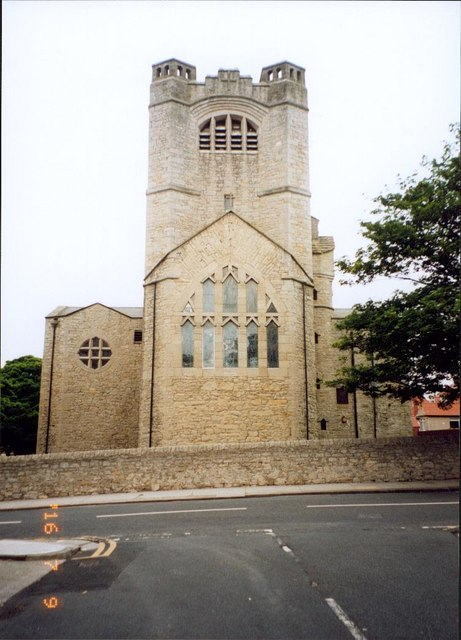
- St Andrew's, Roker
- 54.923°N 1.367°W
- OS grid reference: NZ 40407 59380
- Location: Roker, Sunderland, Tyne and Wear
- Country: England
- Denomination: Church of England

History
- Status: Parish church
- Dedication: Saint Andrew

Architecture
- Heritage designation: Grade I listed building
- Designated: 1950
- Architect: Edward Schroeder Prior
- Years built: 1907

Administration
- Diocese: Durham
- Parish: Monkwearmouth

Clergy
- Priest: The Revd Richard Bradshaw

St Andrew's, Roker (1905–7), is a Church of England parish church in Sunderland, England. It is recognised as one of the finest churches of the first half of the twentieth century and the masterpiece of Edward Schroeder Prior. The design of St Andrew's drew together many of the strings of Prior's philosophy and approach to design and building. Three years before commencing St Andrew's, Prior had written that the architect's first purpose was to provide;

"a dignified distinct building dedicated to the service of the Church. Church architecture, least of all, has been able to go beyond the trivial efforts of traditional picturesqueness; least of all our building it has been monumental".

At St Andrew's, Prior achieved a monumental church free from style. His experiments in structure, concern for materials and means of building reached their apogee at St Andrew's. The church was listed Grade I in 1950.

== Origins ==
Throughout the 19th century Sunderland's population had been rapidly expanding. By the end of the century only the area around Roker Park remained undeveloped. The development of the area prompted the need for a new church. The Roker and Fulwell New Church Committee was set up in 1903 to raise funds for the church. A local shipbuilder John Priestman offered £6000 towards the construction in memorial to his mother. As conditions of the offer Priestman required the church to be completed by 31 December 1905, to retain the right to approve the arrangements of the new church and to provide the living for a vicar of his own choice.

Prior seemed fated to win the commission. B. F. Wescott, Prior's tutor at Cambridge, had been Bishop of Durham until his death in 1901. His successor, the Reverend Handley Moule, was an original trustee of Prior's Henry Martyn Hall, Cambridge. The vicar of the adjacent Monkwearmouth church the Revd. D. S. Boutflower was a close friend of Prior's brother Charles.

Priestman appears to have been a religious radical, heavily influenced by the late 19th century liturgical movement that sought a return to the importance of the word and communion, rather than placing an emphasis on the mysteries of the church and sacraments. These views were reflected in his design requirements for the church. He wished the church to seat 700, and most importantly for the entire congregation to have an uninterrupted view of the altar and pulpit, with no chancel screen and good acoustics. These requirements had a major influence on Prior's design.

== The design ==
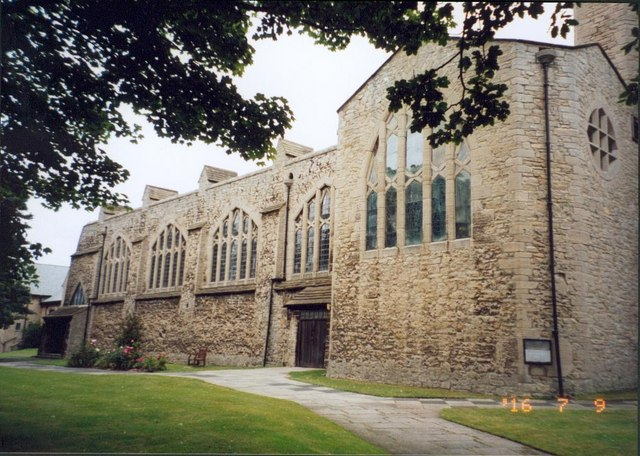
The church from the south east

The first plan of January 1905 envisaged a nave, side aisles to the north and south, a choir, a square-ended chancel, short transepts and porches to the north, south and east sides. The design provided for a capacity of 590. Priestman wanted 700. Prior re-worked the design adding a morning chapel and moving the south porch to the west. This arrangement provided for 688.

The hilltop exposed site by the sea and availability of stone suggested a similar structure and approach to that taken at Holy Trinity Church, Bothenhampton in Dorset. However dressed stone was too expensive and St Andrew's was designed as a reinforced concrete building. The use of the material has a significant influence on the design, for example the nave arches are shaped to ease the pouring of concrete.

The church has a five-bayed nave 52' wide with an extraordinary single span roof with thick, deep arches that spring low from massive walls. The chancel is narrow, shallow and tapered towards the east end. The nave walls are 3'6" thick at floor level, which reduce to 2'6" at window sill height.

The transverse nave arches basically follow the design at Holy Trinity but the span of the roof is 42' instead of 29'. They are brought down into the church as internal buttresses. The buttresses are pierced to make side passages, the weight being transferred to paired columns of a pattern of Saxon origin, with simple cushion capitals similar to those depicted in William Lethaby's The Church of Sancta Sophia, Constantinople.

The stone masonry is of local Marsden limestone from a quarry three miles north of the site. Fulwell Quarry was nearer but this was highly mechanised. Prior initiated a rediscovery of masonry skills in conjunction with the quarry company. Prior, Randall Wells and the masons explored the limits of the stone through the construction and adapted the design accordingly. The roof is covered in Yorkshire slate.

The interior and exterior finish is of unplastered uncoursed random-rubble with only the quoins and voussoirs dressed to a flat surface. In early plans it appeared to be the intention to leave the walls as exposed concrete. The chancel was originally left with its shutter marks displayed until MacDonald Gill implemented Prior's suggested decorative scheme.

== Exterior ==
A prominent square tower was located over the chancel aligned with the road leading to the sea. Prior regarded "a square-topped spireless tower was an expression of "democratic growth". The positioning of the tower over the chancel blurred the distinction between nave and chancel, clergy and parishioners. The tower has with angle turrets that rise to pinnacles above the castellated parapet. There are pairs of round headed openings on each face that open to ventilation shafts leading to either side of the altar. The bell openings have corbelled lintels. To the north east corner of the tower there is a round tower staircase that acts as a buttress. The tower forms a memorial to Priestman's mother.

The windows and their openings make a major contribution to the character of the church. Those of the nave have stone block mullions with simple feathering. They are crossed braced with transoms with triangles above formed by simple canted stone. The small windows of the tower show a distinct Saxon influence, directly quoting St Peter's Church, Barton-upon-Humber. The openings are spanned by two stones meeting at the apex. They project forward to form a rain hood. In the chancel the tracery is more complex with stepped 'capitals' formed by three blocks in the lower tracery each faintly suggesting the Crucifixion. The windows are glazed in Prior's Early English Glass, except for the chancel east window and the Lady Chapel. The iron glazing bars were made by Priestman's yard.

Externally the church appears simple and massive. The nave wall is set back from window sill level upwards allowing light further into the interior but creating a visual impression that the building is rooted in the ground and that the walls are much thicker than they are. Buttresses are continued up between the windows to near apex height. Roofed pinnacles at parapet level imply their structural continuation. The parapet itself is high and continuous around the nave and transepts suppressing the verticality of the building.

The tower, unusually located over the chancel, has four hexagonal corner towers with two small openings in each face. They were originally capped with pyramid roofs, but these have been removed due to wind damage. Each face of the tower has a broad shallow bell chamber window. The nave roof appears to be carried through the tower to a vestigial nave roof projecting from its east end.

The porches are simple lean-to structures to form entrances.

== Services ==
Ventilation, heating and lighting were integrated into the structure. In addition to the ventilation shafts in the tower that worked on a stack effect, heating shafts were provided within the mass concrete walls connecting to a plenum system running below the floor to a chamber below the chancel where high indirect radiators were located. A Blackman fan was capable of producing 700,000 cubic feet (20,000 m^{3}) of air per hour into the church.

== Furnishings ==
Prior called on a range of associates from the Movement creating a range of very fine fittings. The reredos is a tapestry made to a design of Edward Burne-Jones, The Adoration of the Magi, and was made by Morris & Co, as is the chancel carpet. Ernest Gimson provided the altar rails, Bishop's chair, altar and processional crosses, candlesticks, pulpit, choir seats and lectern. The foundation stone was carved by Eric Gill. After Prior's death MacDonald Gill painted the dome over the chancel to Prior's sketch scheme, depicting the days of the Creation.

The baptistry contains a stone bowl font by Wells with carved hexagonal piers and a wood cover by Robert (Mouseman) Thompson of Kilburn.

The walls of the nave are panelled in oak to 7' 8" high with boards of uneven width, fixed with hand made nails.

Henry Payne designed the glass in the two main windows in the church: the east window which depicts the Ascension and the south transept window depicting the biblical text “Come unto me all ye that are heavy laden”. In the lower lights of the south transept window, Payne drew his figures in contemporary dress and in the upper lights a group of angels are shown carrying Christ's cross.

A fine peal of 10 bells was installed in 1948 as a War Memorial. These bells were cast in Croydon by Gillett & Johnston. The largest, or tenor, bell weighs 22cwt 2qtrs 26 lbs, or 2550 lbs, or 1150 kg.

== Construction ==
As at Home Place, Kelling in Norfolk, Prior disposed of the normal method of procurement, there was no overall contract. Contracts and estimates were issued and received as the works proceeded and as was necessary. Priestman & Co, the shipbuilding concern of the church's main benefactor, were responsible for various works including all the iron work and the main doors.

Prior and Randall Wells acted in partnership. Wells acted as resident architect sending drawings of details to Prior at regular intervals. Prior approved or altered the details as he desired. Prior was careful to give full credit to Wells.

== Organ ==
Priestman was an accomplished organist with an organ in his private residence and seems to have ensured that the church's organ was well placed in the north transept. Ostensibly it is a fine Norman & Beard organ but it has been discovered to be the Forster and Andrews organ from St Wulfram's Church, Grantham.

== Completion ==
The church was finished on 17 July 1907.

== Priestman Hall ==
To the west, the church has a very robust parish hall in the same style as the main building (though it doesn't have the upturned boat shape), called The Priestman Hall and constructed in 1928. It is separately listed as Grade II.

== Lych gate ==
A lych gate was added to the south-east corner of the site as a War Memorial in 1920. With the churchyard walls, it was listed as Grade II (but the listing text states "probably 1908").

== Sources ==
- Garnham, Trevor; St Andrew's Church, Roker: Edward Prior, Architecture in detail, Phaidon, 1996
