= Smith Wigglesworth =

British evangelist (1859–1947)

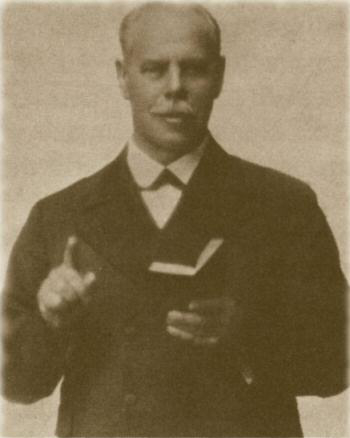
- Born: 10 June 1859; Menston, Yorkshire, England
- Died: 12 March 1947 (aged 87); Glad Tidings Hall, Wakefield, Yorkshire, England
- Occupations: Plumber (initially); Evangelist
- Spouse: Mary Jane Featherstone (m. 1882-1913; her death)
- Children: Alice, Seth, Harold, Ernest & George

Smith Wigglesworth (10 June 1859 – 12 March 1947) was a British evangelist who was influential in the early history of Pentecostalism.

== Early life ==
Smith Wigglesworth was born on 10 June 1859 in Menston, Yorkshire, England, to an impoverished family. As a small child, he worked in the fields pulling turnips alongside his mother; he also worked in factories to help provide for his family. He was illiterate as a child, being unschooled because of his labours.

Nominally a Methodist, he became a born again Christian at the age of eight. His grandmother was a devout Methodist; his parents, John and Martha, took young Smith to Methodist and Anglican churches on regular occasions. He was confirmed by a Bishop in the Church of England, baptized by immersion in a Baptist church and had grounding in Bible teaching in the Plymouth Brethren while learning the plumbing trade as an apprentice from a man in the Brethren movement.

Wigglesworth married Mary Jane "Polly" Featherstone on 4 December 1882 at St Peter's church, Bradford. At the time of their marriage, she was a preacher with the Salvation Army and had come to the attention of General William Booth. They had one daughter, Alice, and four sons, Seth, Harold, Ernest and George. Polly died in 1913. Their grandson, Leslie Wigglesworth, after more than 20 years as a missionary in the Congo, served as the president of the Elim Pentecostal Church.

Wigglesworth learned to read after he married Polly; she taught him to read the Bible. He often stated that it was the only book he ever read, and did not permit newspapers in his home, preferring the Bible to be their only reading material.

Wigglesworth worked as a plumber, but he abandoned this trade because he was too busy for it after he started preaching. In 1907, Wigglesworth visited Alexander Boddy during the Sunderland Revival, and following a laying-on of hands from Alexander's wife, Mary Boddy, he experienced Baptism with the Holy Spirit and spoke in tongues. He spoke at some of the Assemblies of God events in Great Britain. He also received ministerial credentials with the Assemblies of God in the United States, where he evangelized from 1924 to 1929.

== Ministry ==
Wigglesworth believed that healing came through faith, and he was flexible in his approach. When he was forbidden to lay hands on audience members by the authorities in Sweden, he preached for a "corporate healing", by which people laid hands on themselves. He also practiced anointing with oil, and the distribution of "prayer handkerchiefs" (one of which was sent to King George V). Wigglesworth sometimes attributed ill-health to demons.

Wigglesworth largely believed his ministerial success was due to his Baptism with the Holy Spirit. He said:

I want you to see that he that speaketh in an unknown tongue edifieth himself or builds himself up. We must be edified before we can edify the church. I cannot estimate what I, personally, owe to the Holy Ghost method of spiritual edification. I am here before you as one of the biggest conundrums in the world. There never was a weaker man on the platform. Language? None. Inability–full of it. All natural things in my life point exactly opposite to my being able to stand on the platform and preach the gospel. The secret is that the Holy Ghost came and brought this wonderful edification of the Spirit. I had been reading this Word continually as well as I could, but the Holy Ghost came and took hold of it, for the Holy Ghost is the breath of it, and He illuminated it to me.

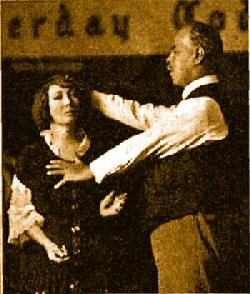
Smith Wigglesworth praying for a sick woman

Ministering at many churches throughout Yorkshire, often at Bethesda Church at Swallownest (on the outskirts of Sheffield), Wigglesworth claimed to have made many prophecies. He also had an international ministry. He ministered in the U.S., Australia, New Zealand, South Africa, Sweden, the Pacific Islands, India, Ceylon, and several countries in Europe. Some of his sermons were transcribed for Pentecostal magazines, and these were collected into two books: Ever Increasing Faith and Faith that Prevails.

He continued to minister until the time of his death on 12 March 1947.

== Healing ==
There were numerous claims of divine healing during Wigglesworth's ministry. These include a woman healed of a tumor, a woman healed of tuberculosis, a wheelchair-confined woman walking, and many more. There were reports that people were raised from the dead (enumerated 3 to 137 by different sources), including (briefly) his wife Polly.

Many people said they were cured of cancer by Jesus Christ through him. Wigglesworth described cancer as "a living evil spirit", and insisted that many diseases were "Satanic in origin".

His methods often involved hitting, slapping, or punching the afflicted part of the body. On a number of occasions his approach to persons suffering from stomach complaints was to punch them in the stomach, sometimes with such force that it propelled them across the room. When challenged on this, his response was "I don't hit them, I hit the devil".

Responding to criticism over his method of praying for the sick, Wigglesworth stated: "You might think by the way I went about praying for the sick that I was sometimes unloving and rough, but oh, friends, you have no idea what I see behind the sickness and the one who is afflicted. I am not dealing with the person; I am dealing with the satanic forces that are binding the afflicted".

On one occasion Wigglesworth declared to the sick "I'll only pray for you once, to pray twice is unbelief". The second night, a man approached the altar to receive prayer again and Wigglesworth, recognizing him, said "Didn't I pray for you last night? You are full of unbelief, get off this platform!"

He died at the funeral of his close friend, Wilf Richardson, on 12 March 1947, at the age of 87.
