= Tatwine =

Archbishop of Canterbury from 731 to 734, Christian saint

Saint Tatwine
- Archbishop of Canterbury
- Appointed: 731
- Term ended: 30 July 734
- Predecessor: Berhtwald
- Successor: Nothhelm
- Other post: Abbot of Breedon-on-the-Hill

Orders
- Consecration: 10 June 731

Personal details
- Born: c. 670
- Died: 30 July 734

Sainthood
- Feast day: 30 July
- Venerated in: Catholic Church; Eastern Orthodox Church
- Canonized: Pre-Congregation

Tatwine (Note: Sometimes Tatwin, Tatuini, or Tadwinus) (c. 670 – 30 July 734) was the tenth Archbishop of Canterbury from 731 to 734. Prior to becoming archbishop, he was a monk and abbot of a Benedictine monastery. Besides his ecclesiastical career, Tatwine was a writer, and riddles he composed survive. Another work he composed was on the grammar of the Latin language, which was aimed at advanced students of that language. He was subsequently considered a saint.

== Biography ==
Tatwine was a Mercian by birth. His epigraph at Canterbury stated that when he died he was in old age, so perhaps he was born around 670. He became a monk at the monastery at Breedon-on-the-Hill in the present-day County of Leicestershire, and then abbot of that house. Through the influence of King Æthelbald he was appointed as Archbishop of Canterbury in 731 and was consecrated on 10 June 731. He was one of a number of Mercians who were appointed to Canterbury during the 730s and 740s. Apart from his consecration of the Bishops of Lindsey and Selsey in 733, Tatwine's period as archbishop appears to have been uneventful. He died in office on 30 July 734. Later considered a saint, his feast day is 30 July.

== Writings ==
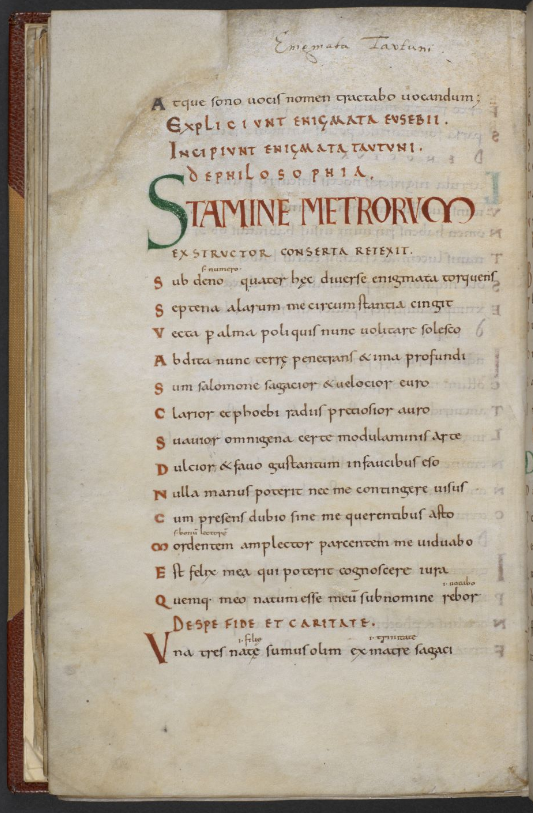
Riddles of Tatwine, London, British Library, Royal MA 12 c xxiii folio 121v, showing Tatwine's riddles on philosophy and on faith, hope, and charity following on from the riddles of Eusebius

Bede's commentary on Tatwine calls him a "vir religione et Prudentia insignis, sacris quoque literis nobiliter instructus" (a man notable for his prudence, devotion and learning). These qualities were displayed in the two surviving manuscripts of his riddles and four of his Ars Gramattica Tatuini.

=== Ars Gramattica Tatuini ===
The Ars is one of only two surviving eighth-century Latin grammars from England. The grammar is a reworking of Donatus's Ars Minor with the addition of information drawn from other grammarians, such as Priscian and Consentius. It was not designed for a newcomer to the Latin language, but rather for more advanced students. It covers the eight parts of speech through illustrations drawn from classical scholars, although not directly but through other grammatical works. There are also some examples drawn from the Psalms. The work was completed before Tatwine became archbishop, and was used not only in England but also on the Continent.

=== Riddles ===
It is almost certain that Tatwine was inspired to develop the culture of riddle-writing in early medieval England because he had read the Epistola ad Acircium by the West-Saxon scholar Aldhelm (d. 709), which combined studies of Latin grammar and metre with the presentation of one hundred hexametrical riddles. Frederick Tupper believed that Aldhelm's influence was minimal, but subsequent scholars have argued that Tatwine's riddles owed a substantial debt to those of Aldhelm.

Tatwine's riddles deal with such diverse topics as philosophy and charity, the five senses and the alphabet, and a book, and a pen, yet, according to Mercedes Salvador-Bello, these riddles are placed in a carefully structured sequence: 1–3 and 21–26 on theology (e.g. 2, faith, hope, and charity), 4–14 on objects associated with ecclesiastical life (e.g. 7, a bell), 15–20 on wonders and monsters (e.g. 16, prepositions with two cases), 27–39 on tools and related natural phenomena (e.g. 28, an anvil, and 33, fire), with a final piece on the sun's rays.

Tatwine's riddles survive in two manuscripts: the early 11th-century London, British Library, Royal 12.Cxxiii (fols. 121v–7r) and the mid-11th-century Cambridge, University Library, Gg.5.35 (fols. 374v–77v). In both manuscripts, they are written alongside the riddles of Eusebius: it seems clear that Eusebius (whose identity is uncertain) added sixty riddles to Tatwine's forty to take the collection up to one hundred.

Tatwine gives a sign in one of the riddles of the growing acceptance among scholars in the Christian west of the legitimacy of philosophy: "De philosophia: est felix mea qui poterit cognoscere iura" (Of Philosophy: happy is he who can know my laws). The riddles are formed in acrostics.

==== Example ====
An example of Tatwine's work is enigma 11, on the needle:

Enigma 11
Latin original

Torrens me genuit fornax de uiscere flammae,
Condi<t>or inualido et finxit me corpore luscam;
Sed constat nullum iam sine me uiuere posse.
Est mirum dictu, cludam ni lumina uultus,
Condere non artis penitus molimina possum.

English translation

Brought forth in the fiery womb of a blazing furnace,
my maker formed me one-eyed and frail;
yet surely none could ever live without me.
Strange to say, unless my eye is blinded,
my skill produces not the smallest piece of work.

==== List ====
Tatwine's riddles are on the following topics.

Numbered list of Tatwine's riddles
Number	Latin title	English translation
1	de philosophia	philosophy
2	de spe, fide (et) caritate	hope, faith (and) charity
3	de historia et sensu et morali et allegoria	historical, spiritual, moral, and allegorical sense
4	de litteris	letters
5	de membrano	parchment
6	de penna	pen
7	de tinti(n)no	bell
8	de ara	altar
9	de cruce Xristi	Christ's cross
10	de recitabulo	lectern
11	de acu	needle
12	de patena	paten
13	de acu pictili	embroidery needle
14	de caritate	love
15	de niue, grandine et glacie	snow, hail and ice
16	de pr(a)epositione utriusque casus	prepositions with two cases
17	de sciuro	squirrel
18	de oculis	eyes
19	de strabis oculis	squinting eyes
20	de lusco	the one-eyed
21	de malo	evil
22	de Adam	Adam
23	de trina morte	threefold death
24	de humilitate	humility
25	de superbia	pride
26	de quinque sensibus	the five senses
27	de forcipe	a pair of tongs
28	de incude	anvil
29	de mensa	table
30	de ense et uagina	sword and sheath
31	de scintilla	spark
32	de sagitta	arrow
33	de igne	fire
34	de faretra	quiver
35	de pru(i)na	ember
36	de uentilabro	winnowing fork
37	de seminante	sower
38	de carbone	charcoal
39	de coticulo	whetstone
40	de radiis solis	rays of the sun

== Editions and translations ==
- 'Aenigmata Tatvini', ed. by Fr. Glorie, trans. by Erika von Erhardt-Seebold, in Tatuini omnia opera, Variae collectiones aenigmatum merovingicae aetatis, Anonymus de dubiis nominibus, Corpus christianorum: series latina, 133–133a, 2 vols (Turnholt: Brepols, 1968).

== Citations ==
Christian titles
Preceded by Berhtwald	Archbishop of Canterbury; 731–734	Succeeded by Nothhelm
