= Sigfrith =

Seventh century Anglo-Saxon Abbot

Sigfrith (also Sigfrid) (died 689) was abbot of Monkwearmouth Priory in Sunderland north-east England.

Sigfrith was a deacon at the time he was chosen "by Ceolfrid [abbot of the twin abbey at Jarrow] and the monks" (Bede, Lives of the abbots, 10 - 13). Bede states:

He was a man well skilled in the knowledge of Holy Scripture of most excellent manners, of wonderful continence, and one in whom the virtues of the mind were in no small degree depressed by bodily infirmity, and the innocency of whose heart was tempered with a baneful and incurable affection of the lungs.

Soon afterwards, both he and the abbey's founder Benedict Biscop both fell fatally ill:

Now both the abbots saw that they were near death, and unfit longer to rule the monastery, from increasing weakness which, though tending no doubt to the perfection of Christian purity, was so great, that, when they expressed a desire to see one another before they died, and Sigfrid was brought in a litter into the room where Benedict was lying on his bed, though they were placed by the attendants with their heads on the same pillow, they had not the power of their own strength to kiss one another, but were assisted even in this act of fraternal love. After taking counsel with Sigfrid and the other brethren, Benedict sent for Ceolfrid, abbot of St. Paul's, dear to him not by relationship of the flesh, but by the ties of Christian virtue, and with the consent and approbation of all, made him abbot of both monasteries. (Bede)

Two months later Sigfrid died, only four months before Benedict's own death.

== Notes ==
Preceded by Eosterwine	Abbot of Monkwearmouth; 686–690	Succeeded by Ceolfrid
