= Lindisfaras =

Anglian tribe

Map of Lindsey

The Lindisfaras or Lindesfaras (Old English: Lindisfaran) were an Anglian tribe who, in the 6th century, established the kingdom of Lindsey between the valleys of the rivers Humber and Witham, in the north of what is now Lincolnshire. They retained their administrative independence throughout the 7th century but, following the Battle of the Trent between the kingdoms of Mercia and Northumbria, remained under Mercian control until the Viking invasion of the ninth century. According to D. P. Kirby, the Heathfeld Land of Yorkshire mentioned as part of the Lindisfaras' 7000 hides listed in the Tribal Hidage, was Hatfield Chase.

Lindisfarne in Northumbria derived its name, according to one place-name authority, from the Lindisfaras, so having the meaning "island [of the] travellers from Lindsey", indicating that the island was settled from Lindsey, or possibly that its inhabitants travelled there.

== See also ==
- Diocese of Lindsey
