= Kingdom of Lindsey =

Minor Anglo-Saxon kingdom in eastern England

Kingdom of Lindsey Lindesege (Old English)
- 6th-7th centuries
- Capital: Lincoln
- Religion: Anglo-Saxon paganism, Anglo-Saxon Christianity
- Historical era: Anglo-Saxon
Preceded by	Succeeded by
Sub-Roman Britain	Mercia
- Today part of: United Kingdom

The Lindsey (Old English: Lindesege) was a lesser Anglo-Saxon kingdom in what is now north Lincolnshire in the sixth and seventh centuries, possibly extending into the early eighth century. The name Lindsey derives from the Old English toponym Lindesege, meaning "Isle of Lind". Lindum Colonia was the Roman name of the settlement which is now the City of Lincoln in Lincolnshire. (Lindum Colonia was shortened in Old English to Lindocolina and then Lincylene.) Lindum was a Latinised form of a native Brittonic name which has been reconstructed as *Lindon (lit. 'pool' or 'lake'; cf. modern Welsh llyn).

== Geography ==
Lindsey lay between the Humber estuary and the Wash, forming its inland boundaries from the courses of the Witham and Trent rivers, and the Foss Dyke between them. A marshy region south of the Humber known as the Isle of Axholme was also included. It is believed that Roman Lindum (Lincoln) was the capital of Lindsey: the continuity of the place name suggests continuity of settlement traditions: in 625, Bede recounts, the missionary Paulinus of York was received by the praefectus of Lindum. Place-name evidence is suggestive that the Anglian settlement known as Lindisfaras spread from the Humber coast.

Lindsey means the 'island of Lincoln': it was surrounded by water and very wet land. Lincoln was in the south-west part of the kingdom. During the Anglo-Saxon settlement of Britain, from about 450, Lindsey was one of the lesser kingdoms. Although it has its own list of kings, at an early date it came under external influence. It was from time to time effectively part of Deira, of the Northumbrian kingdom and, particularly later, of Mercia. Lindsey lost its independence long before the arrival of the Danish settlers.

Southern and eastern Britain in the early 7th century

== History ==
Toby Martin and Catherine Hills identify Lindsey as an area in which large-scale settlement by the Angles occurred. However, a continuing British presence in the region is indicated by the fact that major settlements such as Lincoln, and Lindsey itself, have partially Celtic names. Caitlin Green suggests that some communities may have continued to speak Brittonic until the eighth century.

Lindsey's prominence was before the historical period. By the time of the first historical records of the kingdom, it had become a subjugated polity, under the alternating control of Northumbria and Mercia. Its subjugation may have occurred around AD 500. Its territories were absorbed into the historical English county of Lincolnshire, the northern part of which is called Lindsey.

=== Kings of Lindsey ===
The Anglian collection of genealogies, which was created in the last years of the reign of Offa of Mercia, gives a pedigree for Aldfrið, presumed to have been ruler of Lindsey. It traces him to the Anglo-Saxon god, Woden, likewise made ancestor of the other Anglo-Saxon dynasties, and provides Woden's ancestry for several further generations.

- Geot – Compare the Geats who are frequently mentioned in Beowulf's story.
- Godulf
- Finn
- Frioðulf
- Frealaf
- Woden "The God".
- Winta – Compare Winteringham (the homestead of Winta's people) and Winterton, Lincolnshire (the farm/village of Winta's people).
- Ida
- Cretta
- Cuelgils
- Caedbaed
- Bubba
- Beda Bubbing
- Biscop Beding
- Eanferð
- Eatta
- Aldfrið

None of the individuals can be securely dated, though the name Biscop, Old English for 'bishop', suggests a time after conversion. Likewise, the practice of agnatic inheritance akin to blood tanistry in the Anglo-Saxon kingdoms means that it cannot be determined which of the listed male-line ancestors of Aldfrið actually ruled the kingdom. Finally, it is uncertain at what point between Aldfrið and Woden the pedigree ceases to be historical, since this pedigree is the sole source for all of the individuals named, except perhaps Aldfrið. With regard to Aldfrið, Frank Stenton referred to the witness list for a charter which includes an "Ealfrid rex", and dated its writing to some time between the years 787 and 796. Scholars now believe that the name on the witness list should read "Ecgfrið Rex", and refers to Offa's son. He was anointed King of the Mercians in 787, nine years before his succession in 796, and would have been correctly styled rex. Stenton suggested that the name 'Biscop' came from the title 'bishop' and must post-date Paulinus's mission to Lindsey of 628 CE. But, as Sarah Foot has pointed out, Biscop does not need to have been derived from an external origin. The other genealogies in the Anglian collection close with historic personages whose dates are known, such as Edwin of Deira (616–33), Ethelred of Mercia (675–704) and Ethelbert II of Kent (725–62), but this wide range offers little help in dating Aldfrið.

== See also ==
- Lindisfaras
- Lindsey, Lincolnshire
- Bishop of Lindsey
