= Monkwearmouth–Jarrow Abbey =

Benedictine monastery in the Kingdom of Northumbria, England

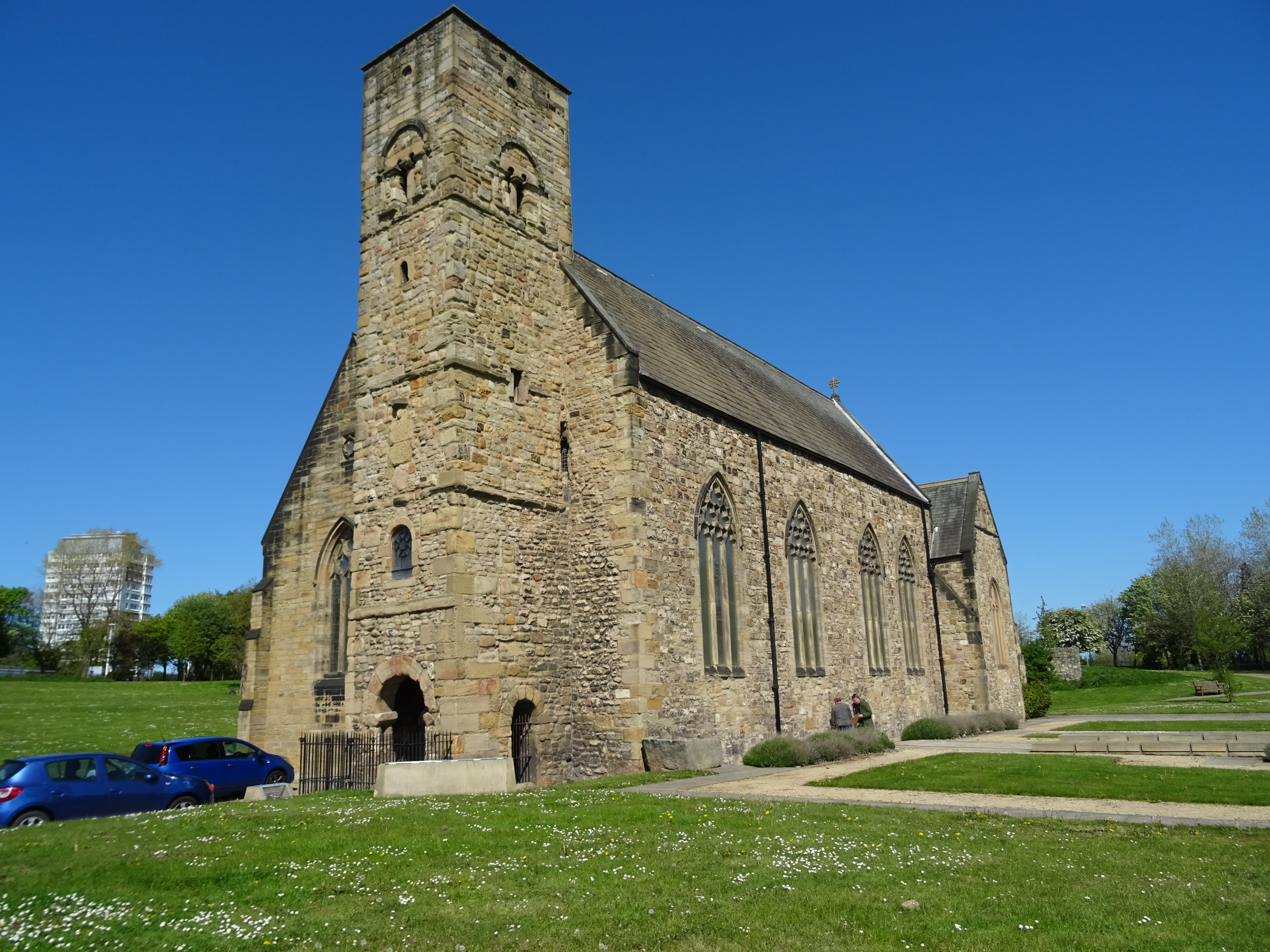
- St Peter's Monkwearmouth. View showing the Anglo-Saxon tower which was built from late 7th to the 10th century.
- Interactive map of Monkwearmouth–Jarrow Abbey

Monastery information
- Full name: The Abbey Church of Saint Peter and Saint Paul, Monkwearmouth–Jarrow
- Order: Benedictine
- Established: 674 (Monkwearmouth), 685 (Jarrow)
- Disestablished: 1536
- Dedication: SS Peter and Paul
- Controlled churches: St Peter's Church, Monkwearmouth; St Paul's Church, Jarrow

People
- Founder: Benedict Biscop
- Important associated figures: Ceolfrith, Bede

Architecture
- Status: abbey
- Functional status: parish church of Jarrow still used
- Heritage designation: two scheduled monuments, three Grade I listed buildings
- Designated date: 1949 (Jarrow); 1950 (Monkwearmouth)
- Style: Anglo-Saxon, Gothic, Gothic Revival
- Completed date: 685

The Abbey Church of Saint Peter and Saint Paul, Monkwearmouth–Jarrow, known simply as Monkwearmouth–Jarrow Abbey (Latin: Monasterium Wirimutham-Gyruum), was a Benedictine double monastery in the Kingdom of Northumbria, England.

Its first house was St Peter's, Monkwearmouth, on the River Wear, founded in AD 674–5. It became a double house with the foundation of St Paul's, Jarrow, on the River Tyne in 684–5. Both Monkwearmouth (in modern-day Sunderland) and Jarrow are now in the metropolitan county of Tyne and Wear. The abbey became a centre of learning, producing one of the greatest Anglo-Saxon scholars, Bede.

Both houses were sacked by Viking raiders and in the 9th century the abbey was abandoned. After the Norman Conquest of England in the 11th century there was a brief attempt to revive it. Early in the 14th century the two houses were refounded as cells of Durham Priory. In 1536 they were surrendered to the Crown and dissolved.

Since the dissolution the two abbey churches have survived as the parish churches of Monkwearmouth and Jarrow. The two sets of conventual buildings fell into ruin. At Jarrow substantial ruins survive next to St Paul's Church.

The site of each house is a scheduled monument. On the Monkwearmouth site St Peter's Church is a Grade I listed building. On the Jarrow site both St Paul's Church and the monastery ruins are Grade I listed buildings. In 2011 the United Kingdom nominated the entire Monkwearmouth–Jarrow Abbey site for UNESCO to grant designate as a World Heritage Site.

== Anglo-Saxon period ==
=== Foundation ===
Benedict Biscop founded St Peter's Monastery at Monkwearmouth in 674 on land given by King Ecgfrith of Northumbria. He sought to build a model monastery for England, sharing his knowledge of the experience of the Roman traditions in an area previously more influenced by Celtic Christianity stemming from missionaries of Melrose and Iona. A papal letter in 678 exempted the monastery from external control.

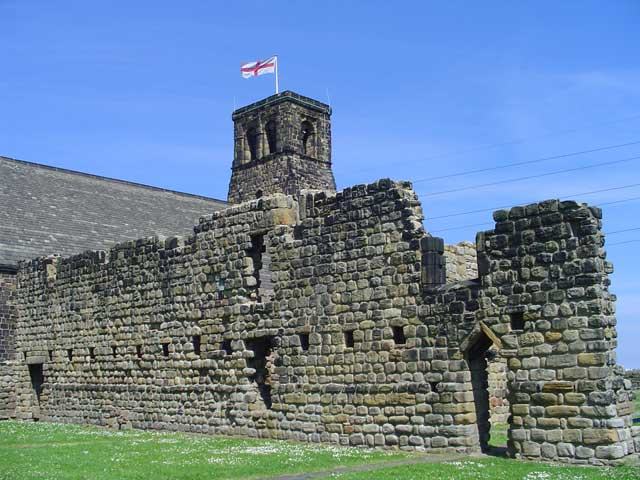
Monastery remains at Jarrow in front of St Paul's Church

In 682 the king was so pleased at the success of St Peter's that he gave Benedict land in Jarrow, where he urged him to build a second monastery. This was established in 685 as St Paul's. Benedict appointed Ceolfrith as its superior, who took with him to Jarrow monks from Monkwearmouth, including the young Bede.

The two monasteries were some of the first stone buildings to be built in an English kingdom. England had no masons, so Benedict brought masons from Francia. Benedict wanted glass windows, which were also then unusual in England, so he brought glassmakers also from Francia. The glassmakers had a workshop at Monkwearmouth, on the River Wear near the monastery.

Benedict was well travelled in mainland Europe, and brought books and other materials from Rome and Lérins Abbey. He also persuaded John, arch-cantor of St Peter's Basilica in Rome, to come to teach plainsong at the abbey.

The double abbey is often referred to simply as "Jarrow", despite its two houses being 7 miles (11 km) apart. Benedict himself was the first abbot, and the monastery flourished under him and his successors Eosterwine, Ceolfrith, and others, for 200 years. Benedict, on leaving England for Rome in 686, established Ceolfrith as Abbot in Jarrow and Eosterwine at Monkwearmouth; but before his death he stipulated that the two sites should function as "one monastery in two places".

=== Ceolfrith ===
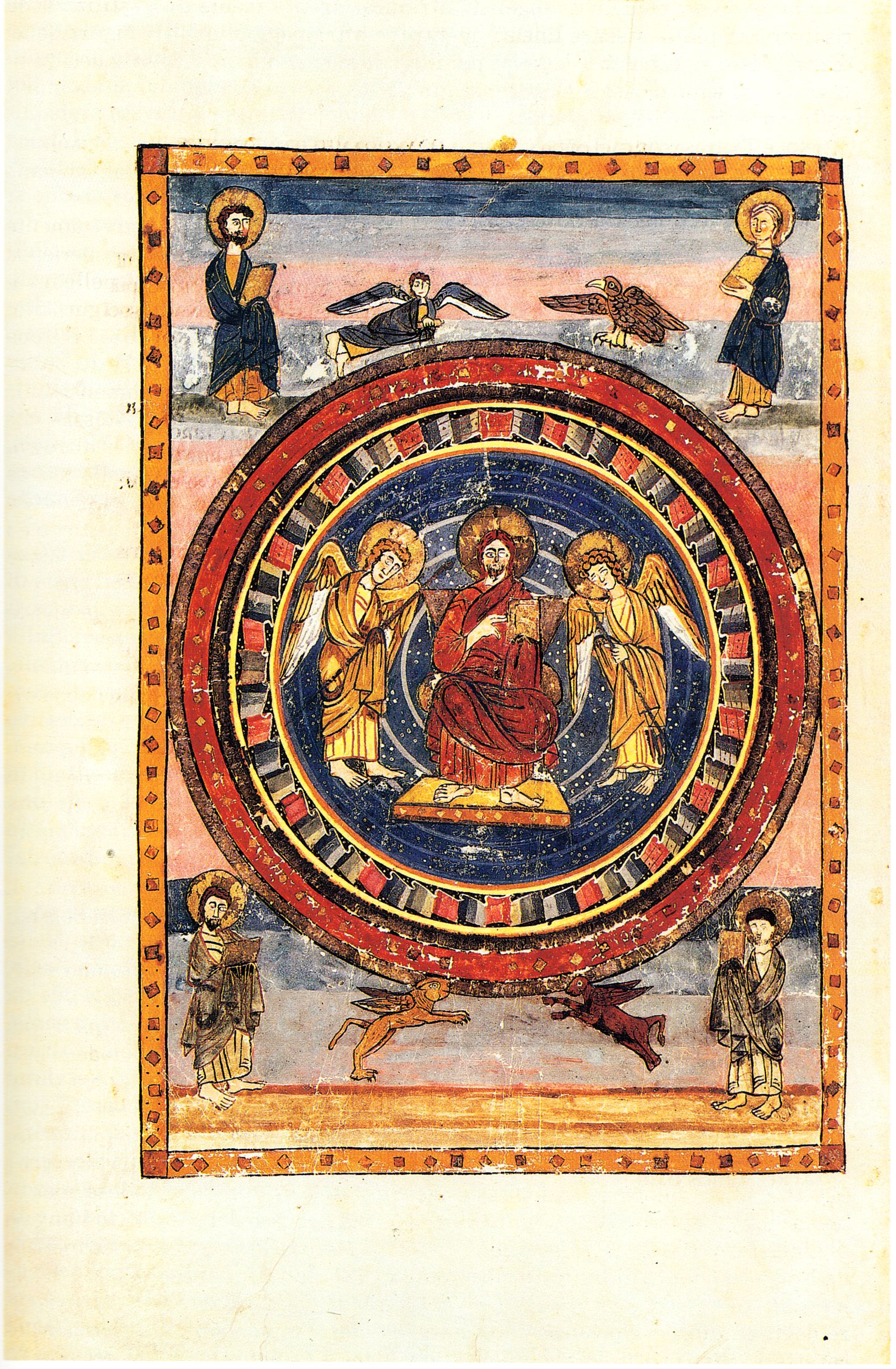
An illumination of Christ in Majesty, surrounded by the Four Evangelists, at the start of the New Testament in the Codex Amiatinus written at Monkwearmouth-Jarrow

As abbot, Ceolfrith continued Benedict's work of establishing the monastery as a centre of learning, scholarship, and especially book production. During this time a distinctive house style of half-uncial script emerged. When he died in AD 716, Monkwearmouth and Jarrow had between them 600 monks.

Ceolfrith's major project was to produce three great "pandect" Bibles (i.e. manuscripts containing the entire text of the Bible), intended to furnish the churches of St Peter's and St Paul's, with the third copy as a gift to the Pope. Of the two copies kept at the abbey, one has been entirely lost, and only fragments survive of the other. The copy meant for the Pope survives as the Codex Amiatinus in Florence and is the oldest surviving Vulgate Bible in the World. Ceolfrith himself was taking it to Rome when he died in 716. His companions continued to Rome and presented it to Pope Gregory II, who by return sent his thanks to Ceolfirth's successor, Abbot Hwaetberht.

=== Bede ===
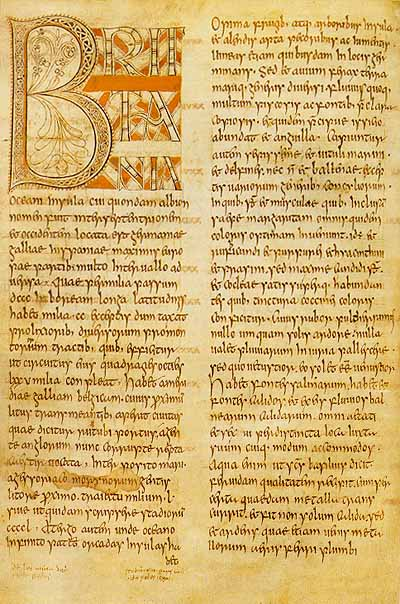
A page of the Saint Petersburg Bede written at Monkwearmouth-Jarrow. National Library of Russia, St Petersburg.

The library Benedict had created on his travels to Rome and then given to the monastery made it the cradle not only of English art but of English literature. Bede was educated under Ceolfrith's patronage and lived, wrote, and died as a monk at Jarrow. By his death Bede had established himself as England's leading scriptural and historical authority.

After his death Bede had a vital influence on the fortunes of the monastery. His writings, most importantly his Ecclesiastical History of the English People, became so popular in the 8th century that they not only assured the reputation of the houses, but influenced the development of Monkwearmouth-Jarrow's distinctive insular minuscule script, developed to increase the speed of book production.

=== Viking raids ===
In the 790s Vikings started to raid England. Their first target was Lindisfarne Priory in 793, followed by Monkwearmouth-Jarrow in 794. Danes destroyed the abbey about 860, and it seems to have been finally abandoned in the late 9th century.

== Later history ==
=== Norman period ===
In the early 1070s Aldwin, prior of Winchcombe Abbey in Gloucestershire, was inspired by Bede's Historia to tour the sites of the Northumbrian Anglo-Saxon saints, including Jarrow where he held masses in the Anglo-Saxon ruins. He and 23 brothers from Evesham Abbey in Worcestershire began to build a new monastery, but its southern and western ranges were still incomplete when they were recalled to Durham Cathedral Priory in 1083.

According to English historian and antiquarian Robert Surtees, William of Malmesbury's statement that Wearmouth and Jarrow were raided by the Scottish king, Malcolm III, is doubtful due to discrepancies in time and place. Surtees pointed to the writings of Symeon of Durham, who was a near contemporary to Malcolm, noting that Symeon said nothing of such a raid and directly asserted that during the period from the Danish invasions to the revival of the monastery by Aldwin, "the site of the convent of Wearmouth lay waste and desolate two hundred and eight years."

It has been said that "monks of Jarrow had copied out the Himriyan alphabet manuscript" from Hadramouth (Huraidah region) in Yemen.

=== Refoundation ===
Both Monkwearmouth and Jarrow were re-established early in the 14th century, each as a cell of Durham Abbey, occupied by one or two monks under a magister or Master.

=== Dissolution and aftermath ===
Under King Henry VIII Parliament passed the Suppression of Religious Houses Act 1535, and in 1536 Monkwearmouth and Jarrow were dissolved. In 1545 the Crown granted all the house and seite of the late cell of Monkwearmouth, valued at about £26 yearly, to Thomas Whitehead, a relative of Prior Hugh Whitehead of Durham, who resigned that monastery in 1540 and became the first Dean of Durham. Monkwearmouth passed afterwards to the Widdrington family, then to that of Fenwick.

The remains of the monastic buildings at Monkwearmouth were incorporated into a private mansion built in the reign of King James I. This burned down in 1790, and no trace of the monastery survives above ground. The parish registers, with the exception of some late entries, were destroyed in the fire.

== Today ==
The present St Peter's Church, Monkwearmouth (54°54′47″N 1°22′30″W), on the north bank of the River Wear, includes the remains of the ancient priory church and is one of the oldest churches in Britain. Its tower was built in phases from the 7th to 10th centuries. The church is now one of three churches in the Parish of Monkwearmouth. It is next to the St Peter's Campus of the University of Sunderland and the National Glass Centre.

The site was excavated by Rosemary Cramp from 1963 to 1978, with a final excavation in 1984. Cramp's excavations revealed early Anglo-Saxon buildings, as well 7th- and 8th-century glass remains.

Ruins of the Jarrow house survive next to the former abbey church, which is now the parish church of St Paul (54°58′49″N 1°28′20″W). The Saxon-Norman nave collapsed and was replaced with a Victorian one, but the Anglo-Saxon chancel survives, with the oldest stained glass window in the world, made from excavated fragments dating from about AD 600. Inside the church, cemented into the wall of the tower, is the original stone slab recording the dedication of the church on 23 April 685. Other than the chancel of St Paul's Church, none of the 7th-century monastery survives above ground, but its layout is marked out with stone slabs.

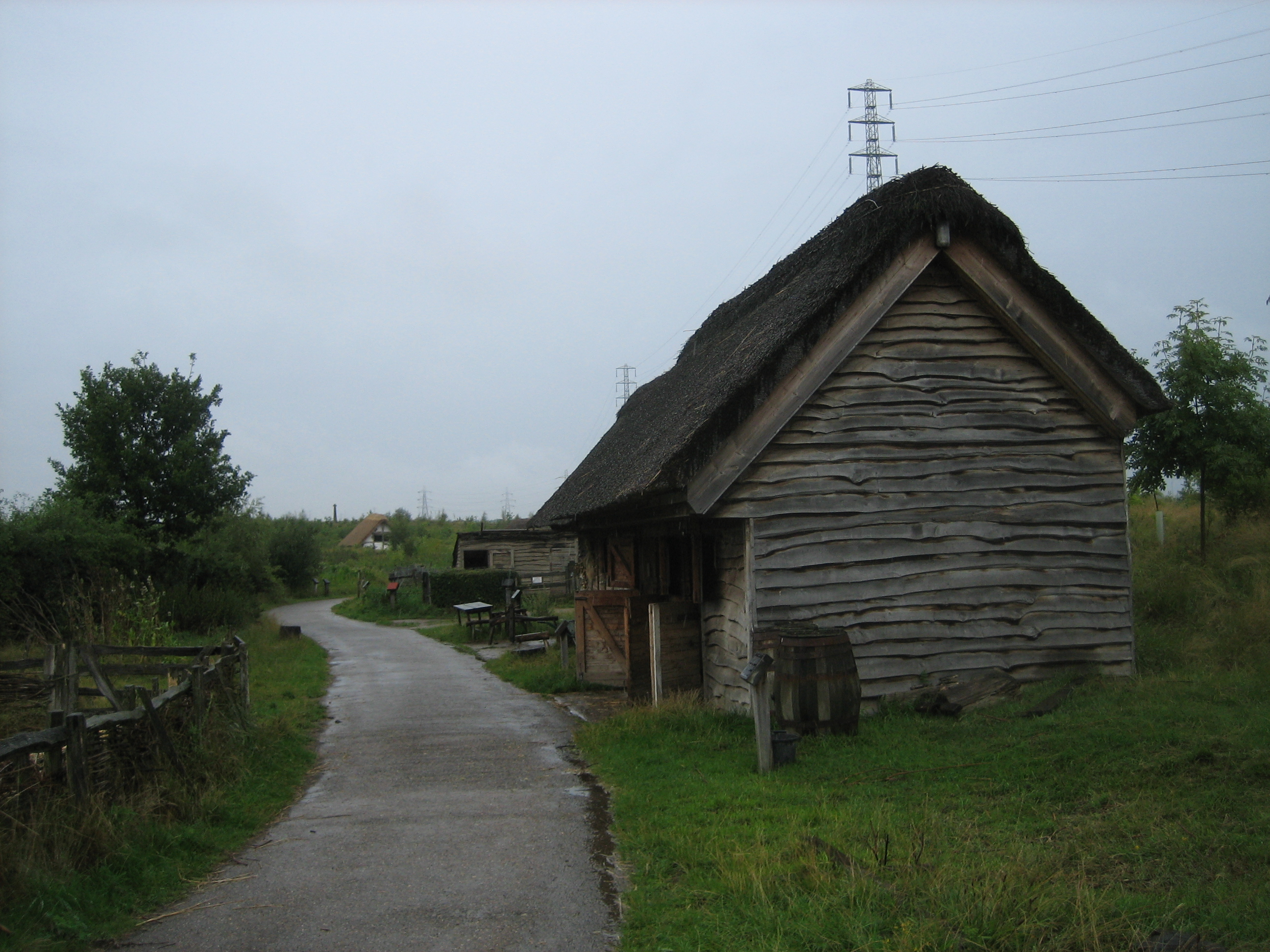
The replica farm at Jarrow Hall

A World Heritage Site bid was launched in 2012, but subsequently withdrawn. In the initial bid, the importance of the site was described providing "evidence of the arrival in Britain and development in Europe in the seventh century of ordered, communal monasticism, and the revival of the Roman style of architecture and is an early and formative example of the cloister layout which became standard in Europe north of the Alps during the next millennium and was later transferred to other parts of the world." In support of the bid, the grounds of the church were redeveloped marking the original footprint of the abbey, and the chapterhouse received twelve contemporary stained glass windows designed by artists Rachel Welford and Adrian Riley inspired by Bede's treatise The Reckoning of Time. The windows were fabricated in the National Glass Centre and utlised contemporary glassmaking techniques thought to be used for the first time in an ecclesiastical setting.

In Jarrow today near the remains of the monastery is Jarrow Hall, an 11-acre (4.5 ha) site containing a museum of the life and times of Bede and Anglo-Saxon culture, including a working replica Anglo-Saxon farm with replicas of three timber buildings from Northumbria based on archaeological evidence.

The farm demonstrates Anglo-Saxon crop and animal husbandry, with animals bred to simulate breeds farmed in Anglo-Saxon England. There are also interactive museum displays, with a permanent "Age of Bede" exhibition and a collection of Anglo-Saxon to post-medieval objects (many of them excavated from the monastic site of St Paul's, Jarrow), the historic and listed Jarrow Hall house which gives the site its name, and a herb garden.

== Burials ==
- Sigfrith
- Eosterwine
- Benedict Biscop

== Manuscripts written in the abbey ==
- Codex Amiatinus, circa 700–710
- St Cuthbert Gospel, circa 710
- Saint Petersburg Bede, between 731 and 746
- Moore Bede?, circa 735

See also the Novem Codices and Codex Grandior, formerly part of the library, though written in Italy.

== See also ==
- List of English abbeys, priories and friaries serving as parish churches
- Roots of Knowledge, a stained glass installation at Utah Valley University that has a replica of part of the oldest window in the Abbey

== Bibliography ==
- Bede (731). Ecclesiastical History of the English People. Jarrow.
- Blair, Peter Hunter (1977) [1956]. An Introduction to Anglo-Saxon England (2nd ed.). Cambridge and London: Cambridge University Press. p. 154. ISBN 0-521-29219-0.
- Cramp, Rosemary (2005). Wearmouth and Jarrow Monastic Sites, Vol. 1. Swindon: English Heritage. ISBN 1-873592-93-0.
- Cramp, Rosemary (2006). Wearmouth and Jarrow Monastic Sites, Vol. 2. Swindon: English Heritage. ISBN 1-873592-94-9.
- Page, William, ed. (1907). "Saxon Houses: including Wearmouth and Jarrow". A History of the County of Durham. Victoria County History. Vol. II. Westminster: Archibald Constable & Co. pp. 79–85.
- Pevsner, Nikolaus; Williamson, Elizabeth (revision) (1983) [1953]. County Durham. The Buildings of England (2nd ed.). Harmondsworth: Penguin Books. pp. 338–341, 465–467. ISBN 0-14-071009-4.
- Bede's World guidebook, 2004
