= Eosterwine =

Anglo-Saxon abbot and Saint

Saint Eosterwine

abbot
- Born: 650
- Died: 7 March 686 (aged 35–36); Wearmouth, England
- Venerated in: Roman Catholic Church; Orthodox Church
- Feast: 7 March

Eosterwine (or Easterwine) (650 – 7 March 686) was the second Abbot of Wearmouth (Sunderland) in Northumbria (England).

== Life ==
Descended from the noblest stock of Northumbria, as a young man he led the life of a soldier in the army of King Egfrid, the son of Oswy. When Eosterwine was twenty-four years old, he gave up the soldier's profession to become a monk in the monastery of Wearmouth, which was ruled by his cousin, Benedict Biscop.

Here he followed the regular observance, taking his full share in the menial tasks. He was ordained priest in the year 679, and in 682 St. Benedict appointed him abbot of Wearmouth as coadjutor to himself.

As superior "when he was compelled to reprove a fault, it was done with such tender sadness that the culprit felt himself incapable of any new offence which should bring a cloud over the benign brightness of that beloved face". In the year 686 a deadly pestilence overspread the country; it attacked the community at Wearmouth and the youthful abbot was one of its victims. He bade farewell to all, the day before he died on 7 March 686 at the age of 36 while the community was at Matins. He was subsequently revered as a saint. Saint Benedict was absent in Rome at the time of his death and Sigfried was chosen by the monks as his successor. Eosterwine is not known to have been the author of any works.

His feast day is 7 March.

Religious titles
Preceded by Benedict Biscop	Abbot of Monkwearmouth; 682–686	Succeeded by Sigfrith
