= Benedict Biscop =

7th-century Anglo-Saxon abbot

Saint Benedict Biscop Biscop Baducing
- Born: c. 628; Northumbria
- Died: 12 January 690; St Peter's, Wearmouth (Sunderland)
- Venerated in: Catholic Church; Church of England; Eastern Orthodox Church
- Major shrine: Wearmouth 690 – c. 980; translated c. 980 from there to Thorney Abbey (Glastonbury Abbey also claims his relics)
- Feast: 12 January (Anglican & Catholic)
- Patronage: English Benedictines, musicians, painters, and (since 24 March 2004) the City of Sunderland St Benet Biscop Catholic Academy in Northumberland

Benedict Biscop (c. 628 – 690), also known as Biscop Baducing, was an Anglo-Saxon abbot and founder of Monkwearmouth-Jarrow Priory (where he also founded the famous library). Following his death, he was canonized as a saint.

It has been suggested that Baducing appears as Biscop Beding, the son of Beda Bubbing, King of Mercia in the Lyndsey/Lindfearnan lists of geneaologies held by the Anglian Collection and great-grandfather of Alfred The Great.

== Life ==
=== Early career ===
Benedict, born of a noble Northumbrian family, was for a time a thegn of King Oswiu of Bernicia (r. 642–670) At the age of 25 (c. 653) Benedict made the first of his six trips to Rome,accompanying his friend Saint Wilfrid the Elder. However, Wilfrid was detained in Lyon en route. Benedict completed the journey on his own, and when he returned to England, he was "full of fervour and enthusiasm ... for the good of the English Church".

Benedict made a second journey to Rome twelve years later. Alchfrith of Deira, a son of King Oswiu, intended to accompany him, but the king refused to grant permission. On this trip, Biscop met Acca and Wilfrid. On his return journey to England, Benedict stopped at Lérins, a monastic island off the Mediterranean coast of Provence, which had by then adopted the Rule of St. Benedict. During his two-year stay there, from 665 to 667, he underwent a course of instruction, taking monastic vows and the name of "Benedict".

Following the two years in Lérins, Benedict made his third trip to Rome. At this time, Pope Vitalian commissioned him to accompany Archbishop Theodore of Tarsus back to Canterbury in 669. On their return, Archbishop Theodore appointed Benedict as abbot of SS. Peter and Paul's, Canterbury, a role he held for two years.

=== Bibliophile ===
Benedict Biscop, the Bibliophile, assembled a library from his travels. His second trip to Rome had focused on book-buying. Overall, the collection comprised an estimated 250 titles, mostly service books. The library included scripture, classical, and secular works.

=== Founder ===
Ecgfrith of Northumbria granted Benedict land in 674 for the purpose of building a monastery. He traveled to the Continent to recruit masons capable of building a monastery in the Pre-Romanesque style. Benedict made his fifth and final trip to Rome in 679 to bring back books for a library, saintly relics, stonemasons, glaziers, and a grant from Pope Agatho that conferred certain privileges on his monastery. Benedict made five overseas voyages in all to stock the library.

In 682, Benedict appointed Eosterwine as his coadjutor, and the King was so delighted by the success of St Peter's that he gave him land in Jarrow and urged him to build a second monastery. Benedict erected a sister foundation (St Paul) at Jarrow. He appointed Ceolfrid as the superior, who left Wearmouth with 20 monks to start the foundation in Jarrow. Bede, one of Benedict's pupils, tells us that he brought builders and glass-workers from Francia to erect the buildings in stone.

He drew up a rule for his community, based on that of Benedict and the customs of seventeen monasteries he had visited. He also engaged Abbot John, Arch-cantor of St. Peter's in Rome, to teach Roman chant at these monasteries.

In 685, Ecgfrith granted the land south of the River Wear to Biscop. Separated from the monastery, this would be known as the "sundered land," which in time would become the name of the wider urban area.

Benedict's idea was to establish a model monastery in England, drawing on his knowledge of the Church's experience in Europe. It was the first ecclesiastical building in Britain constructed in stone, and the use of glass was a novelty in 7th-century England. It eventually possessed what was a large library for the time – several hundred volumes – and it was here that Benedict's student Bede wrote his famous works. The library became world-famous, and manuscripts copied there became prized possessions throughout Europe. including especially the Codex Amiatinus, the earliest surviving manuscript of the complete Bible in the Latin Vulgate version.

=== Death ===
For the last three years of his life, Benedict was bedridden. He suffered his affliction with great patience and faith. He died on 12 January 690.

=== Veneration ===
A sermon of Bede (Homily 17) indicates that there was a very early public cult of Biscop; for his feast, but it became more widespread only after the translation of his relics to Thorney under Ethelwold c. 980. He is recognised as a saint by the Catholic Church, the Church of England, and the Eastern Orthodox Church, which hold his feast day on 12 January.

Benedict is remembered in the Church of England with a commemoration on 12 January. The parish church in Wombourne, Staffordshire is the only one in England dedicated to Benedict.

The Eastern Orthodox Church venerates him as a saint and celebrates his feast day on 12 January on the New Calendar.

== Sources ==
- Coates, S. J. (2004). "Benedict Biscop [St Benedict Biscop] (c. 628–689)". Oxford Dictionary of National Biography. Oxford University Press. doi:10.1093/ref:odnb/2082. (subscription, Wikipedia Library access or UK public library membership required)
- Stephens, William Richard Wood (1885). "Benedict Biscop" . In Stephen, Leslie (ed.). Dictionary of National Biography. Vol. 4. London: Smith, Elder & Co.
- Wikisource:Ecclesiastical History of the English People/Book 4#18
- Wikisource:Ecclesiastical History of the English People/Book 5#19
- Wikisource:Ecclesiastical History of the English People/Book 5#21
- HAbb Bede, Lives of the Abbots of Wearmouth and Jarrow
- Attwater, Donald and Catherine Rachel John. The Penguin Dictionary of Saints. 3rd edition. New York: Penguin Books, 1993. ISBN 0-14-051312-4.
- Bede's World guidebook, 2004
- AVCeol: Anonymous, "Life of Abbot Ceolfrith" in Webb & Farmer (eds), The Age of Bede. London: Penguin, 1983. ISBN 0-14-044727-X
- Blair, Peter Hunter, The World of Bede. Cambridge: Cambridge University Press, 1970. ISBN 0-521-39138-5.
- Benedict Biscop at Catholic Forum
- Hutchison-Hall, John (Ellsworth) (2013). Orthodox Saints of the British Isles. Vol. I - January-March. United States of America: St. Eadfrith Press. ISBN 978-0-615-92580-6.

Preceded by —	Abbot of Monkwearmouth; 674–681	Succeeded by Eosterwine
