= Monkwearmouth =

Area of Sunderland, England

Coordinates: 54.9146°N 1.3825°W

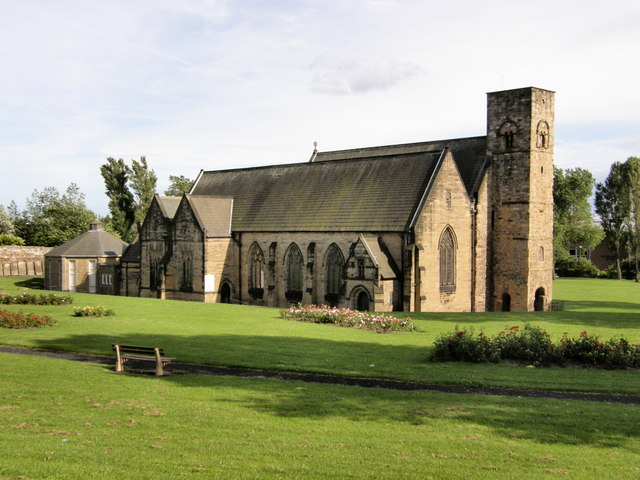
- St Peter's Church

- Location within Tyne and Wear
- OS grid reference: NZ350549
- Metropolitan borough: Sunderland
- Metropolitan county: Tyne and Wear
- Region: North East
- Country: England
- Sovereign state: United Kingdom
- Post town: SUNDERLAND
- Postcode district: SR5, SR6
- Dialling code: 0191
- Police: Northumbria
- Fire: Tyne and Wear
- Ambulance: North East
- UK Parliament: Sunderland Central

Monkwearmouth is an area of Sunderland, Tyne and Wear in England. Monkwearmouth is at the north side of the mouth of the River Wear. It was one of the three original settlements on the banks of the River Wear along with Bishopwearmouth and Sunderland. It includes the area around St. Peter's Church, founded in 674 as part of Monkwearmouth-Jarrow Abbey, and was once the main centre of Wearside shipbuilding and coalmining in the town. It is now host to a campus of the University of Sunderland and the National Glass Centre. It is served by the three Church of England churches of the Parish of Monkwearmouth. The first nineteenth-century Catholic church built in Monkwearmouth was St Benet's Church which remains active today.

Monkwearmouth is across the river from the Port of Sunderland at Sunderland Docks.

The locals of the area were called "Barbary Coasters". The borough stretches from Wearmouth Bridge to the harbour mouth on the north side of the river and is one of the oldest parts of Sunderland.

The former railway station, closed in 1968 by the Beeching Axe, is now the Monkwearmouth Station Museum and features a restored booking office dating from the Edwardian period. Since 2002, Monkwearmouth has once again been served by rail transport, this time via St Peter's Tyne and Wear Metro station a few hundred metres south of the old station.

Wearmouth Colliery, a coal mine, was closed in December 1993 after it had been in operation for over 100 years. The site is now the home of the Stadium of Light, which opened in July 1997 and is the home of the football club Sunderland A.F.C., who had previously played at Roker Park.

Monkwearmouth was part of the Sunderland North parliamentary constituency for elections to the House of Commons of the United Kingdom. Monkwearmouth is now part of Sunderland Central.

In 1891 the civil parish had a population of 9116. On 25 March 1897 the parish was abolished and merged with Sunderland. In 1974 it became part of the metropolitan district of Sunderland.

== Shipbuilding ==
In 1781-82, two warships, Achilles and Bucephalus, were built by Messrs Thomas Dixon and James Stafford at Monkwearmouth Shore. In 1793, John and Philip Laing from Fife established a shipyard at Monkwearmouth Shore. In 1807, Luke Crown started a shipyard at Monkwearmouth Shore. In 1818, John and Philip Laing moved their shipyard from Monkwearmouth Shore to Deptford yard in Sunderland. In 1826, Peter Austin (SP Austin & Sons) opened a shipyard at Monkwearmouth Shore,, however, in 1846 they moved their yard across the river to a site near Wearmouth Bridge. In 1852, John Dickinson & Sons opened an engineering works at Palmer's Hill, near Bonnesfield, Monkwearmouth

== Sources ==
- Clark, Andrew (2002). The People's History - Sunderland Shipyards. Seaham: The People's History Ltd. ISBN 1-902527-00-3.
- Dodds, Glen Lyndon (2011). A History of Sunderland (Third ed.). Sunderland: Albion Press. ISBN 978-0-9525122-2-6.
