= Paul Scott =

Paul Scott may refer to:

== Sports ==
- Paul Scott (rugby union) (1872-1950), South African rugby union player
- Paul Scott (cricketer) (born 1962), English cricketer
- Paul Scott (decathlete) (born 1970), Australian decathlete and competitor at the 1991 World Championships
- Paul Scott (footballer, born 1979), English football player for Huddersfield, Bury and Morecambe
- Paul Scott (footballer, born 1985), English football player for Burnley

== Other ==
- Paul Scott (artist), English ceramist
- Paul Scott (novelist) (1920–1978), English novelist, playwright, and poet
- Paul B Scott (born 1975), Jamaican businessman, investor and philanthropist
- Paul H. Scott (born 1982), American politician from Michigan
- Paul Scott (comics), English comic book writer
- Paul Scott (poet), British poet
- Paul Scott (Oklahoma politician), American state senator from Oklahoma
- Paul Scott (North Carolina politician), American state representative from North Carolina
