= Institute for International Research in Glass =

Glass research centre at University of Sunderland

Coordinates: 54.913°N 1.385°W

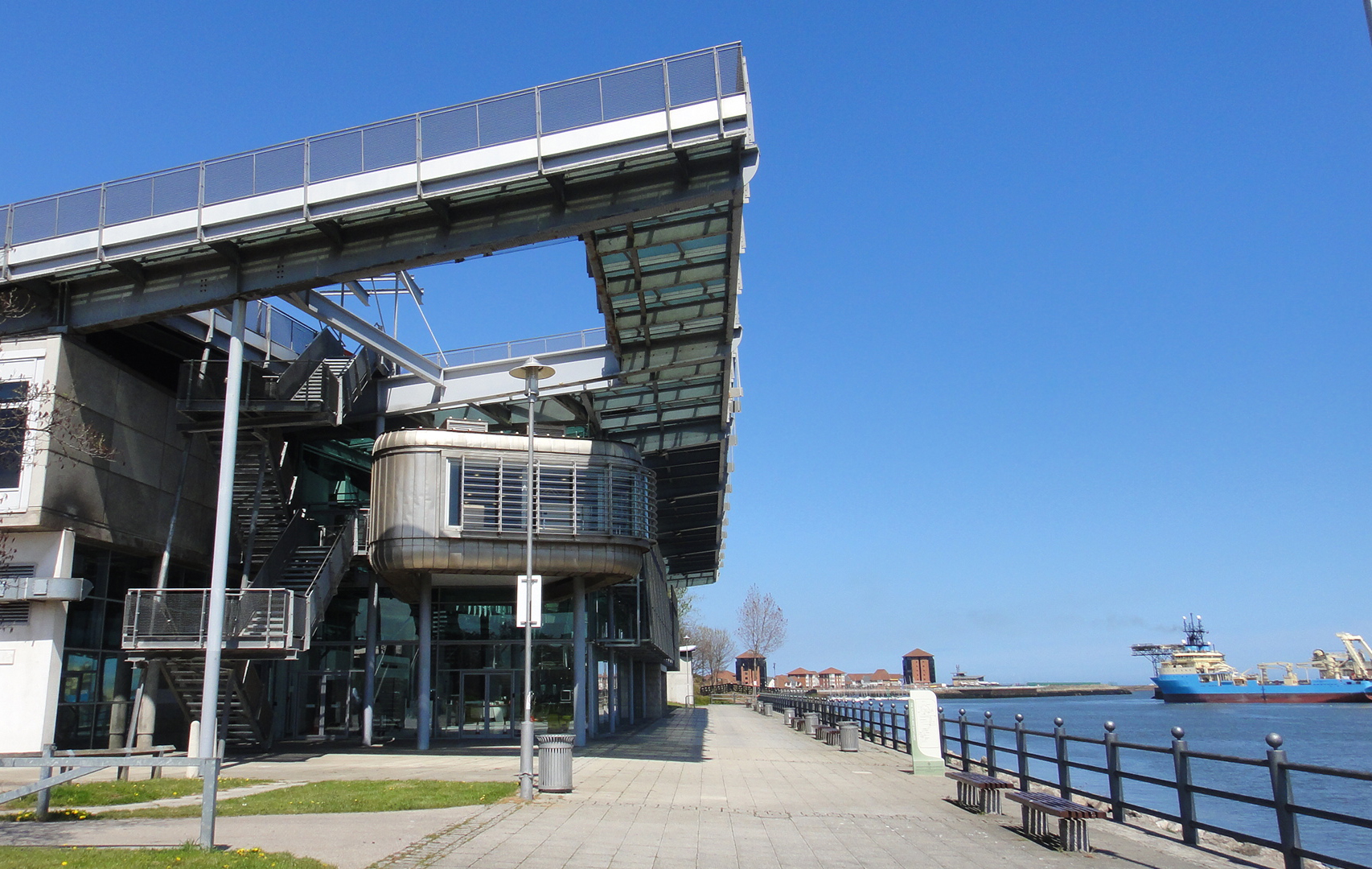
National Glass Centre by Heike Brachlow

The Institute for International Research in Glass (or IIRG) promotes and facilitates research in Glass at a national and international level. It is part of the University of Sunderland, located in the National Glass Centre on the bank of the river Wear.

== History ==
Planning of IIRG began in 1996, spurred on by the "international rating" achieved in the last Research Assessment Exercise, where glass research received a special mention. Research funding was won from various sources, and two full-time professorial posts in Glass were created, which were taken up by Dan Klein and Zora Palová. IIRG was launched in June 1998 to complement the National Glass Centre, which was opened in October of the same year by HRH Prince Charles. IIRG was the first research centre of the Art and Design faculty of the University of Sunderland. Professor Sylva Petrova, formerly curator of 20th Century Glass at the Museum of Decorative Arts in Prague and deputy director of the museum, became IIRG's first director. When Petrova retired in 2012, she was succeeded by Dr. Kevin Petrie.

== Aims ==
- To develop new knowledge relevant to contemporary glass practice, and to explore diverse means of disseminating that information through exhibitions, residencies, master classes, workshops, and publications
- to provide an interface between high level practice in glass and artists working in other media, students, and the public.
- To offer a forum for debate and inquiry on contemporary and historical issues in glass.
- To foster the development of postgraduate research degrees in glass.

== Research ==
IIRG researches, publishes, and provides lectures about a wide range of glass topics. It facilitates research of new glass methods and technologies and encourages academic work on contemporary and historical glass.

== Programme ==
IIRG regularly organises conferences and seminars about a variety of glass-related topics, including a biannual research conference for ceramics and glass titled Parallels and Connections. It is also involved in activities such as workshops, master classes, publications, exhibitions, residencies, consultancy, project management and commissions.

== Exhibitions ==
IIRG has curated various exhibitions in the UK, Czech Republic, Japan, Slovak Republic, Croatia, and Singapore. It is involved in organising research-related exhibitions at the national glass centre, such as Wheel and Water grind an Edge in 2005 and Kith and Kin: New Glass and Ceramics, a series of two exhibitions in 2012 and 2013.

== IIRG Professors ==
- Kevin Petrie (2012-)
- Peter Davies
- Sylva Petrova (1998-2012)
- Dan Klein (1996-1998)

IIRG Visiting Professors

- Zora Palova (2010-)
- Oiva Toikka (2005)
- Bertil Vallien (2000)
- Stephen Procter (2000)
- Stepan Pala
- Jiri Harcuba (1999)
- Dan Klein (1998)

== Fellows ==
IIRG Fellows: Katharine Dowson (2013), Richard Meitner (2005)

Leverhulme Visiting Fellow:

- Scott Chaseling (2006-7)

Research Councils UK Academic Fellowships:

- Jeffrey Sarmiento (2006–11)
- Dr Vanessa Cutler (2006-8)

== Visiting artists ==
IIRG Projects

Robert Kesseler (2013), Richard Slee (2013), Bruce McLean(2013), Wendy Ramshaw, Gijs Baker (2013), Graham Dolphin (2013), Markku Salo, Claire Barclay, Kristina Niedderer, Stefan Gec (2004), Shelley James (2005-6), Janine Goldsworthy

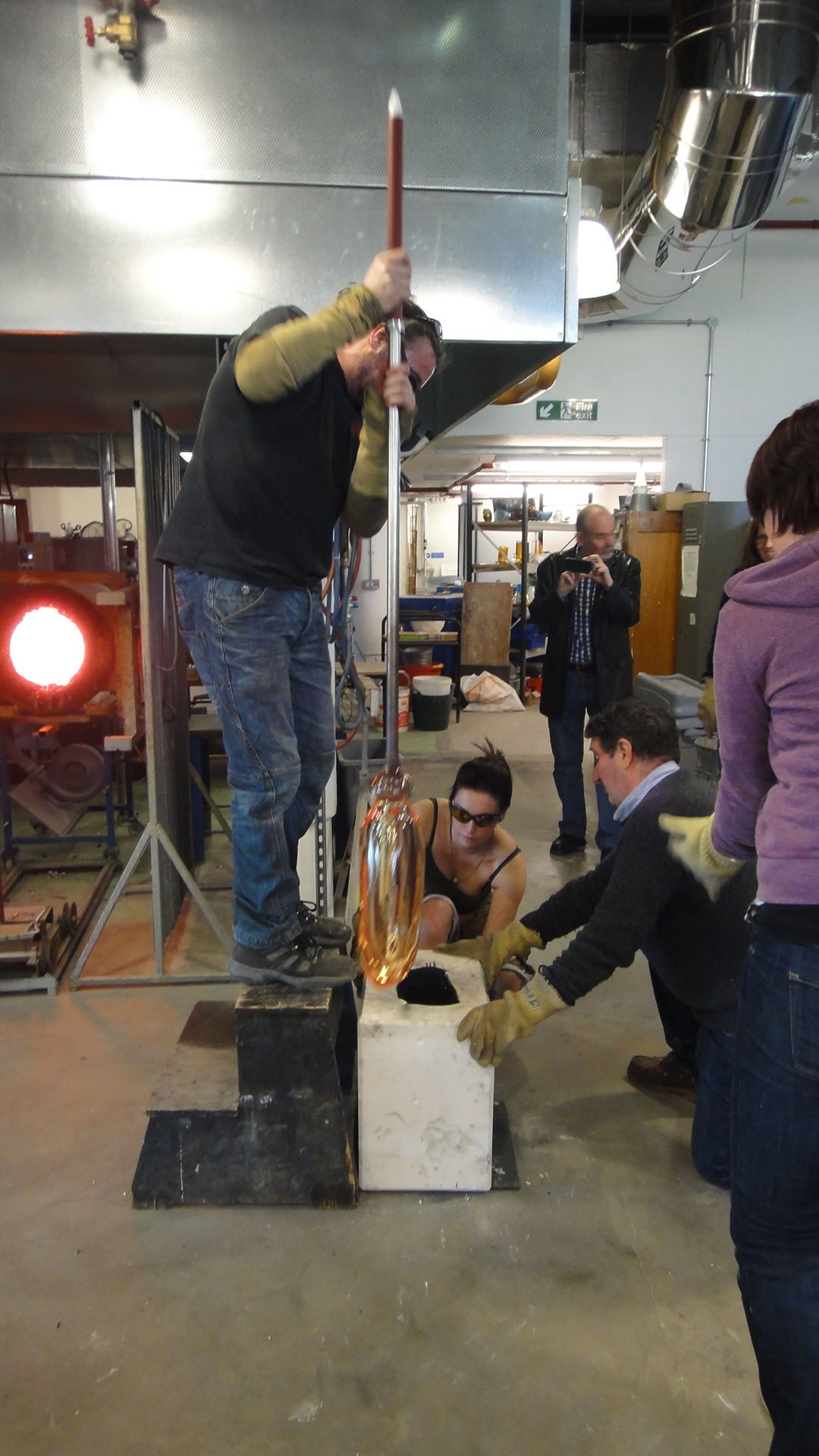
James Maskrey and team blowing glass for Bruce McLean, April 2013

Next Move Artists in Residence (Crafts Council)

Shannon Clegg (Ceramics, 2007–9), Mimi Joung (Ceramics, 2005–7), Kathryn Wightman (Glass, 2005–7)

Artists Access to Art Colleges AA2A Artist Placements

2012/13: Anna Mlasowsky (Glass: installation), Janis Miltenberger (Glass: lampworking), Maret Sarapu (Glass), Stine Bidstrup (Glass) 2011/12: Lianne Mary Bell (Ceramics: sculpture), Amanda Simmons (Glass:slumping), Kateriine Rikken (Glass), Emer Lynch (Glass: large scale) 2010/11: Rachel O'Dell (Glass: casting), Rachel Welford (Glass: architectural), Jenny Pope (Ceramics), Catherine Keenan (Glass: colour overlay), Meinir Wyn Jones (Ceramics) 2009/10: Joel Fisher (Ceramics: sculpture), Paul Grimmer (Ceramics: tile sculpture), Christopher McHugh (Glass: kiln formed), Andrea Walsh (Combining ceramics and glass) 2008/9 Jennifer Allison (Ceramics: Combining of materials), Carrie Fertig (Glass: lampworking installation), Patricia Niemann (Glass: sculptural body adornment), Bettina Nissen (Ceramics: design) 2007/8: Richard Wheater (Glass: chandelier), Zöe Garner (Glass: lampworking) 2006/7: Chris Donnelly (Ceramics: Development of specific silk screen process), Pia Raeymaekers (Glass: kiln-formed)

IIRG Residencies

- Tim Tate, Michael Janis (2012, Fulbright Specialist programme)
- Qu Jin (2012)
- Ann Vibeke Mou (2006-7)
- Philip Vickery (2006-7)
- Hannah Kippax (2005-6)
- Katharine Dowson 2005
- Louise Gilbert-Scott, Ruth Dupres, Anne Brodie (2004-5)
- Lukas Mjartan (2004)
- Alena Matejkova (2003-4)
- Colin Rennie (2002)
- Bibi Smit
- Catherine Forsyth
- David Flower
- Julian Ewart
- Stephanie Moore, Dena Bagi, Tom Jackson,
- Claire Morgan

Poet in Residence

- Catherine Byron (2005-6)

== Sources ==
- Davies, Peter. Glass North East (2007), Sunderland: Art Editions North.
- Areas of Research at the University of Sunderland, University of Sunderland. Accessed 8 April 2013, archived 20 January 2012.
