= Kevin Petrie =

Kevin Petrie (born 1970) is a practicing artist, author, and Professor of Glass and Ceramics at The National Glass Centre, University of Sunderland.

== Education ==
Petrie studied BA (Hons) Illustration at the University of Westminster (1993) and MA Ceramics and Glass (1995) at the Royal College of Art. He holds a Ph.D. ‘Water-based ceramic transfer printing’ from the Centre for Fine Print Research, University of the West of England, Bristol (1999).

== Academic and professional career ==
Petrie leads the academic team in glass and ceramics at the University of Sunderland which delivers BA(Hons) Glass and Ceramics, MA Glass, MA Ceramics and research degrees, and manages staff teaching the Foundation in Art and Design programme. As Programme Leader for MA Glass at Sunderland 2003-2011, Petrie developed MA Ceramics. He was appointed ‘Professor of Glass and Ceramics’ in 2008 and ‘Team Leader for Glass and Ceramics’ 2010. As a member of the National Glass Centre (NGC) Senior Management Group, Petrie is one of five senior managers leading the strategic management of the NGC, which is a national visitor attraction, gallery, production centre and research/academic department. He is also a member of the Faculty of Arts, Design and Media Management Group that manages the wider faculty, of which NGC is a part, and sits on the university Academic Experience Committee that develops academic policy for the institution as whole. Petrie is a member of the Arts and Humanities Research Council Peer Review College and was awarded a National Teaching Fellowship for his postgraduate teaching. Kevin Petrie has been invited to teach and lecture in Australia, Hong Kong, China, Thailand, Denmark, USA, Germany and Canada.

== Research interests ==
Petrie is known for blending printmaking and glass/ceramics for creative use. This includes the development of new processes and the dissemination of new practice internationally. He has written two books on the subject - Glass and Print and Ceramic Transfer Printing - and published a number of articles in key journals.

As well as his personal research, Petrie has supported the development of a large cohort of research students in glass and ceramics at Sunderland (c30). He has supervised PhD and MPhil projects and examined PhDs across the UK, as well as in Sweden and Australia. He has also developed the successful ‘Parallels and Connections - Ceramics and Glass Research conferences’ since 2007, which have offered important opportunities for international researchers to share and disseminate ideas.

Prof Petrie is Director of the Institute for International Research in Glass (IIRG), which facilitates new approaches to creative glass and its contextualization. As part of this he has recently worked on the curation of two linked exhibitions at the National Glass Centre (with Professor Peter Davies) – Kith and Kin I and Kith and Kin II – which presented new work in glass and ceramics, much of which was supported by the technical and research expertise of the glass and ceramics academic team at the National Glass Centre. Petrie is currently curating (with NGC Head of Arts Julia Stephenson) a major retrospective of the German artist Erwin Eisch, who is known for his pioneering work in creative glass.

== Artwork ==
Petrie is an exhibiting artist working in ceramics, glass, drawing and, more recently, painting. His work, often focused on landscape, has featured in a number of books including Contemporary Kiln Formed Glass - A World Survey by Keith Cummings and Drawing and Making by Kyra Cane.

== Authored books ==
PETRIE, K., 2011. Ceramic Transfer Printing. London: A&C Black Ltd and Ohio: American Ceramic Circle. ISBN 978-1-408-11328-8 PETRIE, K., 2006. Glass and Print. London: A&C Black and Pennsylvania: University of Pennsylvania Press USA. ISBN 0-7136-6491-6. 128 pages.

== Bibliography ==
- CANE, K. 2013. Making and Drawing. London: A&C Black (Publishers) Ltd
- CUMMINGS, C. 2009. Contemporary Kiln Formed Glass. London; A&C Black (Publishers) Ltd and USA: University of Pennsylvania Press.
- SCOTT, P. 2004. Ceramics and Print. London: A&C Black (Publishers) Ltd and USA: University of Pennsylvania Press. 2nd Ed. ISBN 0-7136-5485-6.
- MATIEU, P. 2003. Sex Pots, Eroticism in Ceramics. London: A&C Black (Publishers) Ltd, ISBN 07136-5804-5.
- HOSKINS, S. 2001. Water-based Screenprinting. London: A&C Black (Publishers) Ltd, ISBN 0713650559
- SCOTT, P. 2001. Painted Clay Graphic Arts & the Ceramic Surface. London: A&C Black (Publishers) Ltd. ISBN 071364754X
