= David Sadler (geographer) =

British geographer

David Sadler (born 1960) is a professor and a researcher of human geography.

== Biography ==
He grew up in Nottingham, where he attended Nottingham High School, and gained a Geography degree from Durham University (University College) in 1981. He was awarded a doctorate at the same institution in 1986, with a thesis entitled “Born in a steel town: class relations and the decline of the European Community steel industry since 1974”. He held academic posts at Saint David’s University College, Lampeter (University of Wales, Lampeter), and at the University of Durham, before being appointed Professor of Economic Geography at the University of Liverpool in 2002.

At Liverpool, he was Head of the Department of Geography from 2004 to 2007, and Dean of the Faculty of Social and Environmental Studies from 2007 to 2009. In 2010 he was appointed as Vice President for Academic Affairs at Xi’an Jiaotong-Liverpool University in Suzhou, China, a post he held until 2014. In that year, he joined Queen Mary University of London as its first Vice Principal (International), continuing in that role until 2017.

In 2020, he was appointed Provost of the University of Birmingham Dubai Campus.

As a geographer, he has published widely on the relationships between industrial change and regional development. He was a founding editor of the journal “European Urban and Regional Studies”. He has authored six books and around 80 journal articles, book chapters and reports.

He was married to the late Jeanette Henderson (1953-2019), a mental health academic, most recently of the Open University in the UK.

== See also ==
- Lampeter Geography School
