= Bibi Smit =

Dutch glass artist and designer (born 1965)

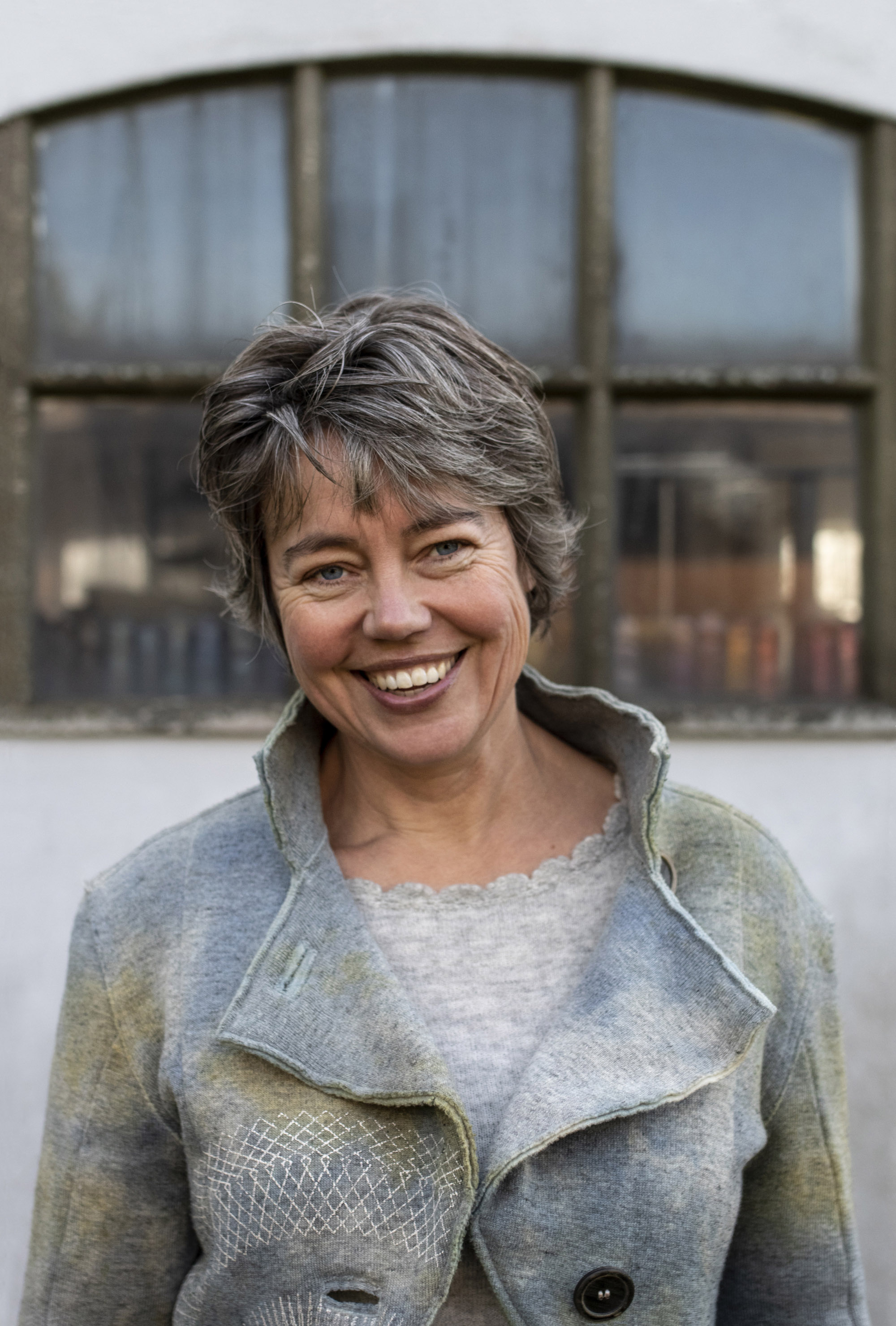
- Born: 1965 (age 60–61); Son en Breugel
- Education: West Surrey College of Art and Design
- Known for: Contemporary Art

Bibi Smit (born 1965) is a Dutch contemporary artist known for creating objects and installations that explore the patterns and rhythms caused by movement in nature. The process of making is a fundamental quality of her artistic practice.

== Early life and education ==
Bibi Smit moved in 1984 to England to study at the West Surrey College of Art and Design. During her degree, she did an internship with Willem Heesen at De Oude Horn, in Leerdam. From 1988 to 1989, she worked as a glassblowing assistant with David Kaplan and Annica Sandstrom at Lindean Mill Glass, Scotland. She established a small studio with equipment for grinding and polishing, whilst blowing her glass objects at Edinburgh College of Art and a hire furnace in Newcastle upon Tyne. In 1997, she attended a workshop at North Lands Creative in Lybster and participated in the next year at the Summer Glass Studio in the Leerdam Glass Center. Since 2006, she works in her glassblowing studio in the Netherlands.

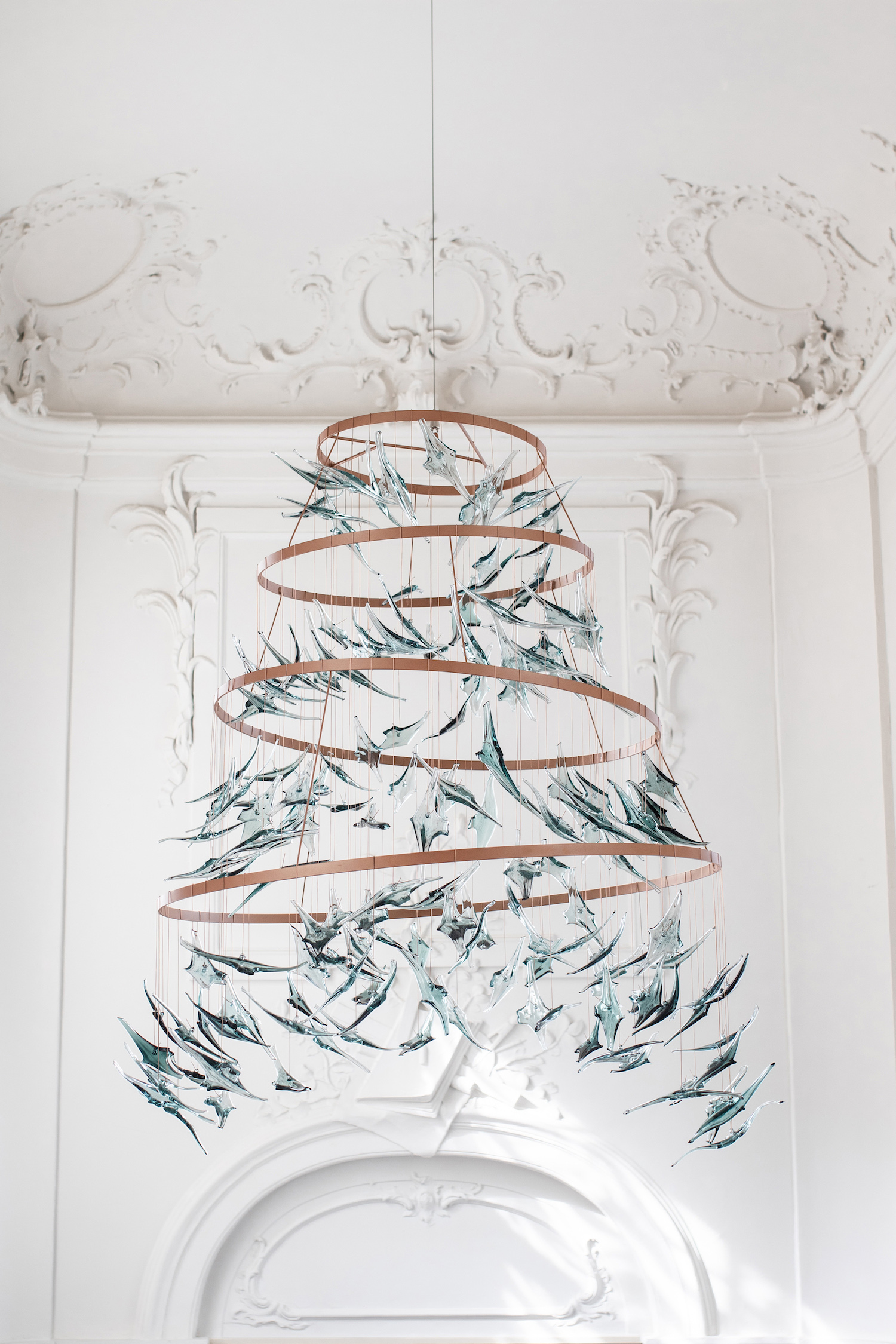
Swarms, Height 150 cm. Photograph by Annemarie Sabelis

== Artistic career ==
Smit received her Bachelor of Arts Honours degree in 3D Design Glass in 1988. In the same year, Two Double-Bubble Vases were selected for “New Glass Review 9”, a publication of the Corning Museum of Glass. Since her early career, she lectured in European studios and at the Edinburgh College of Art and the University of Sunderland. After living fourteen years in the United Kingdom, Smit moved back to Amsterdam, The Netherlands. She was a guest lecturer at Danmarks Designskole, in Copenhagen, in 1996.

She was the co-coordinator and head teacher of the Hot Glass workshop programme at Van Tetterode Glasobjecten in Amsterdam from 1998 to 2006. In 1999, she led the 2nd International Glass Workshop for Women at Häme Polytechnic/Wetterhof School of Craft and Design, in Nuutajärvi (Finland), where 14 participants from Finland, England, the USA, and Norway and a visiting group from Russia worked alongside sharing ideas, developing outdoor installations. In 2000, Smit was invited to participate at the Lednické Rovne International Glass Symposium, in Slovak Republic

In 2002, Smit was invited to make the "Ledenobject" of the Friends of Modern Glass and selected for an artist residency at North Lands Creative, in Scotland during the following year. Between 2005 and 2012, she was also a board member of the Friends of Modern Glass. During the Glasrijk Tubbergen International Glass Art event in 2013, Smit presented a series of pieces inspired by the solar flares and trees shapes, examining the relationship between shape and deformation in glass. According to the director of the National Glass Museum, Arend-Jan Weijsters, her work becomes strong in the unusual intersection between the simplicity of form and the mysterious appearance.

Since 2016, her work has been selected for the Dutch pavilion during the Salone del Mobile in Milan, curated by Nicole Uniquole. In 2019, she showcased “Swarms” and a series of sculptures in a presentation, which was inspired by the light and colour palette of the master painter Rembrandt van Rijn. The fragile glass birds suggested the movement of large flocks of starlings. She is called la Venini dei Paesi Bassi, which means the Venini of the Low Countries, referring to the famous Venetian glass designer and namesake of the largest glass factory in glass, in Murano. In 2018, Smit presented the Copier Unveiled, a new series for the "Copier Revisited" collection at Royal Leerdam Crystal.

In 2023, Smit installed the "Whirl of life" in the Mauritshuis for its 200th birthday. The installation was commissioned in 2022 by the Friends of the Mauritshuis Foundation and is inspired by the 19th century's paintings of the museum's collection. Located in the atrium, the artwork stands 6 meters high, in the form of a spiral and consists of 233 elements.

== Works ==
Smit’s works were deeply influenced by the Scottish landscape, nature and light. Since that period, she developed an interest in making works that interacted with its environment, particularly inspired by the spaces outside of her studio, nature and the experience of certain spaces. The similarities of forces in nature and in her own body are mirrored in the objects she produces, connecting memories with different realities. Her characteristic language is grounded in the combination of hot and cold techniques, such as grinding, cutting, sandblasting and polishing. According to Caroline van Diest, Smit’s language “is not a language of words, but of symbols and colours. It is born from feelings, personal symbols and memories. It is the rapture of the beauty of nature or life itself. Making glass objects is a way to understand herself and life.” She combined glass with other materials like wood, copper foil or different types of stone in autonomous objects. Her work has increasingly been connected to nature and the material itself, in the search for beauty and eagerness to achieve new knowledge about glass fluidity and movement.

== Collections ==
Smit’s work is held in private and public collections: Mauritshuis, The Netherlands; The Dan Klein and Alan J. Poole Private Collection of Glass, England; Collection North Lands Creative Glass, Lybster, Scotland; National Museum of Scotland, United Kingdom; Glasmuseum Lette Alter Hof Herding, Ernsting-Stiftung, Coesfeld, Germany.
