= Paul Scott (artist) =

English artist, writer and educator

Paul Scott is an English artist, author, and educator, best known for his work in ceramics. His studio practice draws upon the history and visual language of blue and white transfer-printed pottery, which he adapts to address contemporary political, environmental, and social subjects. Scott has also written extensively on printmaking and surface decoration techniques in ceramics. His publications include Ceramics and Print (1994) and Painted Clay: Graphic Arts and the Ceramic Surface (2001). He served as Professor of Ceramics at the Oslo National Academy of the Arts from 2011 to 2018. He lives and works in Cumbria in North West, England.

== Early life and education ==
Paul Scott was born in 1953. He studied at S. Martins College in Lancaster where he was awarded a Bachelor of Education in 1977. He taught for 8 years before leaving to become a freelance artist and writer. In 2010, Scott was awarded a PhD at the Manchester Metropolitan University; for his practice-based thesis ‘Ceramics and Landscape, Remediation and Confection, A Theory of Surface’.

== Career ==
=== Artwork ===
Scott is known for updating historic ceramic techniques and aesthetics through his contemporary transferware; along with transfer print decoration, the artist has worked with Japanese kintsugi repair, and the Chinese-inspired willow pattern which was developed by English potteries in the 18th century. Artist and writer Amy Gogarty explained that “for much of his professional life, Scott’s work has been recognized as political… he engaged issues of apartheid, the environment and social justice.” Describing the effect of combining supposedly historic dinnerware with such political subject matter, artist and journalist Andy Christian noted that “there is something beguilingly disarming about the traditional blue and white ware with which he works; something that wrong-foots us.”

Scott has researched historical transferware archives in Britain, Scandinavia, Europe, and the United States, including at Copeland/Spode, Egersund, Gustavsberg, Rörstrand, and V&A Wedgwood. From 2016 to 2019, Scott received a grant from the Alturas Foundation to pursue a project engaging the "American Scenery" theme, which was “a once popular subcategory of designs for British Manufacturers,” explained Shax Riegler for The Magazine Antiques. Reviewing examples from the series in 2019 for Arteidolia, Lyn Horton stated that Scott took “the beautiful elements of nineteenth-century English Staffordshire blue and white transferware… and plugged in his own exemplary pictures.” Among the scenes were abandoned factories, nuclear plants, chemically polluted landscapes, “portraits of disenfranchised people,” and the US-Mexico border wall.

Discussing another example of the artist’s work, this time for The New York Times reporter William Grimes stated that Scott “has updated English transferware, with its romantic evocations of American scenes in the rudest way.” Highlighting the artwork “Turnpike No. 3” which depicted a toll plaza on the New Jersey Turnpike, he described it ironically as “one of a series devoted to such heartwarming sights as the Indian Point nuclear plant and a fracking derrick.”

=== Writing ===
In 1994, Scott published Ceramics and Print, which subsequently appeared in three editions. Writing for Studio Potter in 2010, artist Holly Hanessian associated Scott’s writing with a wider revival of print technologies in contemporary ceramic practice and education. Mentioning artist Paul Wandless’s Image Transfer on Clay along with Scott’s Ceramics and Print, Hanessian stated that “since the publications of these books, new technologies are redefining the ceramic industry and are making their way into university curricula, especially in the United Kingdom.”

In 2001, Scott published the Painted Clay: Graphic Arts and the Ceramic Surface in Great Britain and the United States. Writing for Ceramic Review, artist Felicity Aylieff described the publication as “a celebration of the narrative power of ceramics.” Kevin Petrie, reviewing it for Printmaking Today called the publication “an excellent overview of a huge subject” and “a useful and timely contribution to the literature.”

== Public collections ==
Scott’s artwork is held in public collections, including the Boston Museum of Fine Arts; Carnegie Museum of Art; Los Angeles County Museum of Art; Musée Ariana; Nationalmuseum (Sweden); National Museum of Art Architecture and Design (Norway); National Museums Scotland; New York Historical Society; Philadelphia Art Museum; Smithsonian American Art Museum; Victoria and Albert Museum.
