= Paul Scott (poet) =

English poet

Paul Scott is an English poet and activist. He is deaf and uses British Sign Language (BSL).

== Activity ==
Paul was born to a deaf family and grew up using sign language. He started experimenting with poetry when he was 15 years old, under the influence of Dorothy Miles, a pioneer in sign language poetry.

Paul Scott is a renowned poet within the deaf community. His poetry explores deaf identity, defies the expectations of the majority (hearing) culture and aims at its empowerment, with a rich use of images and humour. For example, in his poem "Five senses" the visual beauty and expressive potential of sign language are employed to convey pride in the signed language and deaf identity. The poem "Three Queens" was composed in 2003 to celebrate the official recognition of BSL by the British Government, and mentions Queen Elizabeth I, Queen Victoria and Queen Elizabeth II, thus making parallels between Deaf history and more recognisable historic figures and adding proudly deaf events to the national history.

His poems feature elaborated metaphors and extensively use parallel and symmetric structure, as well as a vivid performance.
