= National Glass Centre =

Glass museum in Tyne and Wear, England

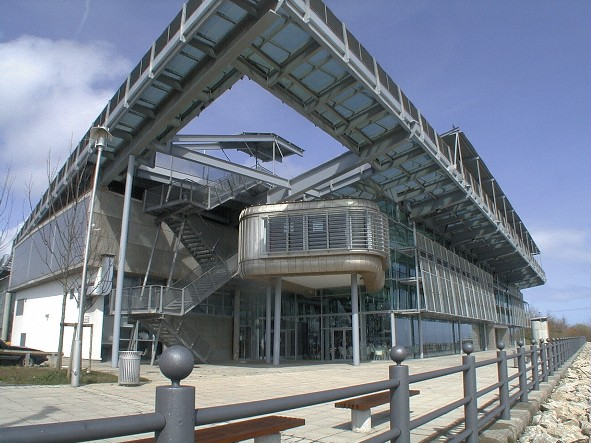
- National Glass Centre

- National Glass Centre shown within Tyne and Wear grid reference NZ395577
- Established: 1998
- Location: Sunderland, Tyne and Wear
- Coordinates: 54.913°N 1.385°W
- Type: Glass museum
- Website: www.nationalglasscentre.com

The National Glass Centre is a cultural venue and visitor attraction located in Sunderland, North East England. It is part of the University of Sunderland. It has been closed since 31 July 2026, and there are plans to demolish it.

== Background ==
The National Glass Centre is located in Sunderland, on the north banks of the River Wear, on the former site of J.L. Thompson and Sons shipyard. The centre is close to St Peter's Church, Monkwearmouth, part of the original Monkwearmouth-Jarrow Priory built in 674. It was here that Benedict Biscop introduced glass making into Britain, by hiring French glaziers to make the windows for the priory. The glass-making industry expanded rapidly in the eighteenth century, driven by an abundance of cheap coal and high-quality imported sand. Sunderland glass became known throughout the country. In later years, the Pyrex brand of glassware was manufactured in Sunderland. In 2007, the last two remaining glass firms in Sunderland - Corning Glass Works and Arc International (who make Pyrex) - announced they would close.

Despite the decline in the industry, the centre was opened for £17 million in 1998. It was funded by the Arts Council in conjunction with the University of Sunderland, Tyne and Wear Development Corporation, European Regional Development Fund and Sunderland City Council. The centre, located alongside the university's St Peter's campus, continued the regeneration of the banks of the Wear.

== Experience ==
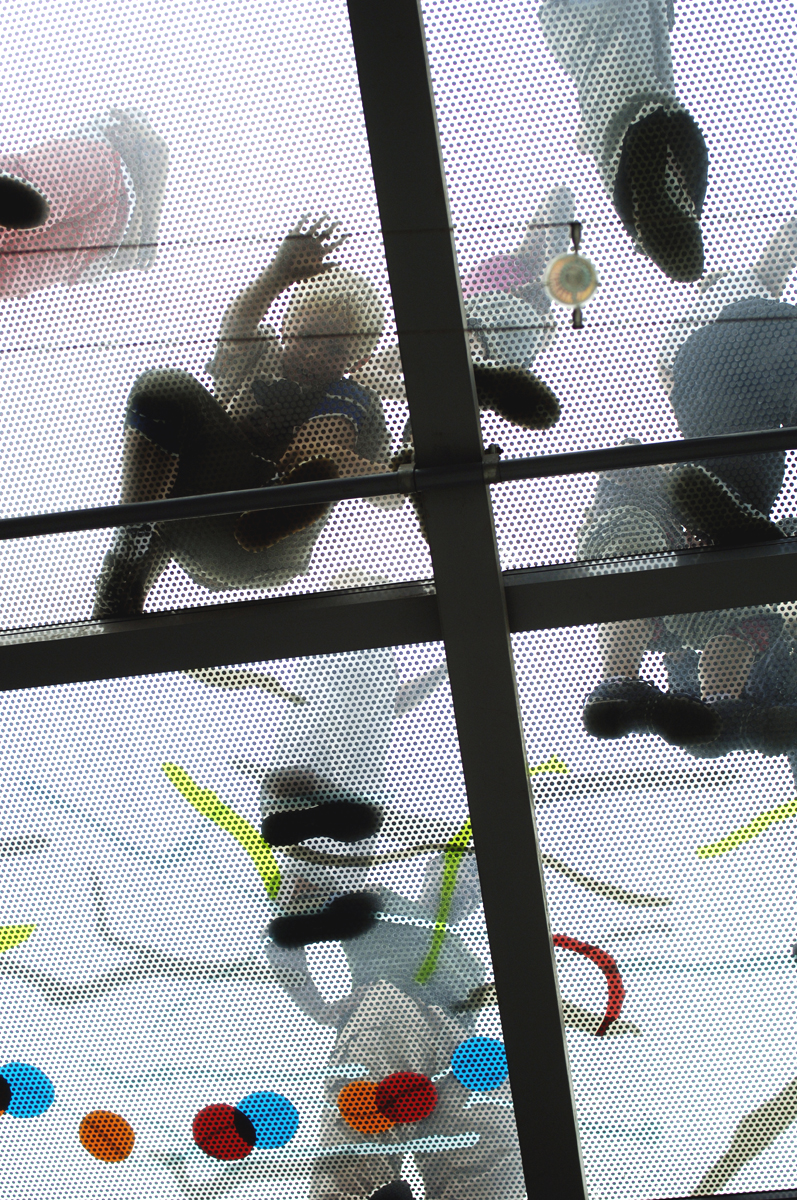
The National Glass Centre roof from below

The National Glass Centre is constructed from glass and steel. Visitors could walk on its glass roof and look down into the centre below. However, the roof was closed to visitors in 2018 as it needed repairs. While the closure was meant to be temporary, it was never reopened. There is a total of 3,250 square metres of glass on the roof, and it could hold 460 people at any one time. Each glass panel on the roof is 6 cm thick.

The centre contained a museum dedicated to the history of glass-making, and several galleries with changing exhibitions. Hot glass demonstrations provided a context for the museum's collection. The Centre also housed the University of Sunderland's Glass and Ceramics Department and Institute for International Research in Glass. A number of artists were located on site, and their work could be purchased by visitors in the glass shop.

In August 2006, National Glass Centre dropped its admission fee and became free to visit. After the removal of an admission fee, the centre saw a rapid increase in visitors. It also played host to many prestigious events including the 2007 North East Tourism Awards and T4 Transmission with T-Mobile. However, it experienced financial difficulties resulting in a risk of closure in 2013. It was taken over by the university, but continued to lose money due to high costs, leading to its closure in 2026.

== Closure ==
National Glass Centre closed on 31 July 2026 due to maintenance and repair costs; the University of Sunderland stated that necessary repairs to the site would cost between £14 million and £45 million, and they were unable to afford this without financial support. Campaigners from Save the National Glass Centre dispute these figures.

In May 2026, an application was submitted to Historic England to make the building listed, though a certificate of immunity from listing was being submitted by the University of Sunderland. In July 2026, Sunderland City Council was looking into measures to prevent the building's demolition. The building was added to Save Britain's Heritage Buildings at Risk register in July 2026. In October 2026, the Department for Digital, Culture, Media and Sport rejected the proposal for listing, after advice from Historic England, who supported the certificate of immunity from listing.

A planning application has been submitted to transform a former warehouse into Glassworks: Sunderland, a new home for glassmaking in the city. Glassworks: Sunderland is not a replacement for National Glass Centre. It will provide specialist facilities, workspaces, learning opportunities and business support for glassmakers and creative enterprises. The facility is proposed to open in 2028.

== Exhibitions ==
The National Glass Centre hosted a variety of changing exhibitions in its Contemporary Gallery. Exhibitions have included:

- Connection to Place - Tim Shaw — June – August 2010
- Beautifully Crafted — 25 September 2008 – 22 February 2009
- The Dark Glass — 6–28 September 2008
- Art Forms from the Ocean — 11 April – 31 August 2008
- Neon — 1 December 2007 – 24 March 2008
- One-off Factory, featuring Mathias Bengtsson and Anne Vibeke Mou — 6 October – 18 November 2007
- North + South — 1 July – 23 September 2007
- Lynette Wallworth — 17 March – 17 June 2007
- Snowdomes — 25 November 2006 – 4 March 2007
- Lybensky & Brychtova (What then Shall we Choose? Weight or Lightness?) — 17 July – 12 November 2006
- Wearing Glass — 12 May – 9 July 2006
- Trip the Light Fantastic — 10 February – 30 April 2006
- Confluence — 25 March – 10 September 2023
- The Liminal Guard - Theo Harper — 25 March – 14 October 2023
- Bernard Lloyd Collection — 16 September 2023 – 10 March 2024
- Hassina Khan — 16 September 2023 – 10 March 2024

== See also ==
- Contemporary Glass Society
