= Richard Slee (artist) =

Richard Slee (born Carlisle, 1946) is a British ceramic artist.

He studied at Carlisle College of Art and Design (1964–65), the Central School of Art and Design (1965–70), from which he graduated with a first-class honours degree in ceramics, and the Royal College of Art (1986–88).

Slee has been professor of ceramics at Camberwell College of Arts, London, since 1992 and was awarded the Jerwood Prize for Ceramics in 2002. He had a retrospective exhibition at the Crafts Council in 2004 and an exhibition at the Victoria and Albert Museum from June 2010 to April 2011.
