= Paul B Scott =

Jamaican businessman

Paul B. Scott
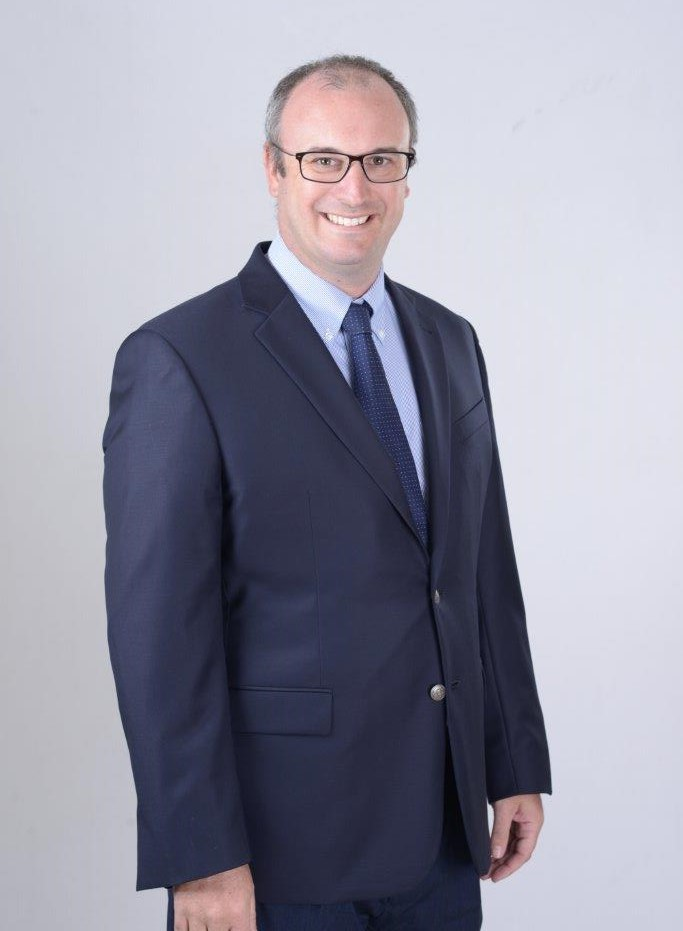
- Born: Paul Barnaby Scott; 22 November 1975 (age 49); Hexham, Northumberland, United Kingdom
- Occupation: Chairman CEO of Musson Group of Companies
- Spouse: Jennifer Scott
- Children: 2

Paul Barnaby "PB" Scott (born November 22, 1975) is chairman, CEO, and majority shareholder of the Musson Group of Companies, which has controlling stakes in public and private companies operating in more than 30 countries throughout the Caribbean, Central American region, and the Pacific.

== Career ==
Scott joined the Musson Group of Companies in 1994, and progressed to the role of CEO in 2004, succeeding Desmond Blades. He was later named Chairman of the board in 2009.

Scott also is Chairman of Eppley; an alternative investment company in the Caribbean. Eppley Caribbean Property Fund is the largest listed real estate mutual fund in the Caribbean.

== Public service ==
Scott has served as part of several boards, organizations, and commissions in Jamaica. He is the current Chairman of the Development Bank of Jamaica (DBJ) and the Treasurer of the American International School of Kingston (AISK). He is currently a founding director and deputy chairman of the Caribbean Private Sector Organisation (CPSO).

He is also a past president of the Private Sector Organisation of Jamaica (PSOJ) and a former Honorary Consul General for the Republic of Guatemala in Jamaica.

In 2017, Scott was awarded the Jamaican national honor of the Order of Distinction (Commander Rank) for his contribution to business development in Jamaica and the Caribbean. In August 2023, Scott’s contribution to Jamaica’s economic development was further recognised by the government with the award of one of the county’s highest national honours, the Order of Jamaica (OJ).
