= Jeanette Henderson =

Author, academic, radio broadcaster

Dr. Jeanette Henderson (1953–2019) was an author, academic, radio broadcaster, policy maker, social worker and Tribunal Specialist Lay Judge in the field of mental health.

== Early life ==
Jeanette Henderson grew up in County Durham.

== Education ==
In 1993, she completed a Diploma in Social Work (DipSW) at the University of Sunderland. In 1994, she received a first class BA degree from the Open University. While a student at the University of Sunderland, Jeanette Henderson wrote and published an article in a peer-reviewed journal.

== Career in social work and higher education ==
She qualified as an Approved Social Worker under the UK's Mental Health Act, serving in this role with Durham County Council from 1995 to 1999. In 1999, after several years training social workers and working as an Associate Lecturer for the Open University, she joined the Open University where she remained until 2007. At the Open University, she chaired the development and production of a new course, K272 Challenging Ideas in Mental Health, and contributed to the development of K225 Diverse Perspectives on Mental Health, and K303 Managing Care. In 2004 she gained her doctorate at the Open University: her PhD thesis was entitled “Constructions, meanings and experiences of ‘care’ in mental health”. She co-edited two books and authored fifteen journal articles and book chapters on the management and practice of mental health care, with a particular focus on the connections between mental health and family relationships. Both the books achieved a very broad international reach, as have a significant number of the articles. Her expertise in the field of mental health was formally recognised in her appointment by the Lord Chancellor's Office as a Specialist Lay Judge for the Mental Health Review Tribunal (Northern Region) where she served from 2003 to 2010.

== Social and public engagement ==
Jeanette Henderson also made a significant contribution to the wider public understanding of mental health issues both in the UK and overseas. In 2001 and 2002, she presented two series of programmes “Health in Mind” on the BBC World Service based in India and the UK, exploring mental health issues around the world in their glocal societal contexts. Her understanding of mental health as a global issue also found expression in more direct and practical activities. For instance, in 2008 she spent five months working in Bhutan with the Ministry of Health, advising on the development of its first mental health policies and assisting in the publication of the country's mental health service framework.

== Personal ==
Jeanette Henderson was married to David Sadler (academic geographer and senior university leader, 1960) and had a son from an earlier marriage, David Mlynski (1976), an industrial and product designer.
